= Tahamí terrane =

- Stratigraphic range: Permo-Triassic (emplaced); ~280–230 Ma
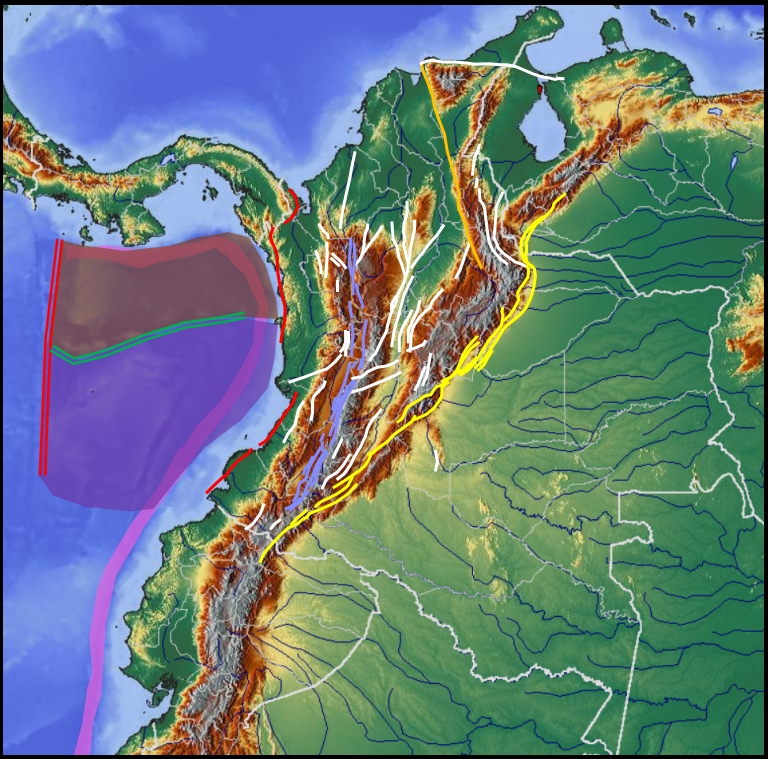
- Tahamí terrane is enclosed by the Bucaramanga-Santa Marta Fault (orange), northernmost Oca Fault (white) and Romeral Fault System (violet)
- Type: Terrane
- Unit of: North Andes plate
- Sub-units: Subunits
- Underlies: Arquía, Caribbean, La Guajira & Quebradagrande terranes
- Overlies: Chibcha terrane

Lithology
- Primary: Complexes, basins
- Other: Volcanoes

Location
- Location: Antioquia, Bolívar, Caldas, Cauca, La Guajira, Magdalena, Nariño, Risaralda, Sucre, Valle del Cauca departments
- Coordinates: 7°08′00″N 75°13′45″W
- Region: Andean, Caribbean
- Country: Colombia
- Extent: Central, Macuira, SNSM

Type section
- Named for: Tahamí, Nutabe
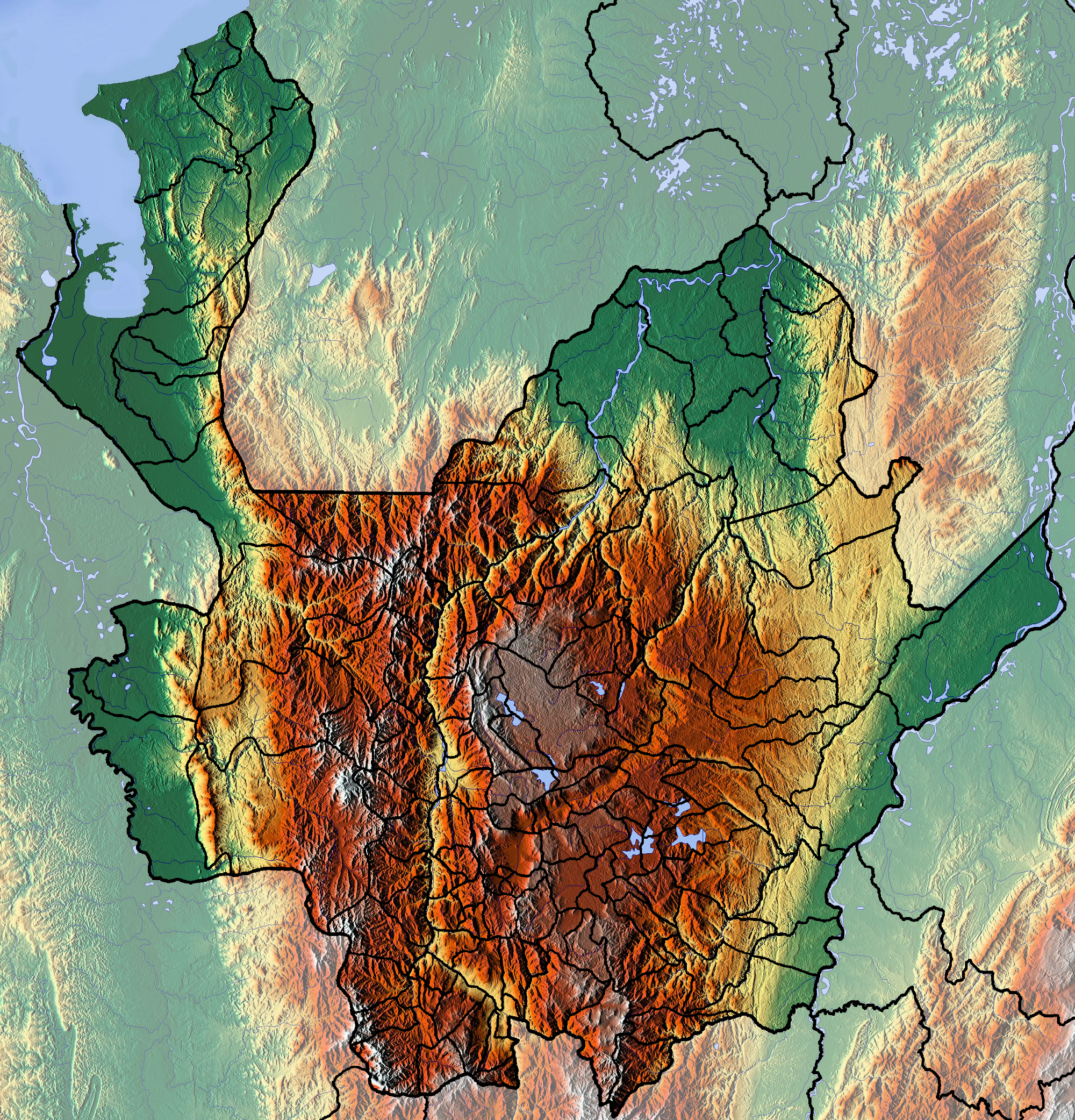
- Tahamí terrane (Colombia) Tahamí terrane (Antioquia Department)

The Tahamí (Spanish: Terreno Tahamí, TT) or Tahamí–Panzenú terrane is one of the geological provinces (terranes) of Colombia. The terrane, dating to the Permo-Triassic, is situated on the North Andes plate. The contact with the Chibcha, Arquía and Quebradagrande terranes is formed by the megaregional Romeral fault system. A tiny terrane is located at the contact with the Quebradagrande terrane; Anacona terrane.

The terrane is offset along the regional Bucaramanga-Santa Marta Fault from the Caribbean, La Guajira and Chibcha terranes, and by the regional Oca Fault with the Chibcha terrane.

== Etymology ==
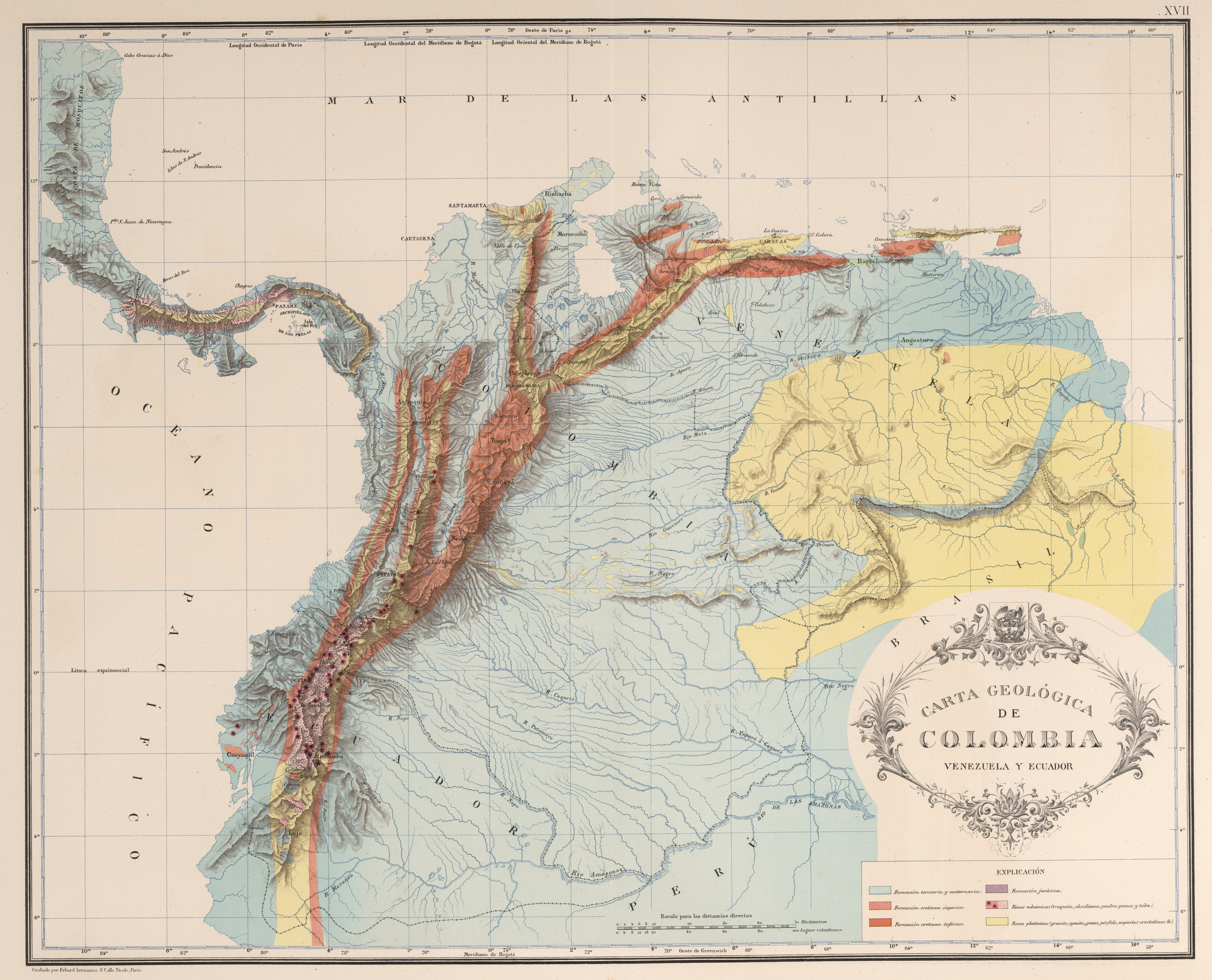
Geologic map of Colombia, Venezuela and Ecuador (Codazzi, 1890)

The terrane is, as the Chibcha terrane, named after an Indigenous people from Antioquia; the Chibcha-speaking Tahamí, part of the greater Nutabe group. Panzenú refers to the Zenú civilization, that thrived from about 200 BCE to 1600 CE in the Sinú river basin.

== Reinterpretation ==
A study performed by Mora Bohórquez et al. in 2017 showed no basement variation between the Chibcha terrane San Lucas basement underlying the Lower Magdalena Valley (VIM) and the SNSM basement to the east of the Santa Marta Fault. The authors redefined the contacts between the different terranes, using the names Calima terrane for the coastal portion of the Caribbean terrane (San Jacinto and Sinú foldbelts) and Tahamí–Panzenú terrane for the Tahamí terrane.

== Subdivision ==
=== Complexes ===
- Antioquia Batholith
  - Romeral
  - Hispania
  - Pueblito
  - Montegrande
  - Palmitas
  - Ayura Montebello
  - Medellín dunite
  - Ceja
  - Medellín amphibolite
  - San Isidro
- Cambumbia
- Úrsula
- Amagá
- La Honda
- Alto de Minas
- Norosí
- Jonjoncito

=== Volcanoes ===
- Nevado del Ruiz
- Nevado del Tolima
- Doña Juana
- Galeras

=== Ranges ===
- Central
- Macuira
- SNSM

=== Basins ===
- Amagá
- Cocinetas
- Lower Magdalena (VIM)

=== Faults ===
bounding faults in bold

- **Bucaramanga–Santa Marta (BSF)**
- **Romeral (RFS)**
  - Armenia
  - Buesaco-Aranda
  - Córdoba-Navarco
  - Montenegro
  - Paraíso
  - Piendamó
  - Rosas-Julumito
- **Bagre Norte**
- **Cimitarra**
- **Cucuana**
- **Mulato-Getudo**
- **Otú Norte**
- **Palestina**
- **Espiritú Santo**
- Uramita

== Gallery ==
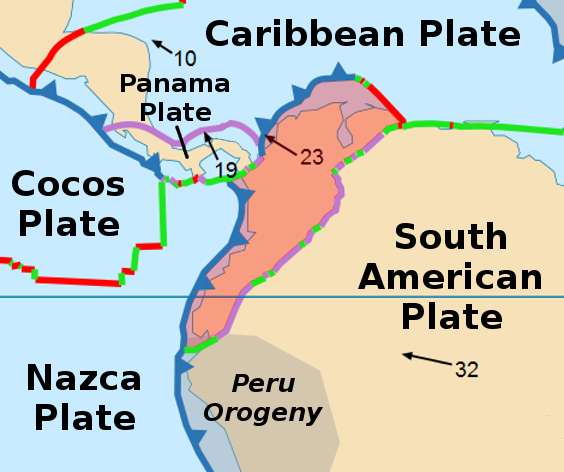
North Andes plate

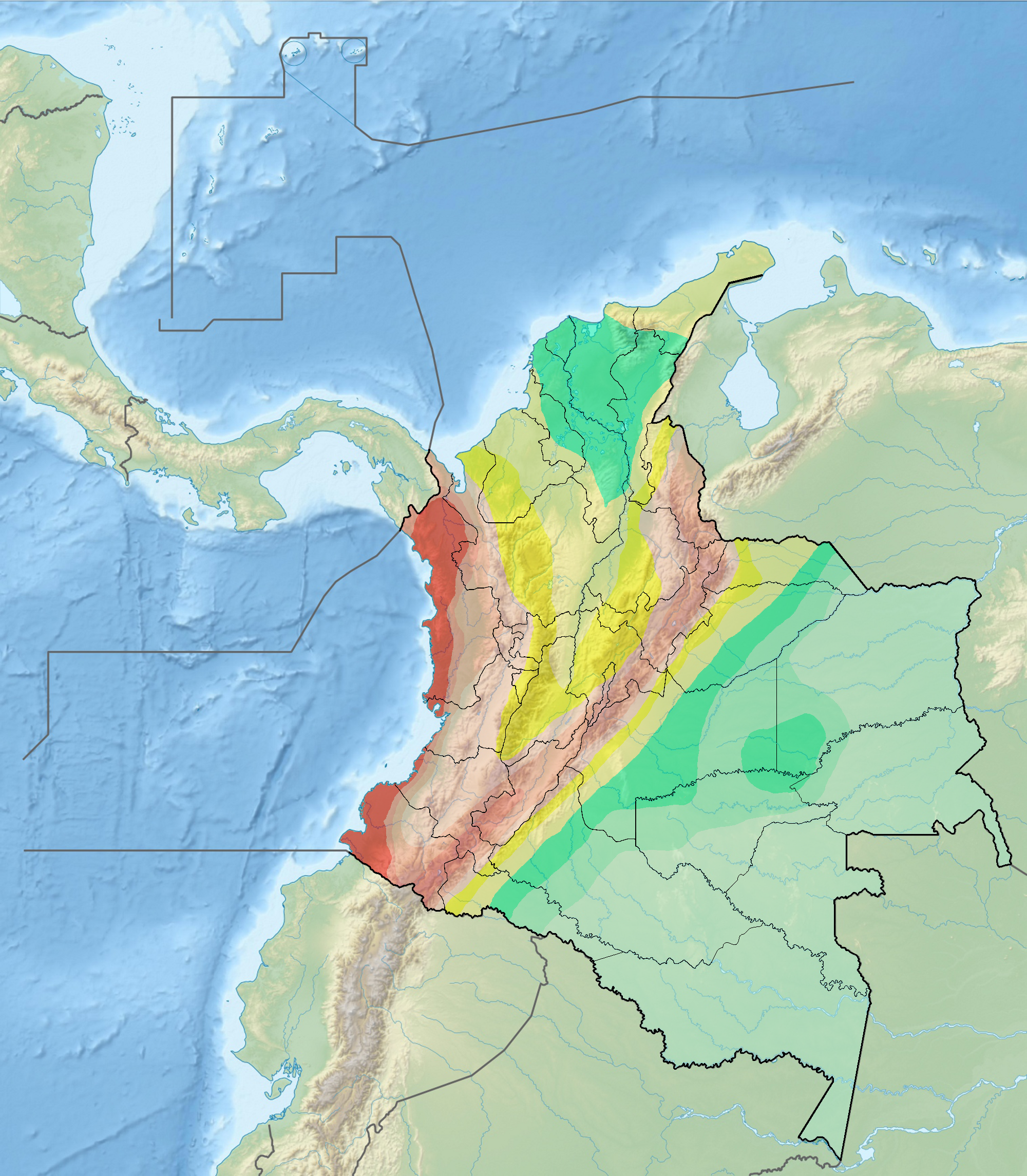
Seismic activity map

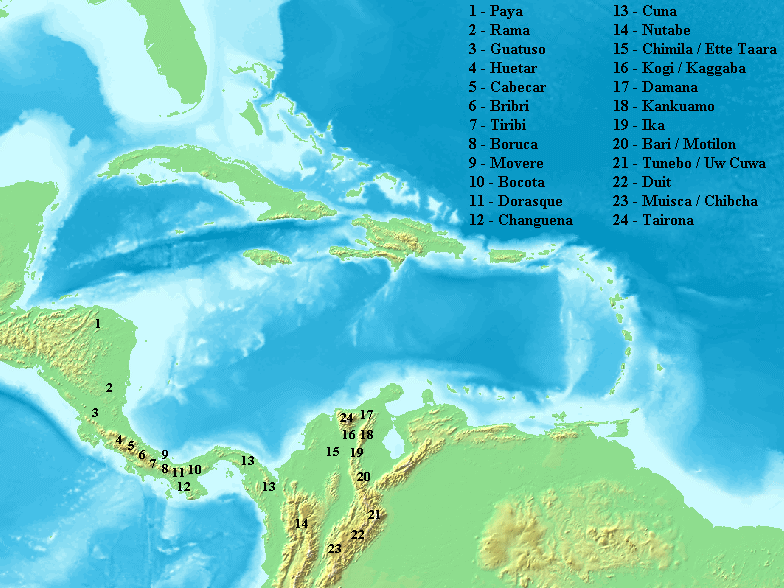
Chibcha language distribution
Tahamí are listed as Nutabes (14)

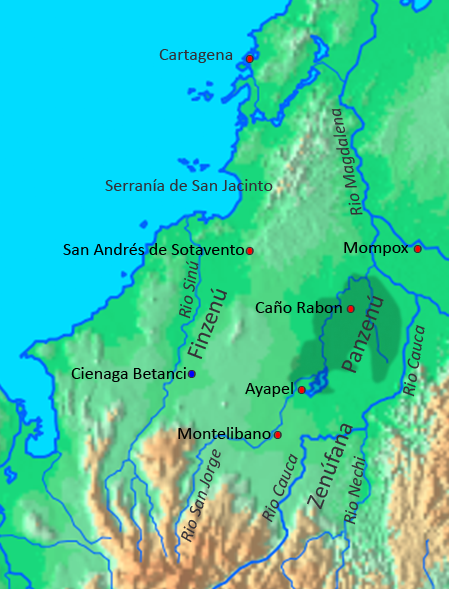
Map of Zenú civilization in NW Colombia

== See also ==
- List of earthquakes in Colombia
- List of fossiliferous stratigraphic units in Colombia
- List of mining areas in Colombia
- Geology of the Eastern Hills of Bogotá
- Cesar-Ranchería Basin
- Cocinetas Basin
- Middle Magdalena Valley (VMM)
