= Bagre Norte Fault =

Fault in northern Colombia

- Falla de Bagre Norte
- Location within Colombia
- Etymology: El Bagre
- Coordinates: 07°37′02″N 74°46′56″W
- Country: Colombia
- Region: Andean, Caribbean
- State: Antioquia, Bolívar

Characteristics
- Range: Central Ranges, Andes & Serranía de San Lucas
- Part of: Andean oblique faults
- Length: 159.3 km (99.0 mi)
- Strike: 359 ± 14
- Dip: East
- Dip angle: High
- Displacement: <0.2 mm (0.0079 in)/yr

Tectonics
- Plate: North Andean
- Status: Inactive
- Type: Oblique-slip fault strike-slip fault
- Movement: Sinistral reverse
- Age: Quaternary
- Orogeny: Andean

The Bagre Norte Fault (Spanish: Falla de Bagre Norte) is a sinistral oblique strike-slip fault in the departments of Antioquia and Bolívar in northern Colombia. The fault has a total length of 159.3 kilometres (99.0 mi) and runs along an average north to south strike of 359 ± 14 along the Central Ranges of the Colombian Andes and the Serranía de San Lucas.

== Etymology ==
The fault is named after El Bagre.

== Description ==
The Bagre Norte Fault branches from the Palestina Fault, close to the Alicante River. The fault juxtaposes Precambrian metamorphic rocks on the east against sedimentary rocks in the west. The fault shows as a prominent topographic lineament on satellite images and aerial photographs. Prominent scarp faces west, the fault appears to displace erosion surfaces of the Central Ranges about 200 metres (660 ft). The strong geomorphologic expression suggests Quaternary activity.

== See also ==
- List of earthquakes in Colombia
- Bucaramanga-Santa Marta Fault
- Romeral Fault System
- Otú Norte Fault
