= La Guajira terrane =

Geological province in Colombia

- Stratigraphic range: Late Cretaceous (emplaced); ~100–65 Ma
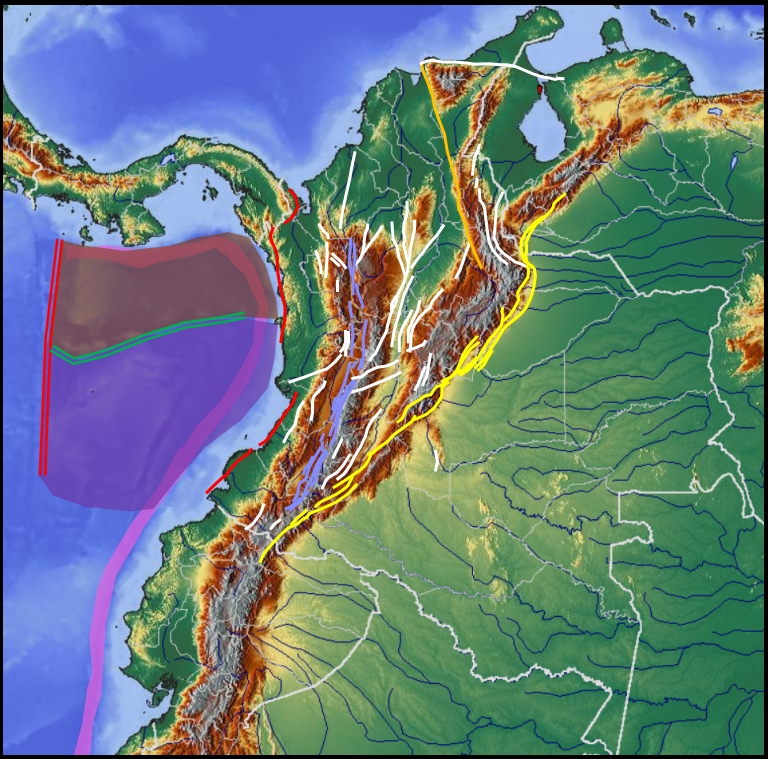
- La Guajira terrane is enclosed by the Bucaramanga–Santa Marta Fault (orange) and northernmost Oca Fault (white)
- Type: Terrane
- Unit of: North Andes plate
- Sub-units: Subunits
- Overlies: Tahamí & Chibcha terranes

Lithology
- Primary: Complexes, basins
- Other: Volcanoes

Location
- Location: La Guajira, Magdalena departments
- Coordinates: 11°28′00″N 72°44′43″W
- Region: Caribbean
- Country: Colombia
- Extent: Macuira, SNSM

Type section
- Named for: La Guajira
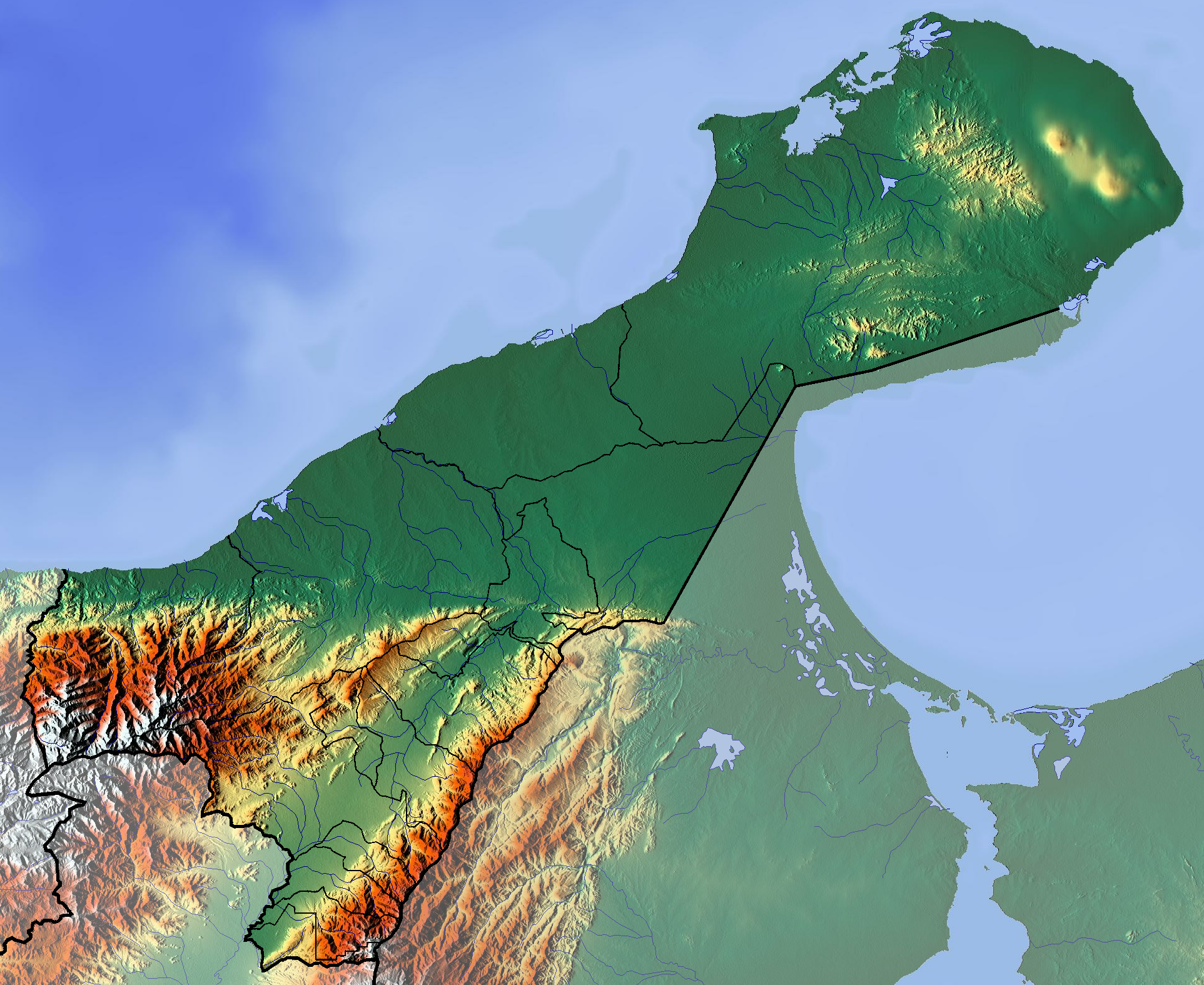
- La Guajira terrane (Colombia) La Guajira terrane (La Guajira Department)

La Guajira terrane (Spanish: Terreno de La Guajira, TLG) is one of the geological provinces (terranes) of Colombia. The terrane, dating to the late Cretaceous, is situated on the North Andes plate and borders the Caribbean, Tahamí and Chibcha terranes along the Bucaramanga–Santa Marta Fault. The southern boundary is formed by the Oca Fault with the Chibcha terrane.

== Subdivision ==
=== Complexes ===
Alto Guajira

- Macuira
- Etpana

Macuira Tahamí terrane

- Jonjoncito
- Ipapure
- Ipapure-Cerro La Teta

Sierra Nevada de Santa Marta

- Taganga (Taganga)
- Rodadero
- Gaira (Gaira)
- Ciénaga
- Santa Marta Batholith
- Bolívar Batholith
- Socorro Stock
- Latal Pluton
- Los Clavos
- Río Sevilla
- San Lorenzo
- San Pedro de la Sierra
- Buritacá
- Río Oríhueca
- Los Mangos - basement

=== Ranges ===
- Sierra Nevada de Santa Marta
- Macuira

=== Basins ===
- La Guajira

=== Faults ===
bounding faults in bold

- **Bucaramanga-Santa Marta (BSF)**
- **Oca**
- Cuisa

== Gallery ==
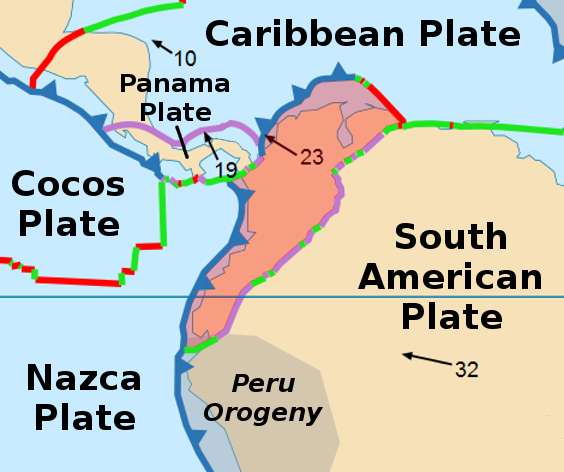
North Andes Plate

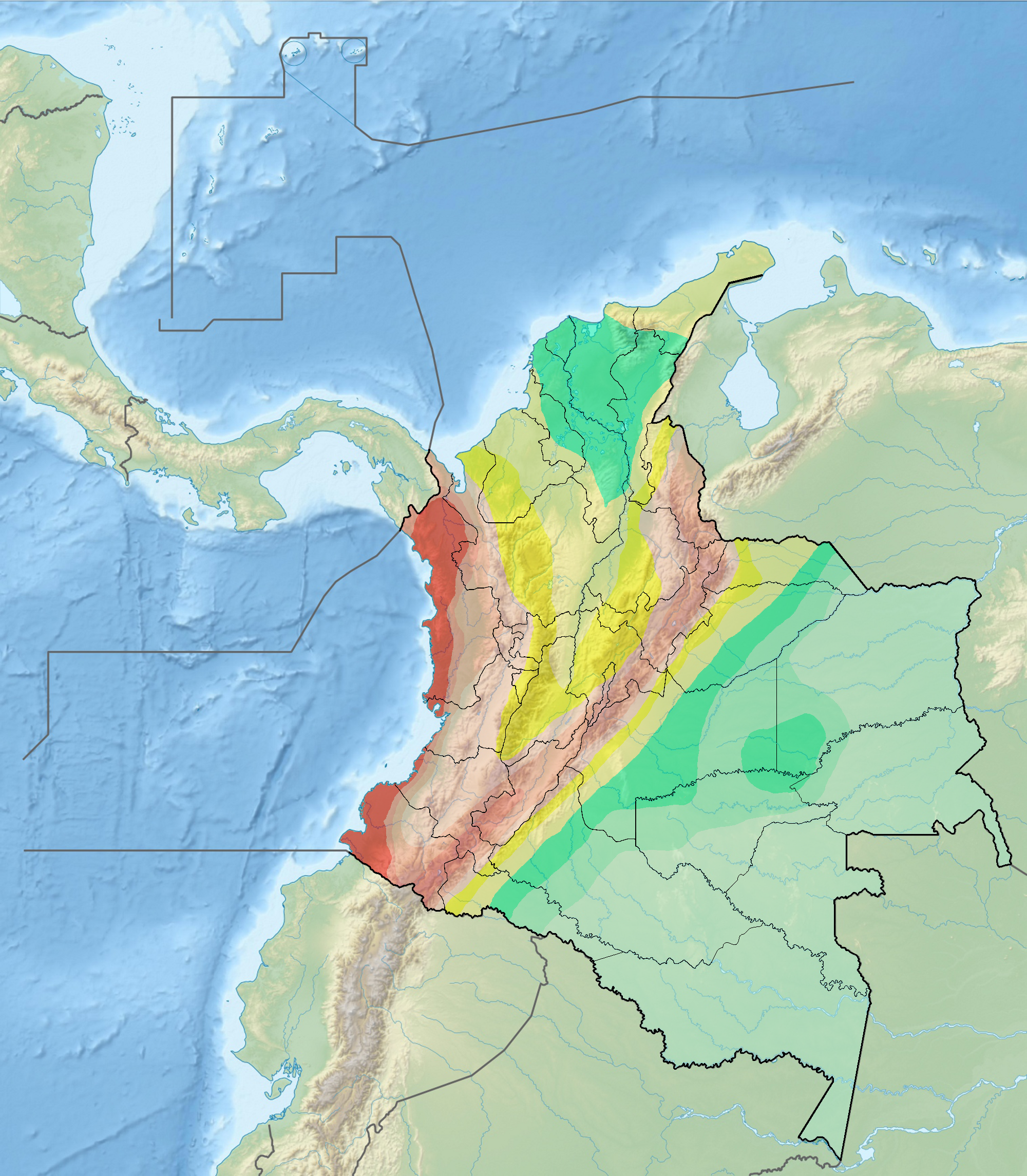
Seismic activity map

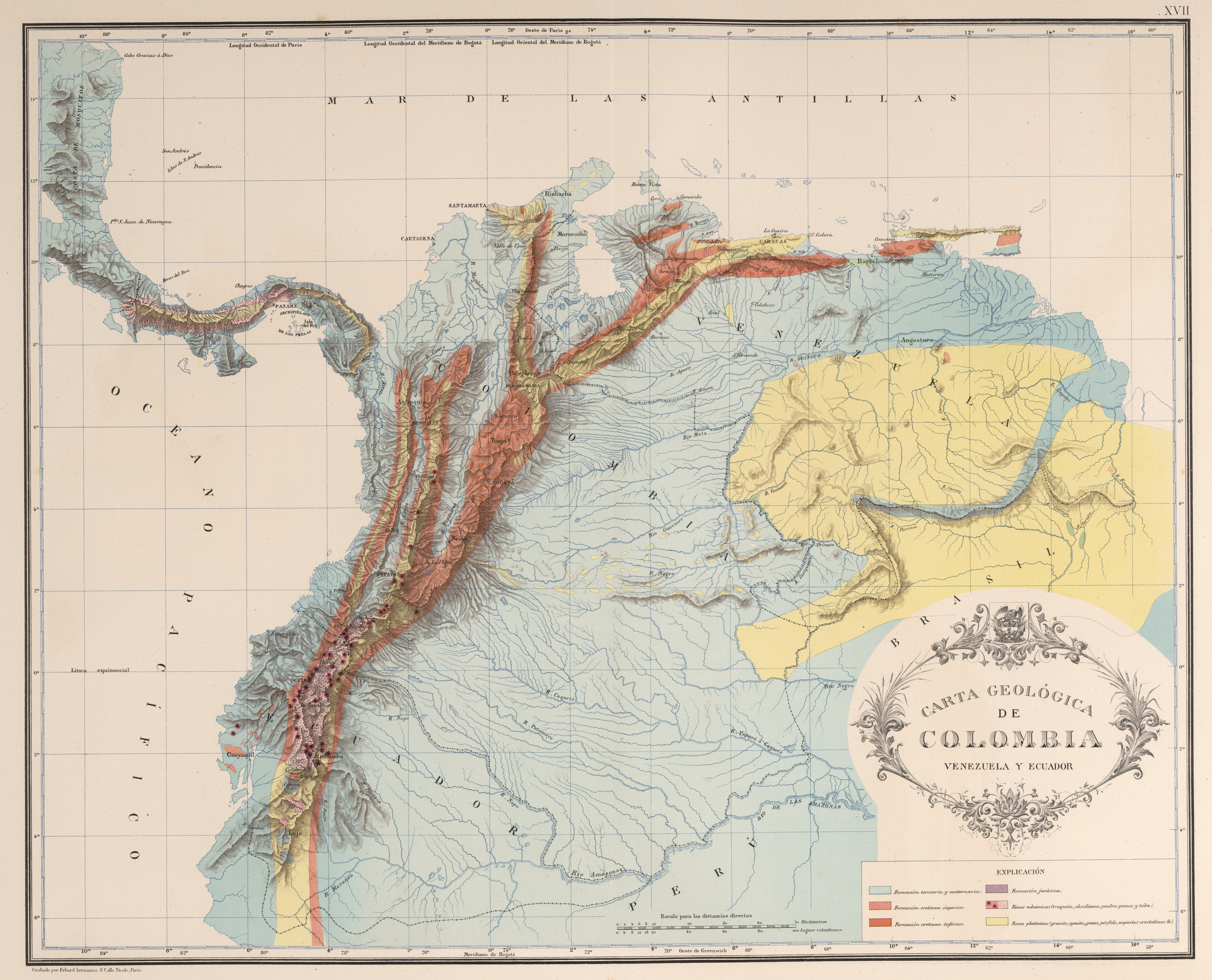
Geologic map (Codazzi, 1890)

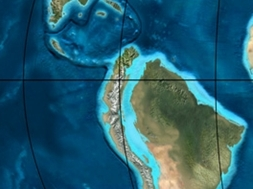
Paleogeography of the Late Cretaceous (Blakey)

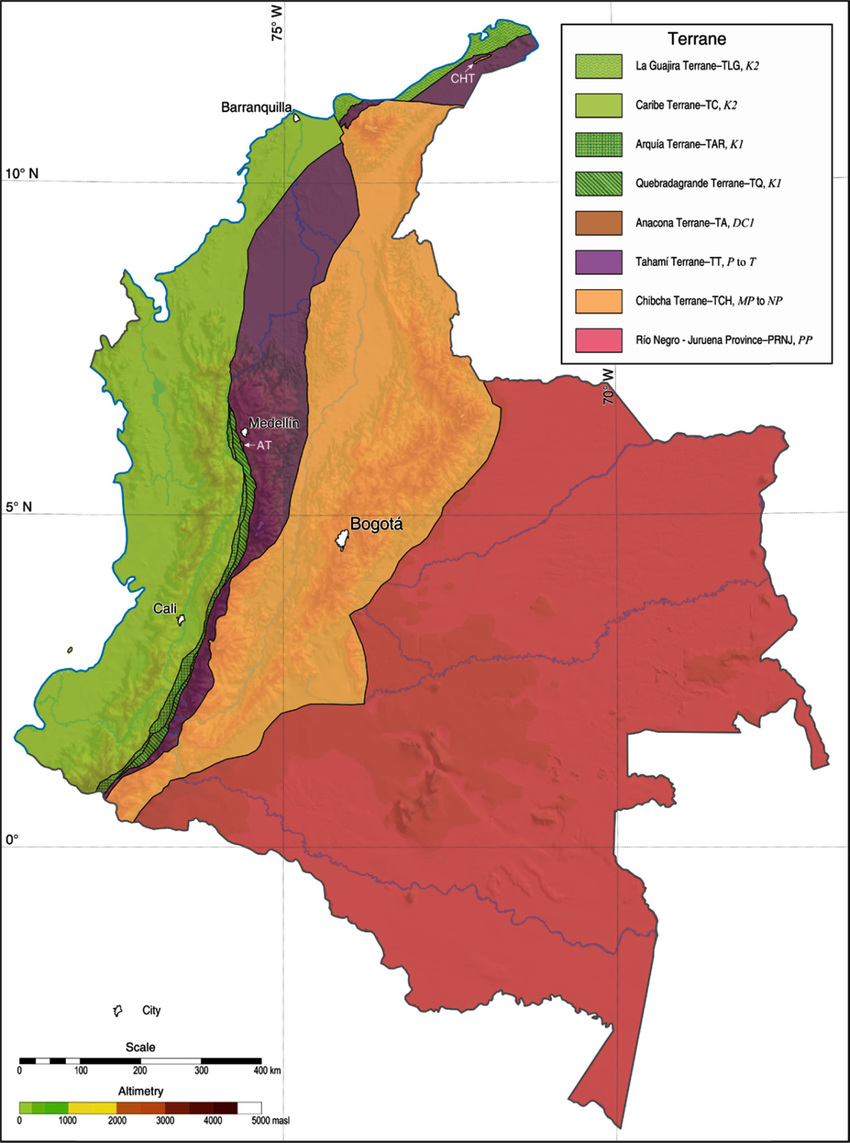
Geological terranes map of Colombia

== See also ==
- List of earthquakes in Colombia
- List of fossiliferous stratigraphic units in Colombia
- List of mining areas in Colombia
- Geology of the Eastern Hills of Bogotá
- Basin history of the Cesar-Ranchería Basin
- Basin history of the Cocinetas Basin
- Middle Magdalena Valley (VMM)
