= Bucaramanga–Santa Marta Fault =

Colombian fault system

- Bucaramanga–Santa Marta fault system (Sistema de) Falla(s) de Bucaramanga-Santa Marta
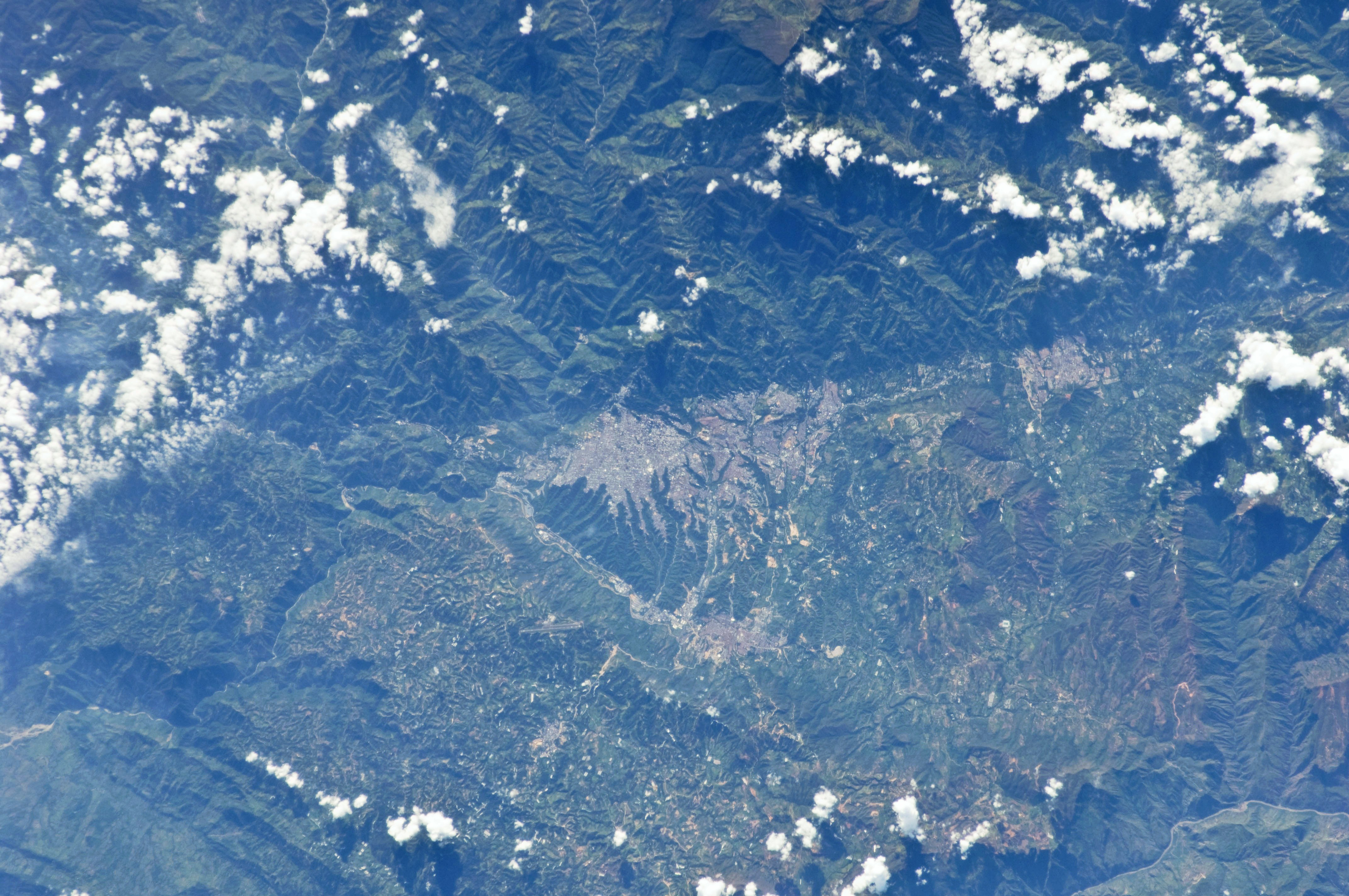
- View of the Bucaramanga Fault along Bucaramanga

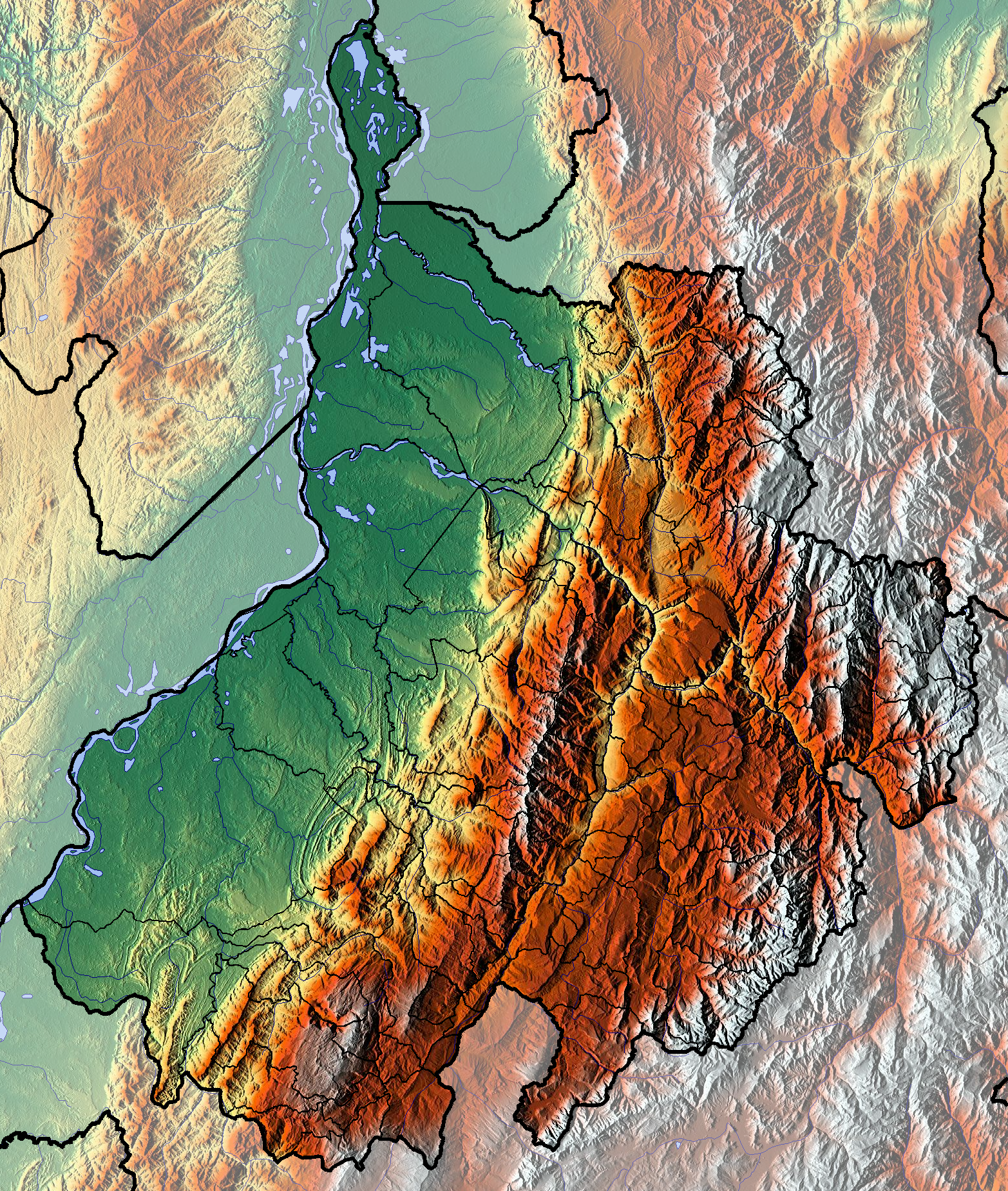
- Location of the fault in Colombia Bucaramanga–Santa Marta Fault (Santander Department)

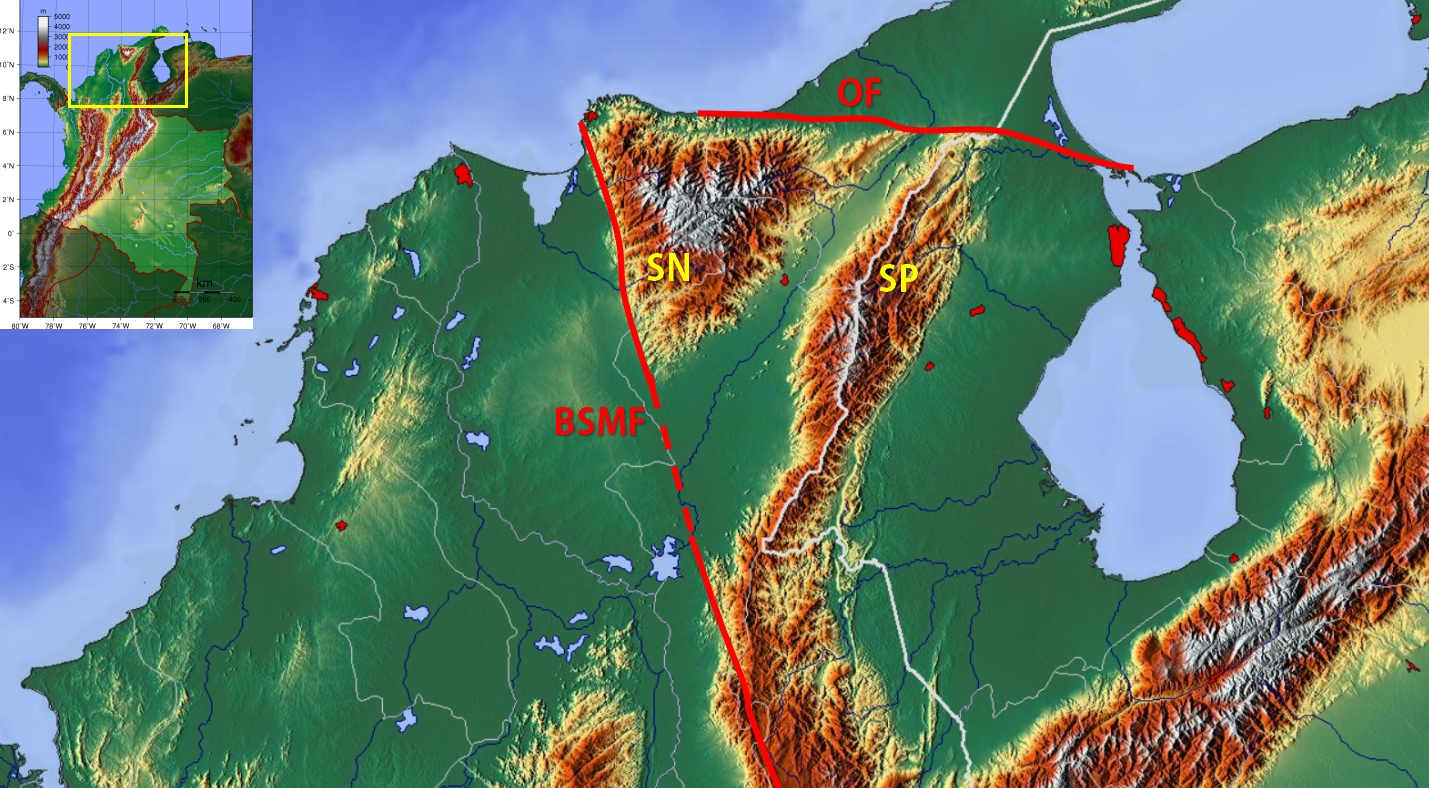
- Topographic map of northern Colombia showing the fault
- Etymology: Bucaramanga, Santa Marta
- Coordinates: 7°05′25″N 73°05′15″W
- Country: Colombia
- Region: Caribbean, Andean
- State: Magdalena, Cesar, Norte de Santander, Santander
- Cities: Santa Marta, El Paso, Bucaramanga, Floridablanca, Piedecuesta

Characteristics
- Elevation: 1–1,500 m (3.3–4,921.3 ft)
- Range: Sierra Nevada de Santa Marta; Eastern Ranges; Andes
- Part of: Andean faults
- Segments: Santa Marta, Algarrobo, Bucaramanga Faults
- Length: 674 km (419 mi)
- Strike: 341 ± 23 (NNW-SSE)
- Displacement: 110 km (68 mi)

Tectonics
- Plate: South American Plate
- Status: Active
- Earthquakes: Pre-Columbian era (~1020 AD)
- Type: Strike-slip fault
- Movement: Sinistral
- Rock units: Caribbean, La Guajira, Tahamí & Chibcha terranes
- Age: Neogene-Holocene
- Orogeny: Andean

The Bucaramanga–Santa Marta Fault (BSMF, BSF) or Bucaramanga–Santa Marta fault system (Spanish: (Sistema de) Falla(s) de Bucaramanga-Santa Marta) is a major oblique transpressional sinistral strike-slip fault (wrench fault) in the departments of Magdalena, Cesar, Norte de Santander and Santander in northern Colombia. The fault system is composed of two main outcropping segments, the Santa Marta and Bucaramanga faults, and an intermediate Algarrobo Fault segment in the subsurface. The system has a total length of 674 kilometres (419 mi) and runs along an average north-northwest to south-southeast strike of 341 ± 23 from the Caribbean coast west of Santa Marta to the northern area of the Eastern Ranges of the Colombian Andes.

The fault system is a major bounding fault for various sedimentary basins and igneous and metamorphic complexes. The northern Santa Marta Fault segment separates the Sinú-San Jacinto Basin and Lower Magdalena Valley in the west from the Sierra Nevada de Santa Marta to the east. The buried Algarrobo Fault segment forms the boundary between the Lower Magdalena Valley and northern Middle Magdalena Valley to the west and the Cesar-Ranchería Basin in the east. The Bucaramanga Fault segment separates the middle part of the Middle Magdalena Valley in the west from the Santander Massif in the east.

The fault system bounds and cuts the four largest terranes of the North Andes plate; the La Guajira, Caribbean and Tahamí terranes along the Santa Marta section and intraterrane movement in the Andean Chibcha terrane. Studies of the fault segments have shown the fault was active in the pre-Columbian era, around the year 1020, when the area around Bucaramanga was inhabited by the Guane. Various seismic events analysed to have occurred during the Holocene of the Bucaramanga Fault segment lead to the conclusion the fault is active.

== Description ==
The Bucaramanga–Santa Marta is a major fault system which extends for a total distance of 674 kilometres (419 mi) from the Colombian Caribbean coast to the Eastern Ranges of the Colombian Andes to as far as about 6.5° N, south of the capital of Santander, Bucaramanga. The fault system, with an average strike of 341 ± 23 degrees, is a major wrench fault with a sinistral (left-lateral) displacement ranging from 45 to 110 kilometres (28 to 68 mi) and a fault slip rate of 0.01 to 0.2 millimetres (0.00039 to 0.00787 in) per year. The Santa Marta Fault forms the boundary between several distinct geological provinces: it is the western limit of the Santa Marta Massif with the Sinú-San Jacinto Basin, farther to the south the fault separates the Lower Magdalena Valley and northern Middle Magdalena Valley from the Cesar-Ranchería Basin. The Santander Massif is separated from the central part of the Middle Magdalena Valley along the southern Bucaramanga Fault segment of the fault system.

The fault divides the northern part of the Eastern Ranges in two structurally distinct regions. The Andean uplifted eastern block mainly comprises crystalline igneous and metamorphic rocks of Paleozoic and pre-Cambrian age, with lesser amounts of Jurassic, Triassic, and Tertiary sedimentary rocks. In the western downthrown block, predominately sedimentary rocks of Quaternary and Tertiary age are found, with lesser amounts of Cretaceous and Jurassic rocks. The northern half of the fault is partially covered by Quaternary deposits in the Cesar and Magdalena valleys.

=== Segments ===
The fault is divided into three segments; the main Bucaramanga fault segment in the south, the Algarrobo Fault in the central section, and the main Santa Marta fault segment in the northern part of the fault system. Between the two main outcropping segments, the Algarrobo Fault is present in the subsurface, overlain by Quaternary sediments. The urban centre of the major coal producing municipality El Paso, Cesar is located right above the fault. The fault reappears at surface east of Tamalameque, Cesar, where it continues south-southeastward into the Eastern Ranges in the departments of Norte de Santander and Santander. The fault can be traced until San Andrés, Santander. The Bucaramanga Fault possibly continues as the compressional Boyacá and Soapaga Faults on the Altiplano Cundiboyacense.

=== Municipalities ===
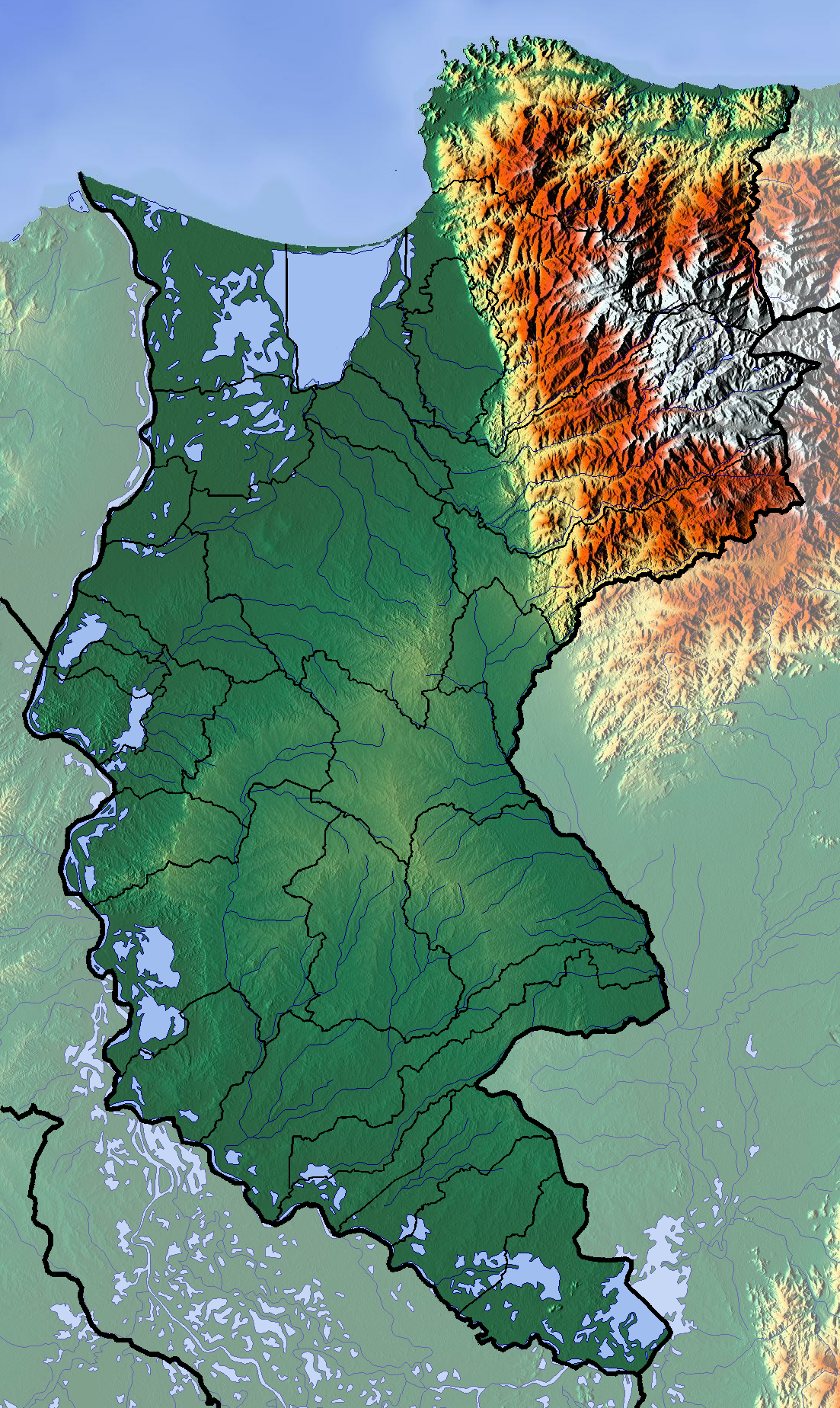
Topography of Magdalena

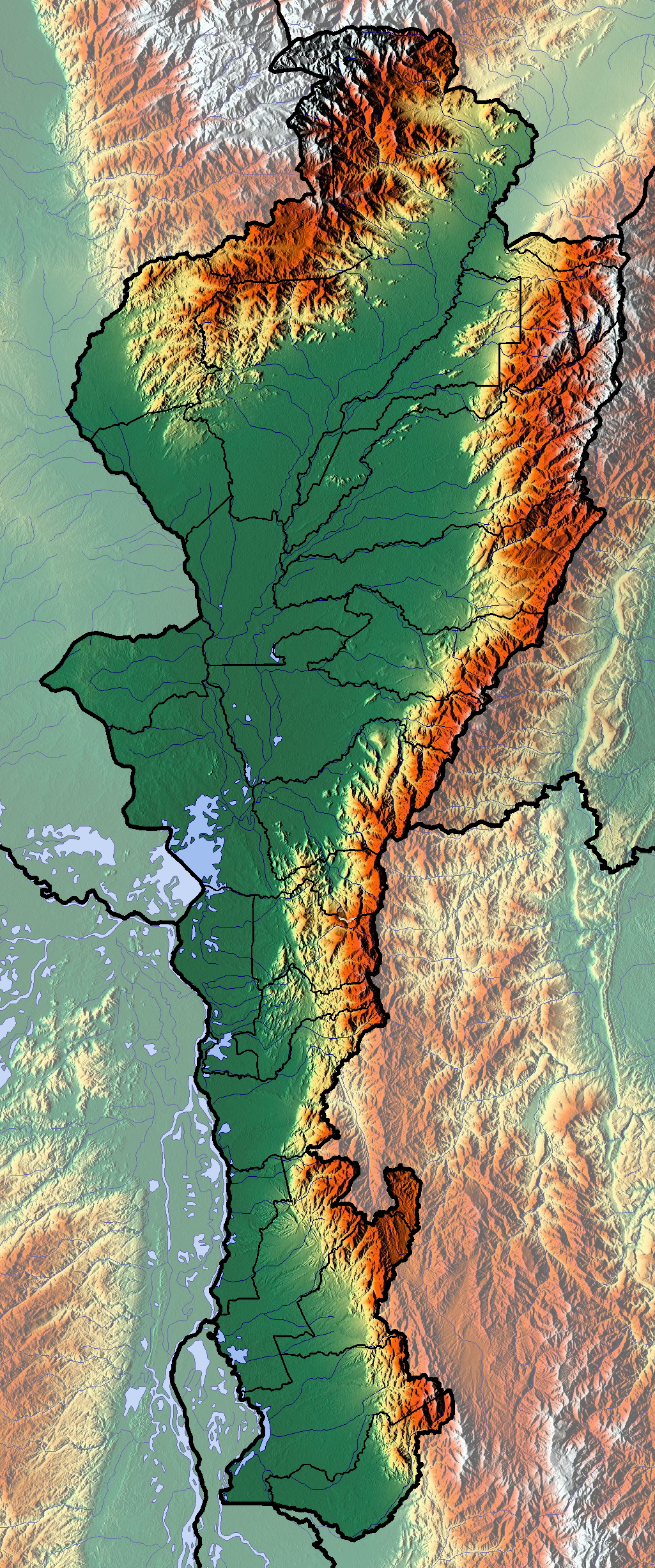
Topography of Cesar

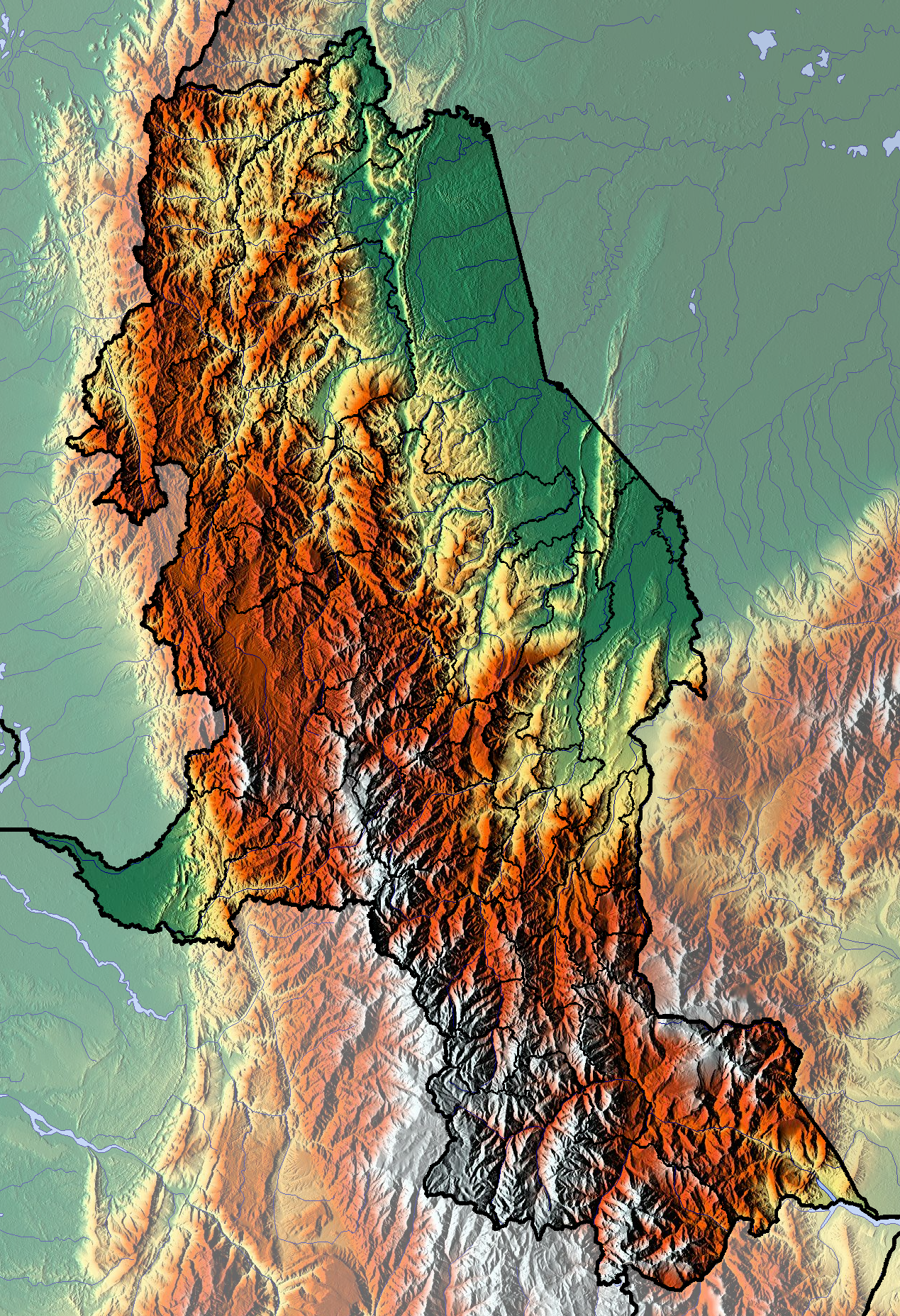
Topography of Norte de Santander

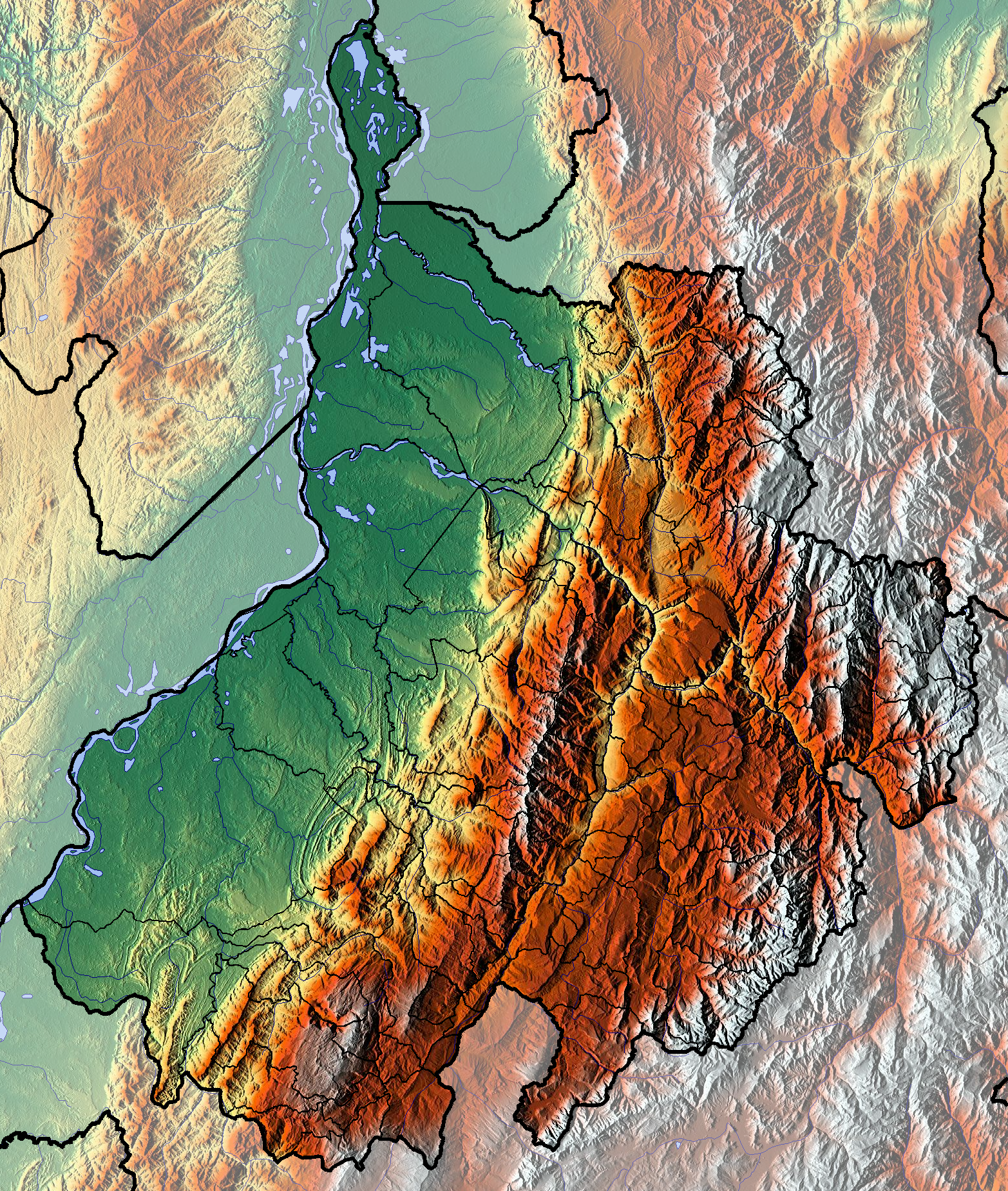
Topography of Santander

Municipality bold is capital	Department	Altitude of urban centre	Inhabitants 2015	Notes
Santa Marta	Magdalena	0 m (0 ft)	466,000	
Ciénaga	Magdalena	10 m (33 ft)	104,897	(Note: 2017 population data)
Zona Bananera	Magdalena	30 m (98 ft)	60,524	
Aracataca	Magdalena	40 m (130 ft)	39,473	
Fundación	Magdalena	10 m (33 ft)	57,344	
Algarrobo	Magdalena	24 m (79 ft)	12,576	
El Copey	Cesar	180 m (590 ft)	27,212	
Bosconia	Cesar	200 m (660 ft)	37,248	
El Paso	Cesar	36 m (118 ft)	22,832	
Chiriguaná	Cesar	40 m (130 ft)	19,650	
Curumaní	Cesar	112 m (367 ft)	24,367	
Chimichagua	Cesar	49 m (161 ft)	30,658	
Pailitas	Cesar	77 m (253 ft)	17,166	
Pelaya	Cesar	50 m (160 ft)	17,910	
La Gloria	Cesar	50 m (160 ft)	12,938	
El Carmen	Norte de Santander	761 m (2,497 ft)	14,005	
Teorama	Norte de Santander	72 m (236 ft)	21,524	
González	Cesar	1,240 m (4,070 ft)	6990	
Ocaña	Norte de Santander	1,202 m (3,944 ft)	98,992	(Note: 2016 population data)
San Martín	Cesar	119 m (390 ft)	18,548	
San Alberto	Cesar	125 m (410 ft)	24,653	
Ábrego	Norte de Santander	1,398 m (4,587 ft)	38,627	
La Esperanza	Norte de Santander	1,566 m (5,138 ft)	12,012	
Cáchira	Norte de Santander	2,025 m (6,644 ft)	10,970	
El Playón	Santander	469 m (1,539 ft)	11,776	
Rionegro	Santander	590 m (1,940 ft)	27,114	
Bucaramanga	Santander	959 m (3,146 ft)	528,575	
Floridablanca	Santander	925 m (3,035 ft)	266,669	
Piedecuesta	Santander	1,005 m (3,297 ft)	156,167	
Cepitá	Santander	660 m (2,170 ft)	1865	
San Andrés	Santander	1,777 m (5,830 ft)	8540	

== Tectonic setting ==
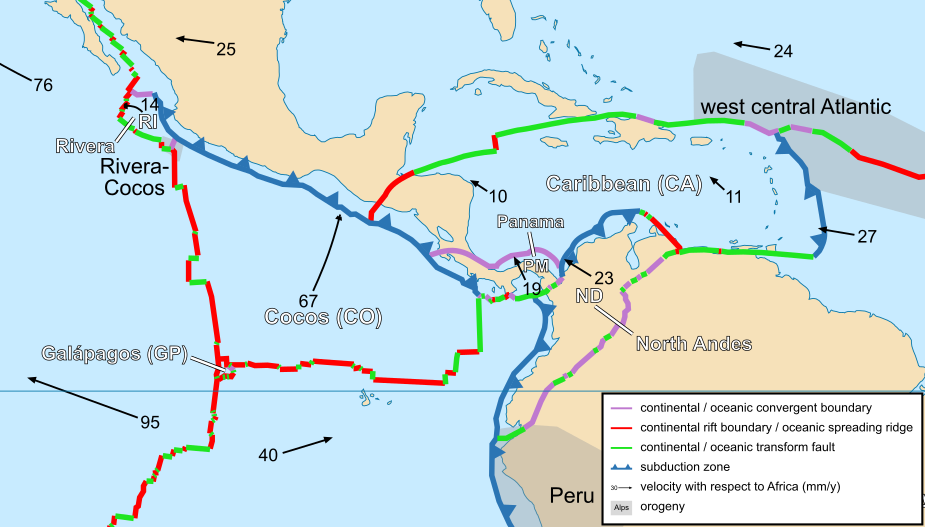
The tectonic history of the Bucaramanga-Santa Marta Fault, separating the Northern Andean from the Maracaibo Block (shown together as ND), is influenced by the interaction of the Malpelo, South American and Caribbean Plates

The Bucaramanga-Santa Marta Fault system is located in northwestern South America, on the North Andes Plate, where the 20 ± 2 millimetres (0.787 ± 0.079 in)/yr east to southeastward moving Caribbean, 60 mm (2.4 in)/yr eastward subducting Malpelo, and South American Plates converge. Since Early Mesozoic times, the western portion of Colombia was subjected to different episodes of subduction, accretion and collision, at the boundaries of the South America continental and the oceanic Farallon, Nazca, and Caribbean Plates and various island arcs. The interaction of the plate tectonic movements formed the Northern Andean Block, separated from the Maracaibo Block by the Bucaramanga-Santa Marta Fault. The Northern Andean Block is subdivided into tectonic realms, with the Bucaramanga-Santa Marta Fault separating the Central Continental Sub-plate Realm in the west from the Maracaibo Sub-plate Realm in the east. It has been suggested that these two realms are dominated by respectively Nazca and Caribbean Plate subduction. The compressional stress regime caused the formation of the oblique sinistral Bucaramanga-Santa Marta Fault and dextral Oca and Boconó Faults.

The interplay between the Santa Marta and Oca Faults produced offshore Caribbean platforms and valleys north of the Sierra Nevada de Santa Marta near Taganga. Uplift along the western margin of the Santa Marta Fault probably commenced in the Pliocene.

The Bucaramanga Fault intersects with the Boconó Fault at the Santander Massif. In this area, the top of the subducting slab has been estimated at an initial depth of approximately 100 kilometres (62 mi), then a horizontal part for about 50 kilometres (31 mi), and a farther descending section to reach a depth of around 200 kilometres (120 mi). The slab section, called Bucaramanga slab, here has a dip that continues to the oceanic crust of the Caribbean seafloor. Towards the north of the Bucaramanga Nest or Swarm, in a north–south area approximately 200 kilometres (120 mi) in length, a well-defined Wadati-Benioff Zone extending to 175 kilometres (109 mi) depth has been identified.

== Activity ==
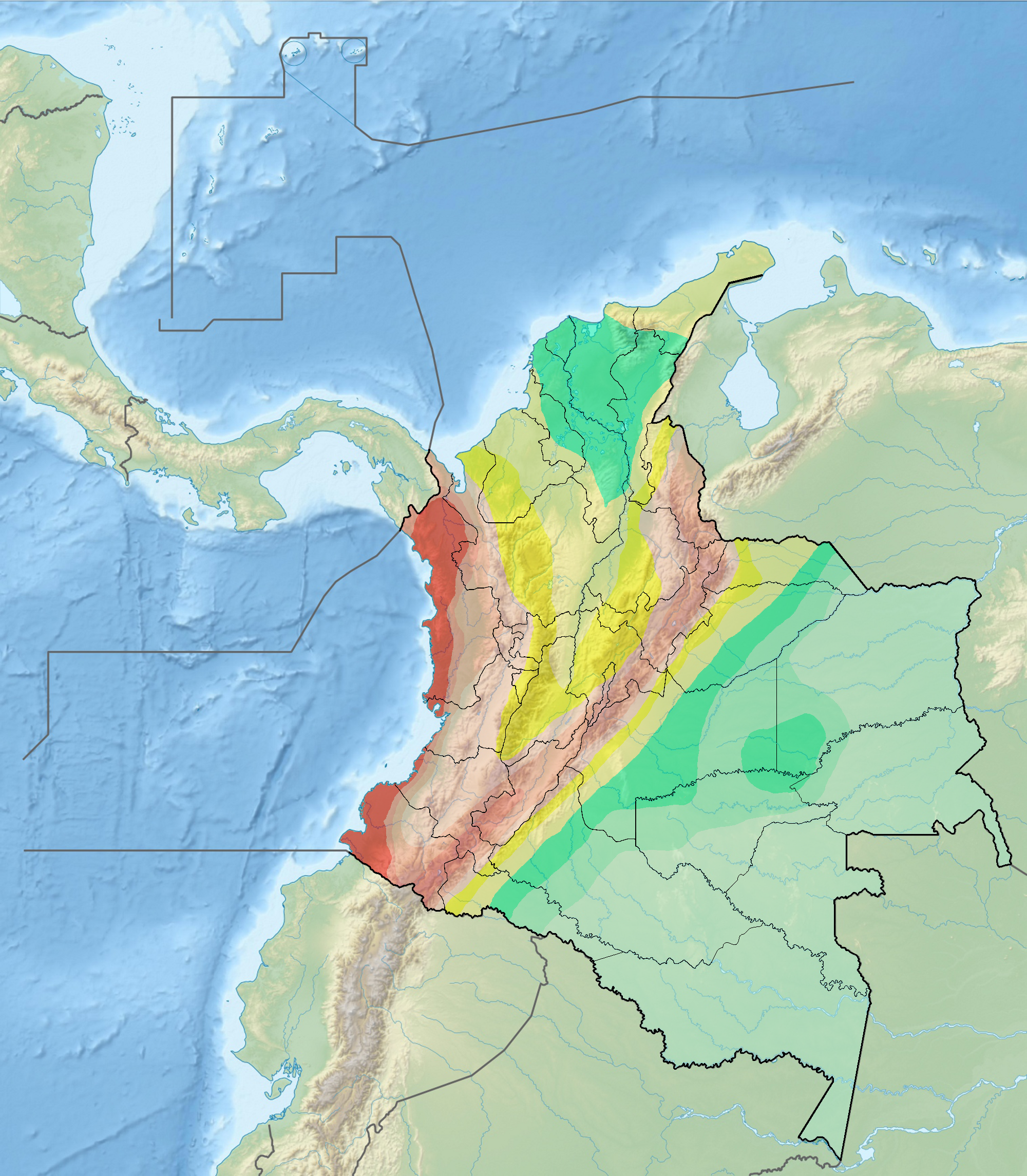
Map of seismic threats

A study published in 2009 about the Bucaramanga segment of the fault system revealed that the fault had eight episodes of activity during the late Holocene. The most recent activity has been inferred to have been around the year 1020. During this pre-Columbian era, the area around Bucaramanga was inhabited by the indigenous Guane. The authors consider the Bucaramanga Fault therefore as active.

Other faults in the seismically active zone, named Bucaramanga Nest, produced 27 earthquakes of magnitudes 4.0 to 5.3 between May 2012 and January 2013.

== Panorama ==
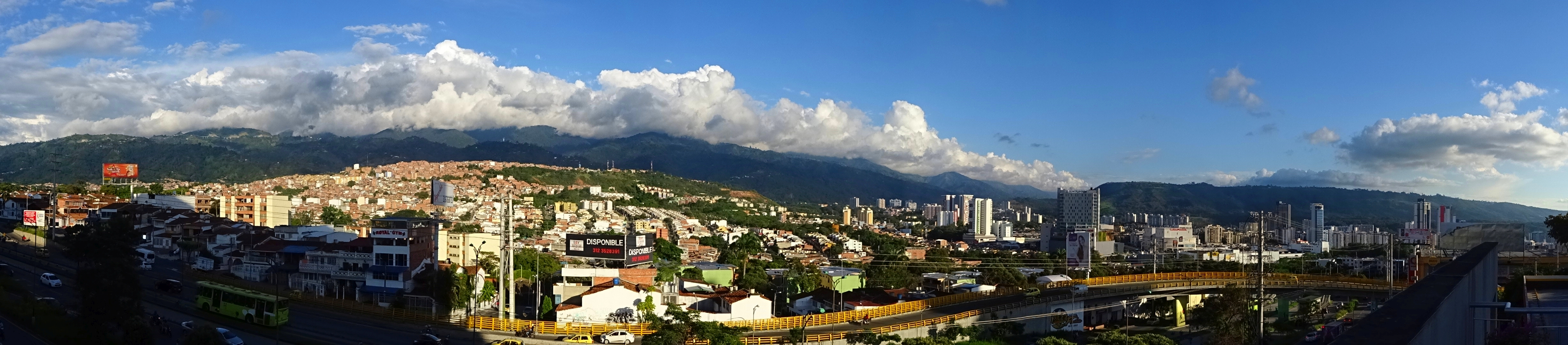
View of the Bucaramanga section of the fault east of Floridablanca, Santander

== See also ==
- List of earthquakes in Colombia
- Cesar-Ranchería Basin
- Middle Magdalena Valley
- Taganga

== Notes and references ==
=== Bibliography ===
- Cediel, Fabio; Shaw, Robert P.; Cáceres, Carlos (2003), "Tectonic Assembly of the Northern Andean Block - The Circum-Gulf of Mexico and the Caribbean: Hydrocarbon habitats, basin formation, and plate tectonics", AAPG Memoir, 79: 815–848
- Colmenares, Lourdes; Zoback, Mark D. (2003), "Stress field and seismotectonics of northern South America", Geology, 31 (8): 721–724, Bibcode:2003Geo....31..721C, doi:10.1130/G19409.1
- Cuéllar Cárdenas, Mario Andrés; López Isaza, Julián Andrés; Osorio Naranjo, Jairo Alonso; Carrillo Lombana, Edgar Joaquín (2012), "Análisis estructural del segmento Bucaramanga del Sistema de Fallas de Bucaramanga (SFB) entre los municipios de Pailitas y Curumaní, Cesar - Colombia" (PDF), Boletín de Geología, Universidad Industrial de Santander, 34: 73–101
- Diederix, Hans; Hernández M., Catalina; Torres J., Eliana; Osorio, Jairo Alonso; Botero, Paola (2009), "Resultados preliminares del primer estudio paleosismológico a lo largo de la Falla de Bucaramanga, Colombia", Ingeniería, Investigación y Desarrollo, UPTC, 9: 18–23
- Egbue, Obi; Kellogg, James; Aguirre, Hector; Torres, Carolina (2014), "Evolution of the stress and strain fields in the Eastern Cordillera, Colombia", Journal of Structural Geology, 58: 8–21, Bibcode:2014JSG....58....8E, doi:10.1016/j.jsg.2013.10.004
- Idárraga García, Javier; Posada, Blanca Oliva; Guzmán, Georgina (2011), "Geomorfología de la zona costera adyacente al piedemonte occidental de la Sierra Nevada de Santa Marta entre los sectores de Pozos Colorados y el Río Córdoba, Caribe Colombiano", Boletín de Investigaciones Marinas y Costeras, INVEMAR, 40: 41–58
- Jiménez Díaz, Giovanny (2013), Relationship between curved thrust belts, rift inversion, oblique convergence and strike-slip faulting - an example of Eastern Cordillera in Colombia (PhD thesis), Università di Roma, pp. 1–106
- Nevistic, A.V.; Rossello, E.A.; Haring, C.E.; Covellone, G.; Bettini, F.; Rodríguez, H.; Salay, R.; Colo, C.; Araque, E. Castro, C. Pinilla, C.P. Bordarampé, L. (2003), The Andean Santander-Oriental Tectonic Syntaxis: A first-order pattern controlling exploration play-model concepts in Colombia, VIII Simposio Bolivariano - Exploración Petrolera en las Cuencas Subandinas, pp. 130–134
- Paris, Gabriel; Machette, Michael N.; Dart, Richard L.; Haller, Kathleen M. (2000), Map and Database of Quaternary Faults and Folds in Colombia and its Offshore Regions (PDF), USGS, pp. 1–66
- Perico Martínez, Néstor Rafael; Perico Granados, Néstor Rafael (2014), Caracterización y recurrencia sísmica del Nido de Bucaramanga, V Congreso Internacional de Ingeniería Civil, Universidad Santo Tomás Seccional Tunja, pp. 1–19
- Posada Posada, Blanca Oliva; Andrade, Carlos A.; Thomas, Yves-François (2012), "Estructura del subsuelo de la plataforma continental aledaña a las estribaciones de la Sierra Nevada de Santa Marta, bahías de Taganga, Santa Marta y Gaira", Boletín Científico, CIOH, 30 (30): 93–104, doi:10.26640/22159045.245, hdl:1834/14769
- Sánchez, Javier; Horton, Brian K.; Tesón, Eliseo; Mora, Andrés; Ketcham, Richard A.; Stockli, Daniel F. (2012), "Kinematic evolution of Andean fold-thrust structures along the boundary between the Eastern Cordillera and Middle Magdalena Valley basin, Colombia", Tectonics, 31 (3): 1–24, Bibcode:2012Tecto..31.3008S, doi:10.1029/2011TC003089
- Various, Authors (2016), Informe de coyuntura económica regional - Departamento de Magdalena (PDF), DANE, pp. 1–99
- Yarce, Jefferson; Monsalve, Gaspar; Becker, Thorsten W.; Cardona, Agustín; Poveda, Esteban; Alvira, Daniel; Ordoñez Carmona, Oswaldo (2014), "Seismological observations in Northwestern South America: Evidence for two subduction segments, contrasting crustal thicknesses and upper mantle flow", Tectonophysics, 637: 57–67, Bibcode:2014Tectp.637...57Y, doi:10.1016/j.tecto.2014.09.006

==== Maps ====
- Hernández, Marina; Clavijo, Jairo (1998), Plancha 11 - Santa Marta - 1:100,000, INGEOMINAS, p. 1
- Hernández, Marina; Maldonado, Iván (1999), Plancha 18 - Ciénaga - 1:100,000, INGEOMINAS, p. 1
- Colmenares, Fabio; Mesa, Milena; Roncancio, Jairo; Arciniegas, Edgar; Pedraza, Pablo; Cardona, Agustín; Silva, César; Romero, Jhoamna; Alvarado and Oscar Romero, Felipe Vargas, Carlos Santamaría, Sonia (2007), Plancha 19 - Sierra Nevada de Santa Marta - 1:100,000, INGEOMINAS, p. 1
- Colmenares, Fabio; Mesa, Milena; Roncancio, Jairo; Arciniegas, Edgar; Pedraza, Pablo; Cardona, Agustín; Silva, César; Romero, Jhoamna; Alvarado and Oscar Romero, Felipe Vargas, Carlos Santamaría, Sonia (2007), Plancha 26 - Pueblobello - 1:100,000, INGEOMINAS, p. 1
- Colmenares, Fabio; Mesa, Milena; Roncancio, Jairo; Arciniegas, Edgar; Pedraza, Pablo; Cardona, Agustín; Silva, César; Romero, Jhoamna; Alvarado and Oscar Romero, Felipe Vargas, Carlos Santamaría, Sonia (2007), Plancha 33 - El Copey - 1:100,000, INGEOMINAS, p. 1
- González, Javier; Clavijo, Jairo; Hernández, Marina; García, Carlos (2002), Plancha 40 - Bosconia - 1:100,000, INGEOMINAS, p. 1
- Hernández, Marina; Clavijo, Jairo; González, Javier (2001), Plancha 47 - Chiriguaná - 1:100,000, INGEOMINAS, p. 1
- Bernal Vargas, Luis Enrique; Mantilla Figueroa, Luis Carlos (2006), Plancha 55 - El Banco - 1:100,000, INGEOMINAS, p. 1
- Royero, José María; Clavijo, Jairo; Mendoza, Hernando; Barbosa, Gonzalo; Vargas, G.; Bernal, R.E.; Ferreira, P. (1994), Plancha 65 - Tamalameque - 1:100,000, INGEOMINAS, p. 1
- Daconte, Rommel; Salinas, Rosalba; Royero, José María; Clavijo, Jairo; Arias, Alfonso; Carvajal, Luz S.; López, Martín E.; Angarita, Leonidas; Mendoza, Hernando (2009), Plancha 66 - Miraflores - 1:100,000, INGEOMINAS, p. 1
- Daconte, Rommel; Salinas, Rosalba (1980), Plancha 76 - Ocaña - 1:100,000, INGEOMINAS, p. 1
- Vargas, Rodrigo; Arias, Alfonso (1981), Plancha 86 - Ábrego - 1:100,000, INGEOMINAS, p. 1
- Vargas, Rodrigo; Arias, Alfonso (1981), Plancha 97 - Cáchira - 1:100,000, INGEOMINAS, p. 1
- Ward, Dwight E.; Goldsmith, Richard; Jimeno, Andrés; Cruz, Jaime; Restrepo, Hernán; Gómez, Eduardo (1977), Plancha 120 - Bucaramanga - 1:100,000, INGEOMINAS, p. 1
- Vargas, Rodrigo; Arias, Alfonso; Jaramillo, Luis; Tellez, Noel (1984), Plancha 136 - Málaga - 1:100,000, INGEOMINAS, p. 1
