= Floridablanca, Santander =

Floridablanca
- Municipality
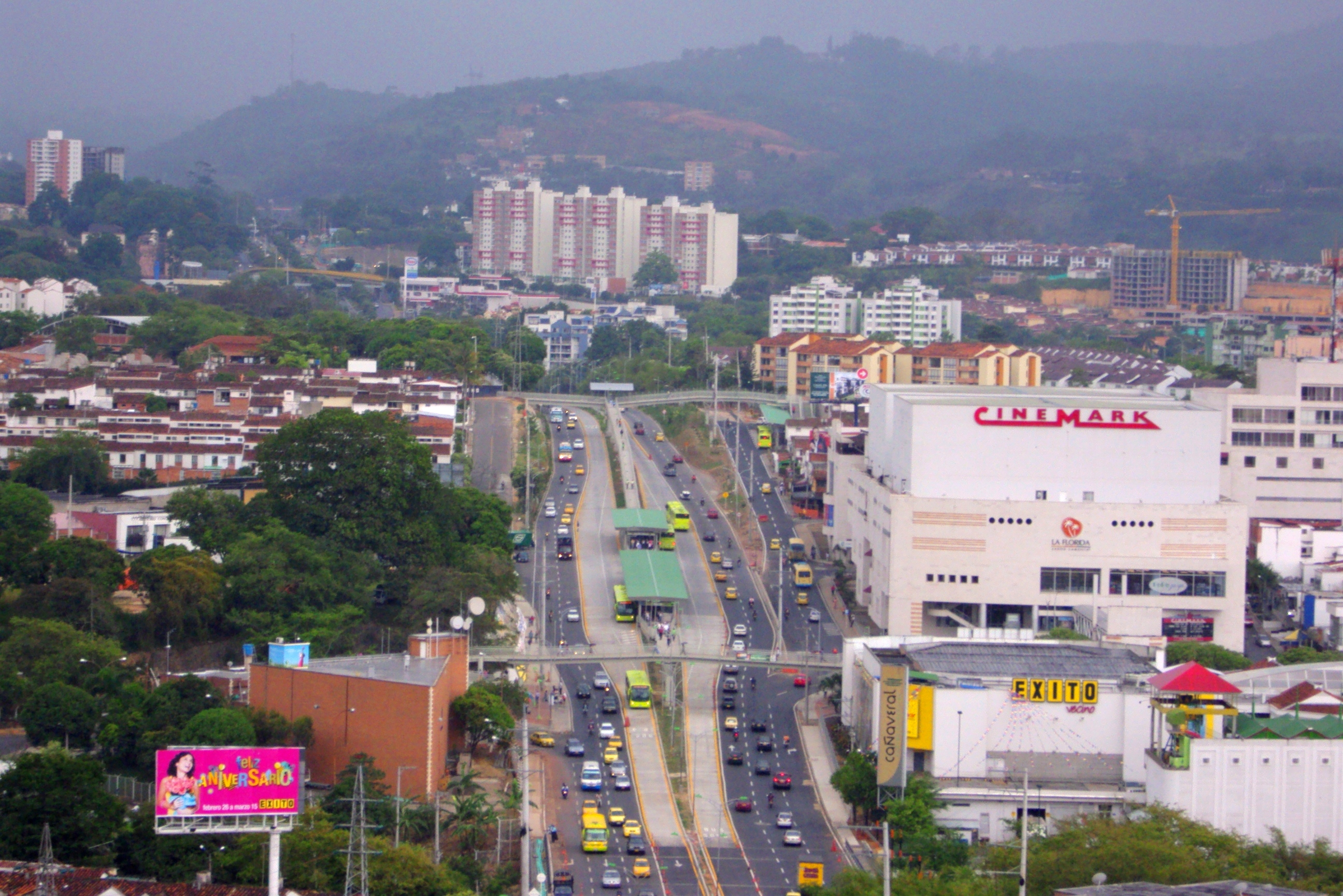
- View of Cañaveral, the central hotspot of Floridablanca

- Flag Coat of arms

- Location of Floridablanca in Santander

- Location within Colombia
- Coordinates: 07°13′N 73°04′W
- Country: Colombia
- Region: Andes
- Department: Santander
- Province: Soto
- Founded: 7 November 1817
- Founder: Javier Guerra de Mier

Government
  - Mayor: Hector Mantilla Rueda (2016-2019)

Area
  - Municipality: 100.3 km^{2} (38.7 sq mi)
  - Urban: 17.04 km^{2} (6.58 sq mi)
- Elevation: 925 m (3,035 ft)

Population (2020 est.)
  - Municipality: 307,896
  - Density: 3,070/km^{2} (7,951/sq mi)
  - Urban: 295,724
  - Urban density: 17,350/km^{2} (44,950/sq mi)
- Demonym: Florideño
- Time zone: UTC-5
- Area code: 57 + 7
- Website: Official website

Floridablanca (Spanish pronunciation: [floˌɾiðaˈβlaŋka], locally also simply Florida) is a municipality in the department of Santander situated at an altitude of 925 metres (3,035 ft) in the Eastern Ranges of the Colombian Andes. It is part of the metropolitan area of the departmental capital Bucaramanga. Floridablanca is known for its parks and the Piedra del Sol, a large rock with spirals and circles carved by the Guane over 1,000 years ago. This city is home of the tallest statue of Jesus Christ in Colombia, "El Santisimo". The statue is 40 metres (130 ft) high and weighs 40 tonnes (88,000 lb). The city is situated along the Ruta Nacional 45A, a branch of the Pan American Highway, connecting the capital Bogotá with Santa Marta at the Caribbean coast and Cúcuta as a gateway to Venezuela. Together with other neighboring municipalities of Bucaramanga, Girón and Piedecuesta, Floridablanca is one of the growth areas for the capital of Santander with numerous constructions happening in recent years.

== Geography and climate ==
Floridablanca is situated at an altitude of about 925 metres (3,035 ft) in the Eastern Ranges of the Colombian Andes, though locally the topography varies greatly. To the east of the city the higher mountains of the Andes rise above the city, thrusted upwards by the north–south-trending Bucaramanga-Santa Marta Fault, one of the major megaregional faults of Colombia. The area is dominated by the Bucaramanga Nest, the second-most seismically active region in the world. Because of the relatively low altitude, the city enjoys a very favorable climate all year round. Floridablanca's climate is classified as tropical. When compared with winter, the summers have much more rainfall. The climate is classified as Aw (tropical savanna climate) by the Köppen-Geiger system. The average annual temperature is 23.6 °C (74.5 °F) in Floridablanca. The rainfall averages 1,055 millimetres (41.5 in) per year.

Floridablanca - 925 m (3,035 ft)

Climate chart (precipitation, max. and min. temperature)
J	F	M	A	M	J	J	A	S	O	N	D
58 29 19	71 29 19	90 29 20	118 28 19	108 29 19	82 28 19	59 29 19	80 29 19	92 29 19	139 28 19	101 28 19	57 28 19
- █ Average max. and min. temperatures in °C
- █ Precipitation totals in mm
- Source: Climate-data.org - Floridablanca
Imperial conversion
J	F	M	A	M	J	J	A	S	O	N	D
2.3 83 66	2.8 84 66	3.5 83 67	4.6 83 67	4.3 83 67	3.2 83 66	2.3 83 66	3.1 84 66	3.6 84 66	5.5 82 66	4 82 66	2.2 82 65
- █ Average max. and min. temperatures in °F
- █ Precipitation totals in inches

== Geology and biology ==
The surrounding areas of urban Floridablanca are composed of the Jurassic Girón and Jordán formations, to the east of the Bucaramanga-Santa Marta Fault, running north–south in the east of the municipality, the Precambrian Bucaramanga Gneiss and Early Jurassic La Corcova Quartzmonzonite crop out and the Ruitoque Massif comprises the Tambor Formation.

The rural areas surrounding the city are home to the endemic San Gil climbing salamander (Bolitoglossa nicefori).

== History ==
Before the Spanish conquest, the area of Floridablanca was populated by the Guane. The Guane were submitted to the rule of the Spanish Empire by conquistador Martín Galeano when he founded Vélez in 1539, until then part of the Muisca Confederation. Modern Floridablanca was founded on 7 November 1817 as "Floridablanca de San Juan Nepomuceno" by Javier Guerra de Mier. The church of San Juan Nepomuceno finished construction in 1832.

== Demography ==
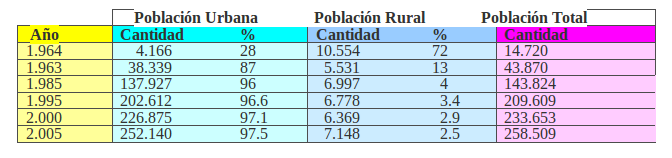
Growth of the city's population from 1964 to 2005

According to official DANE census, Floridablanca has 262,165 inhabitants, being the second most populated city in Santander. 47,37% are men, while 52,63% are women. 95,6% of the population over 5 years know how to write and read, meaning, illiteracy rate is about 4,4%.

Statistics show that most of the adult people living in the city are from Bucaramanga:

- 7,7% from Floridablanca
- 44% from Bucaramanga
- 33% from other cities of Santander
- 16% from other departments

== Economy ==
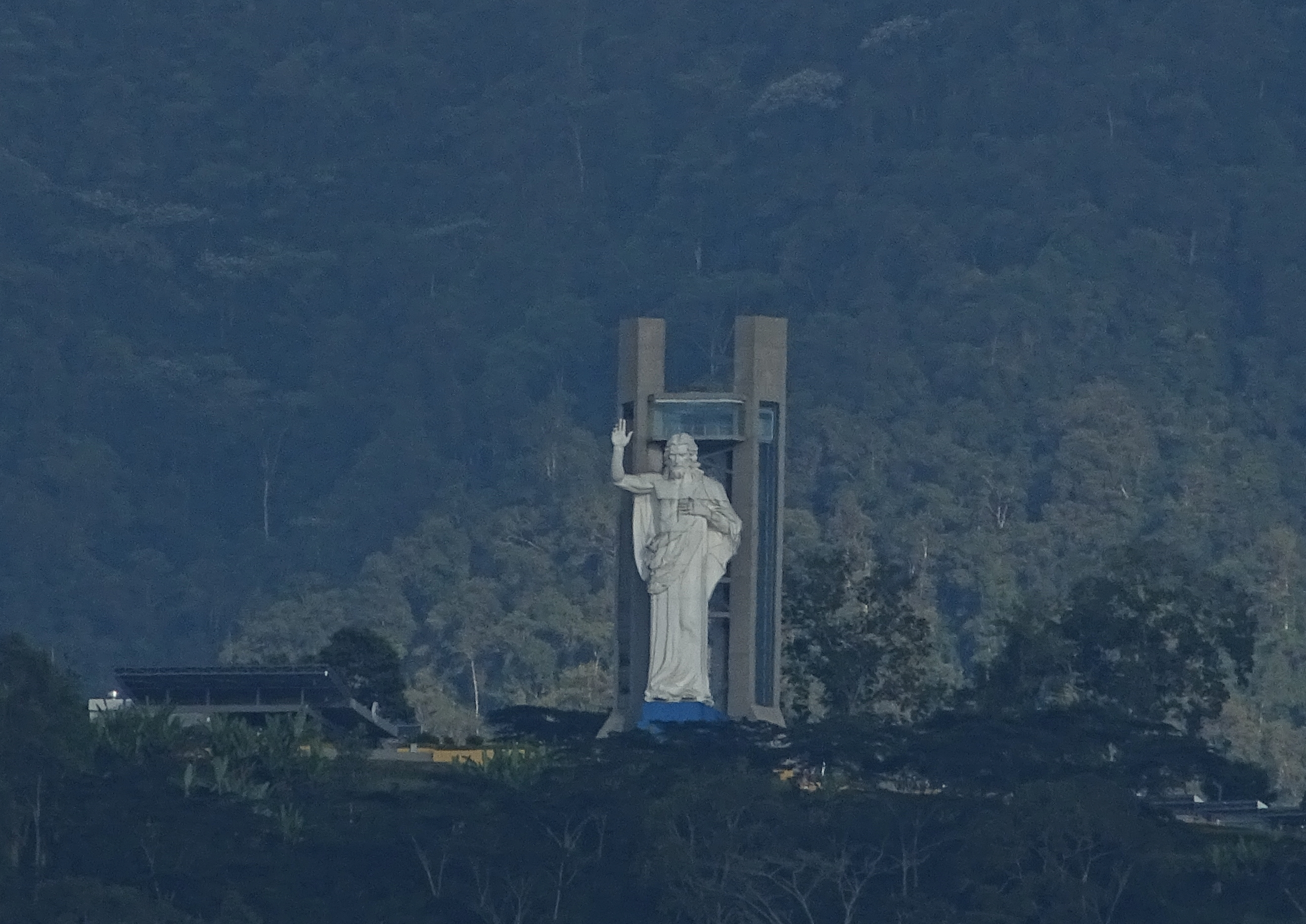
Statue of Jesus Christ overlooking Floridablanca from the east

A study performed in 1998 provided data on the economical activities in Floridablanca, that has grown since those times. Commerce was the most important sector with 39% of the economical make-up, industrial production of clothing was nearly 10% and the food and drinks industry comprised 7% of the economical activities. The production of sweets, and especially the traditional Colombian dessert of obleas, has given Floridablanca the name "the sweet municipality of Colombia".

The central part of the city hosts a concentration of malls; Cañaveral, constructed in 1984, and Parque Caracolí, inaugurated in 2013.

The city, in recent years grown to connect with Bucaramanga, forms the entry point to the Chicamocha Canyon, located at an hour drive from the city, and hosts touristic activities with a paragliding school on the Mesa de Ruitoque, the Ruitoque Massif in the southwest of the city. Local buses to tourist hotspots as San Gil and the Chicamocha Canyon leave from a transport station called "Papi Quiero Piña" ("Dad, I want pineapple").

The Jardín Botánico Eloy Valenzuela, a botanical garden in Floridablanca, was once owned by the El Paragüitas tobacco company.

In 2017, the city was designated by the Ministry of Commerce, Industry and Tourism as one of five "sustainable touristic destinations" of Colombia.

== Schools ==
Some of the schools located in Floridablanca are:

- Colegio Santa Isabel de Hungría in Spanish
- Colegio Nuevo Cambridge in Spanish

== Panoramas ==
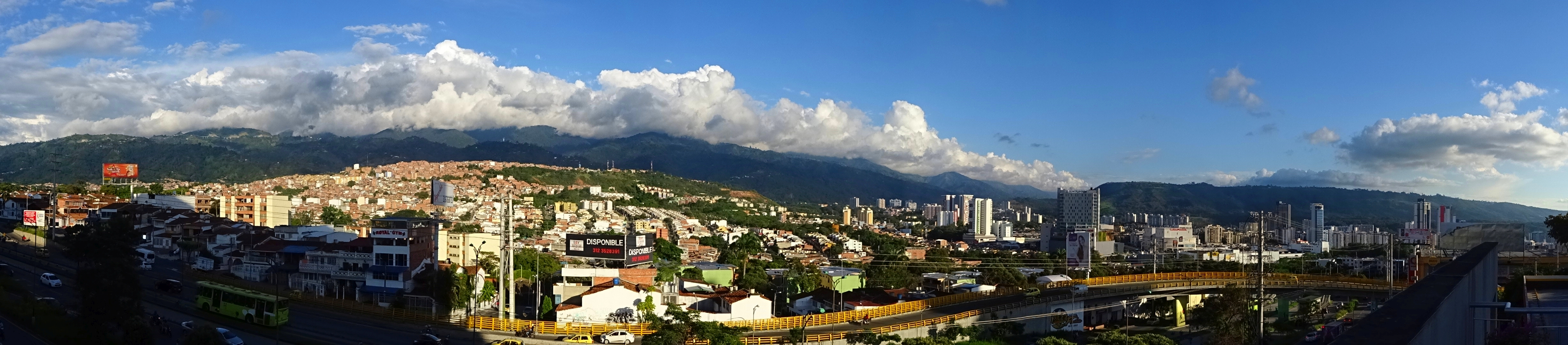
View of Floridablanca with the Bucaramanga-Santa Marta Fault in the background and the Ruitoque Massif to the right.
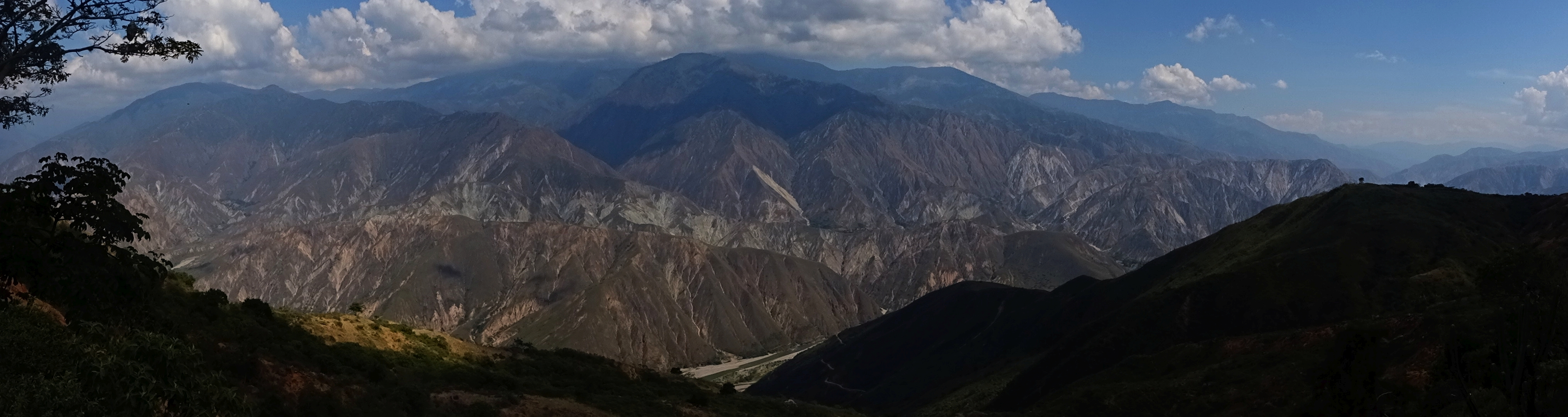
View of the Chicamocha Canyon, accessible at an hours drive south of Floridablanca.
