= Santa Rita Fault =

- Falla de Santa Rita
- Location within Colombia
- Etymology: Santa Rita de Ituango
- Coordinates: 07°23′25.5″N 75°35′11″W
- Country: Colombia
- Region: Andean
- State: Antioquia

Characteristics
- Range: Central Ranges, Andes
- Part of: Andean strike-slip faults
- Length: 81.0 km (50.3 mi)
- Strike: 010.6 ± 6
- Dip: East
- Dip angle: High
- Displacement: ~0.01–0.1 mm (0.00039–0.00394 in)/yr

Tectonics
- Plate: North Andean
- Status: Active?
- Earthquakes: Possibly historic
- Type: Strike-slip fault
- Movement: Sinistral
- Age: Quaternary
- Orogeny: Andean

The Santa Rita Fault (Spanish: Falla de Santa Rita) is a strike-slip fault in the department of Antioquia in northern Colombia. The fault has a total length of 81.0 kilometres (50.3 mi) and runs along an average north to south strike of 010.6 ± 6 in the Central Ranges of the Colombian Andes.

== Etymology ==
The fault is named after Santa Rita de Ituango.

== Description ==
The Santa Rita Fault displaces metamorphosed volcanic and sedimentary rocks through most of its length; in the northern part, the fault places Cretaceous basic volcanic rocks against Tertiary and Quaternary sedimentary rocks. To the south, the Santa Rita Fault intercepts the Espíritu Santo Fault. The fault has a well-defined fault trace seen on satellite images. The trace is characterized by linear valleys, strong breaks in slope, offset alluvial fans and colluvial deposits, and local subsidence of the soil. The Santa Rita Fault might be the source of a historic magnitude 4.8 earthquake.

== See also ==
- List of earthquakes in Colombia
- Romeral Fault System
