= Otú Norte Fault =

Inactive fault in northern Colombia

- Falla de Otú Norte; Otú-Pericos Fault
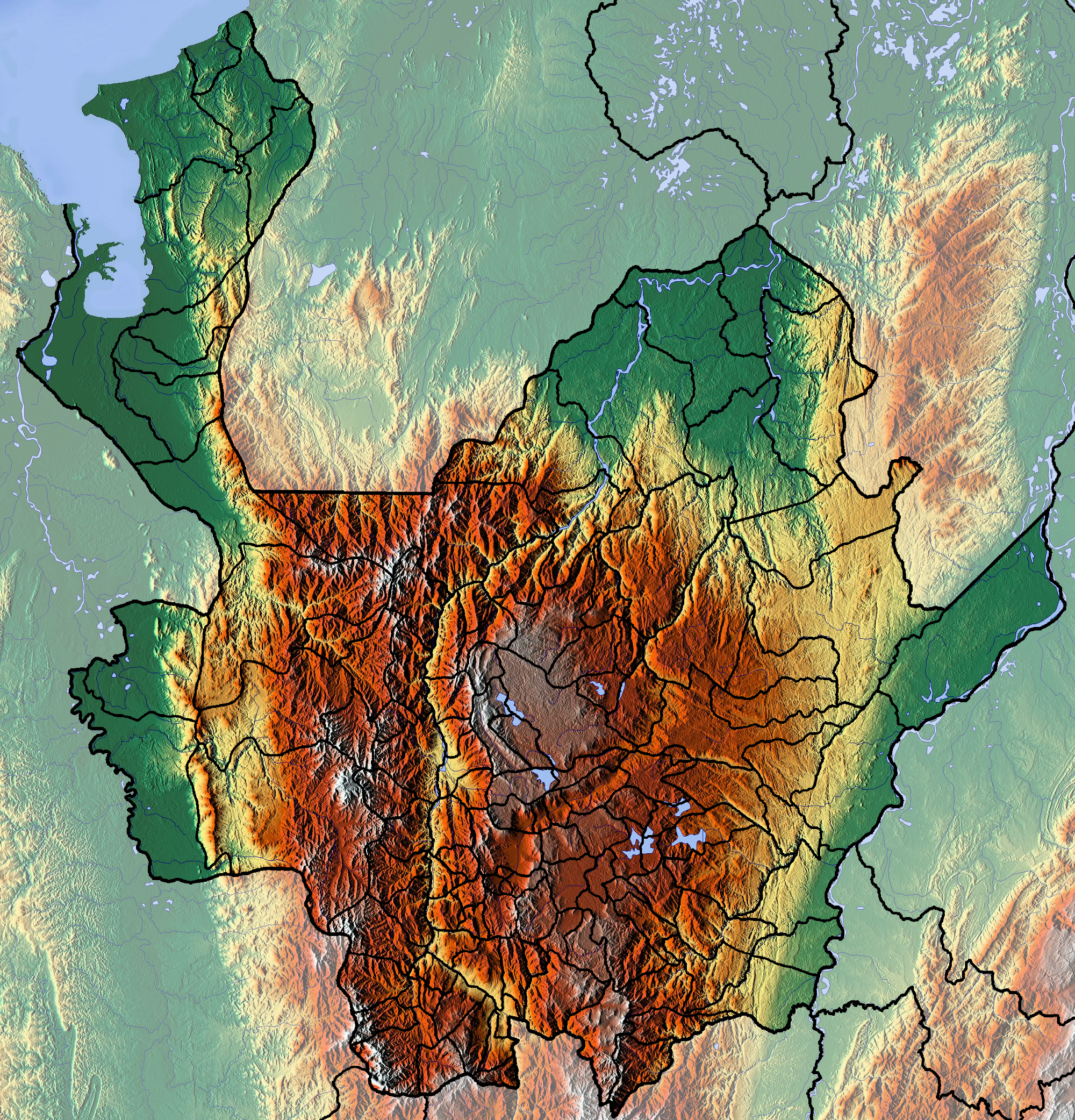
- Location within Colombia Location within Antioquia Department
- Etymology: Otú
- Named by: Feininger et al.
- Year defined: 1972
- Coordinates: 07°09′18.6″N 74°47′05.5″W
- Country: Colombia
- Region: Andean
- State: Antioquia
- Cities: Remedios, Segovia, Zaragoza

Characteristics
- Range: Central Ranges, Andes
- Part of: Andean strike-slip faults
- Length: 144.4 km (89.7 mi)
- Strike: 346.4 ± 8
- Dip: East
- Dip angle: High
- Displacement: 66 km (41 mi); Slip rate <0.2 mm (0.0079 in)/yr

Tectonics
- Plate: North Andean
- Status: Inactive
- Type: Oblique-slip fault strike-slip fault
- Movement: Reverse sinistral
- Rock units: Cajamarca Complex, Santa Isabel Stock, Antioquia Batholith & Segovia Batholith, San Lucas Complex
- Age: Quaternary
- Orogeny: Andean

The Otú Norte or Otú-Pericos Fault (Spanish: Falla de Otú Norte) is an inactive sinistral oblique strike-slip fault in the department of Antioquia in northern Colombia. The fault has a total length of 144.4 kilometres (89.7 mi) and runs along an average north-northwest to south-southeast strike of 346.4 ± 8, cross-cutting the northern part of the Central Ranges of the Colombian Andes. Together with the parallel Bagre Norte Fault the fault separates the Central Ranges from its northeasternmost continuation, the Serranía de San Lucas.

== Etymology ==
The fault was by Feininger et al. in 1972 named after Otú Airport in vereda Otú in Remedios, Antioquia.

== Description ==
The Otú Norte Fault crosses the northern part of the Central Ranges of the Colombian Andes. The fault strikes north-northwest to south-southeast and appears to branch off the Palestina Fault. The Otú Fault extends in a northwest direction to near Nechí, where it is covered by young Quaternary deposits. The sinistral oblique reverse fault separates blocks of totally dissimilar geology and lithology; the metamorphic Precambrian San Lucas Complex and Jurassic igneous rocks (diorites) of the Segovia Batholith on the east are juxtaposed against the Cretaceous Santa Isabel Stock and Paleozoic quartz-feldspar gneisses and quartzitic arc rocks of the Cajamarca Complex on the west. Just west of Remedios, the fault forms the contact between the Cretaceous Antioquia and Jurassic Segovia Batholiths. The northern end apparently splays into several faults that cross the Nechí River.

=== Activity ===
A rate of less than 0.2 millimetres (0.0079 in) per year is estimated for the fault, considered inactive. Displaced Quaternary terraces as high as 140 metres (460 ft) are reported and the fault offsets the Tertiary erosion surface of the Central Ranges. A total displacement of the fault has been estimated at 66 kilometres (41 mi).

== Economic importance ==
The fault separates two major gold mining areas in Antioquia; the Segovia-Remedios mining district and La Ye mine in the east, and the placer deposits of Gramalote and Cisneros in the west. North of Zaragoza, the fault underlies the El Limón mine. Antioquia produces 50% of all gold in Colombia.

The ductile zone of the fault produced mylonites in mainly the amphibolite facies of the Segovia Batholith. This ductile behavior was later overprinted by fragile tectonics, leaving cataclasis and fault breccias in the fault zone as well as striations in the quartz of the batholith. These deformations are interpreted as second grade Riedel shears.

== See also ==
- List of earthquakes in Colombia
- Romeral Fault System
- Bagre Norte Fault
