= Rionegro, Santander =

Rionegro
- Municipality and town
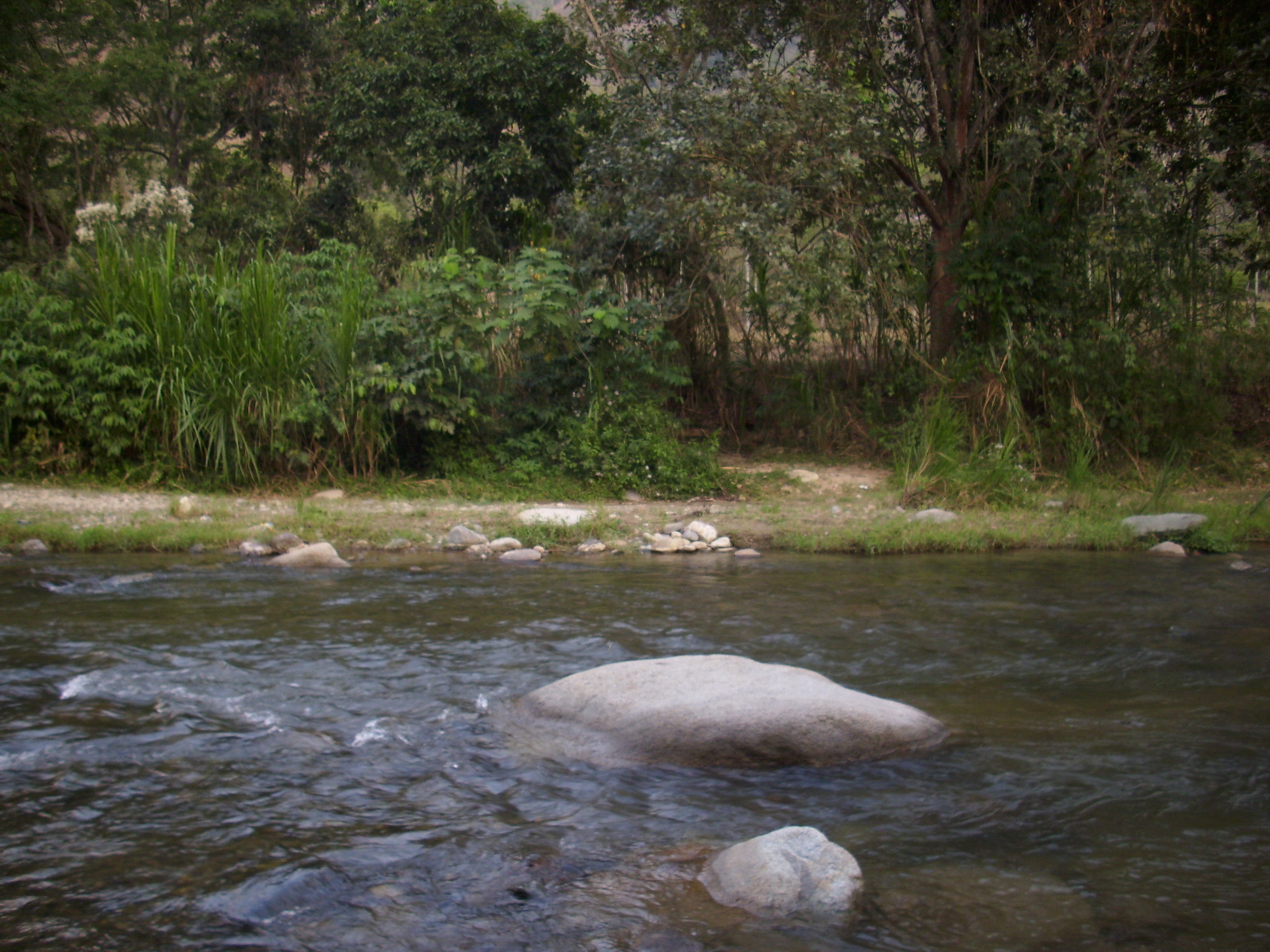
- Río Negro in Rionegro

- Flag
- Etymology: Río Negro
- Location of Rionegro in Santander

- Location of Rionegro in Colombia
- Coordinates: 7.15361°N 73.1536°W
- Country: Colombia
- Department: Santander
- Founded: 5 May 1805

Government
  - Mayor: Wilson Vicente Gonzalez Reyes (2016-2019)

Area
  - Total: 1,064 km^{2} (411 sq mi)
- Elevation: 590 m (1,940 ft)

Population (2015)
  - Total: 27,114
  - Density: 25.48/km^{2} (66.00/sq mi)
- Time zone: UTC-5 (Colombia Standard Time)
- Website: Official website

Rionegro (Spanish pronunciation: [rioˈneɣɾo]) is a town and municipality in the department of Santander in northeastern Colombia. The urban centre of Rionegro is located at an altitude of 590 metres (1,940 ft) in the Eastern Ranges of the Colombian Andes, 20 kilometres (12 mi) north of the departmental capital Bucaramanga. The municipality is named after the Río Negro.

== Gallery ==
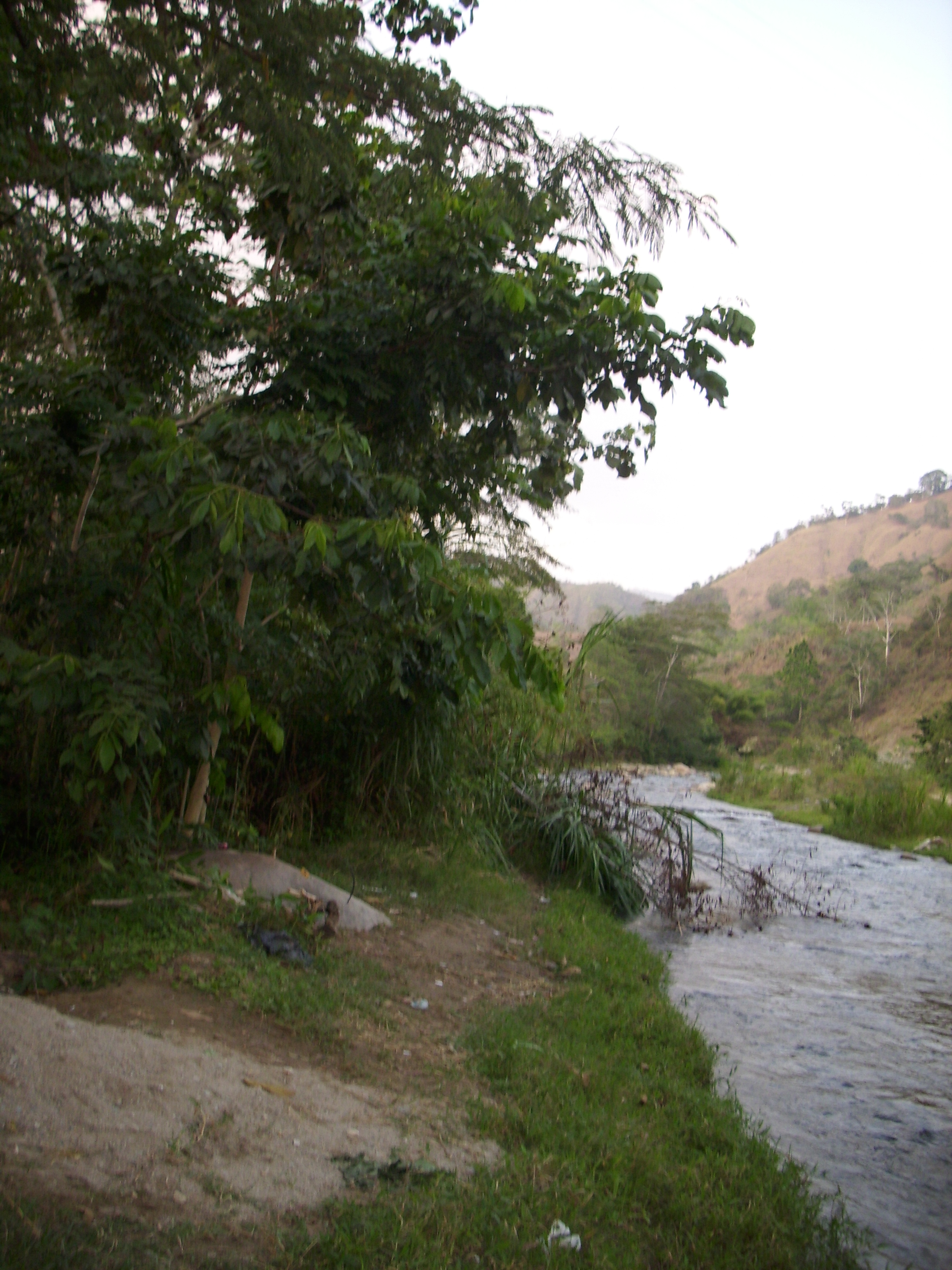
Río Negro in Rionegro
