= North Andes plate =

Small tectonic plate in South America

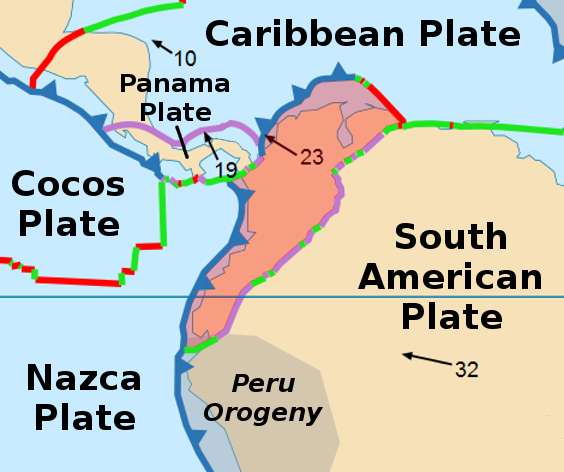
- North Andes plate (note: outdated Nazca plate)
- Type: Micro
- Movement^{1}: North-west
- Speed^{1}: 23mm/year
- Features: Colombia; Ecuador; Venezuela
- ^{1}Relative to the African plate

The North Andes plate or North Andes block is a small tectonic plate (microplate) located in the northern Andes. It is squeezed between the faster-moving South American plate to the east and the Nazca plate to the west. Due to the subduction of the Coiba and Malpelo plates, this area is very prone to volcanic and seismic activity, with many historical earthquakes.

== Boundaries ==
The North Andes plate is bound by (clockwise from north):

1. Caribbean plate
2. South American plate
3. Malpelo plate – considered a part of the Nazca plate before 2017
4. Coiba plate – considered a part of the Nazca plate before 2016
5. Panama plate

== Terranes ==
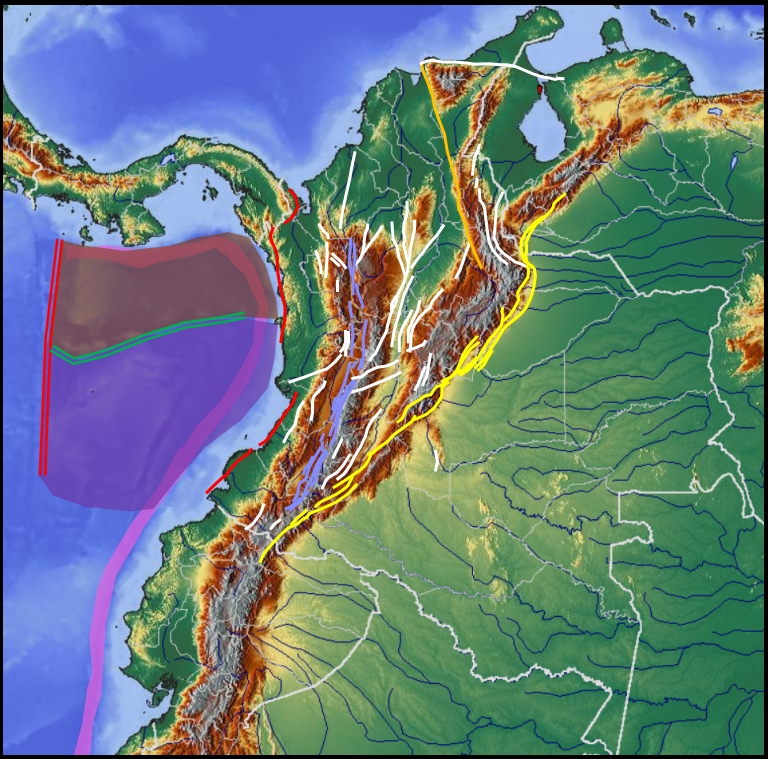
• Chibcha terrane is enclosed by the Bucaramanga-Santa Marta Fault (BSF, orange), northernmost Oca Fault (Oca, white), Eastern Frontal Fault System (EFFS, yellow) and Romeral Fault System (RFS, violet) • Tahamí terrane is enclosed by BSF, OCA and RFS • Anacona, Arqúia and Quebradagrande terranes are emplaced by RFS • La Guajira terrane is enclosed by BSF and northernmost by Oca • Caribe terrane is enclosed by BSF, RFS and plate boundaries with Coiba (red) and Malpelo plates (purple) Geological terranes map of Colombia

The Colombian part of the North Andes plate is subdivided into several terranes:

Terranes belonging to the Colombian part of the North Andes plate
Abbr	Name	Age range	Paleomap	Basins	Complexes	Ranges	Departments	Comments	Notes
CHT	Chibcha	Mesoproterozoic		• Catatumbo • Cesar-Ranchería • Eastern Cordillera (Altiplano Cundiboyacense – Bogotá) • VMM • VSM	Ariarí, Garzón, Floresta, Quetame, Santander	Central, Eastern, Perijá, SNSM, San Lucas, La Macarena	Antioquia, Arauca, Bogotá, Bolívar, Boyacá, Caquetá, Casanare, Cesar, Cundinamarca, Huila, Magdalena, Meta, Putumayo, Norte de Santander, Santander, Tolima	Largest terrane, named after Chibcha	
CHT	Chibcha	Neoproterozoic		• Catatumbo • Cesar-Ranchería • Eastern Cordillera (Altiplano Cundiboyacense – Bogotá) • VMM • VSM	Ariarí, Garzón, Floresta, Quetame, Santander	Central, Eastern, Perijá, SNSM, San Lucas, La Macarena	Antioquia, Arauca, Bogotá, Bolívar, Boyacá, Caquetá, Casanare, Cesar, Cundinamarca, Huila, Magdalena, Meta, Putumayo, Norte de Santander, Santander, Tolima	Largest terrane, named after Chibcha	
TA	Anacona	Devonian		none	Anacona	Central	Antioquia	Tiny terrane	
TA	Anacona	Carboniferous		none	Anacona	Central	Antioquia	Tiny terrane	
TT	Tahamí	Permian		• Amagá • Cocinetas • VIM	Antioquia	Central, Macuira, SNSM	Antioquia, Bolívar, Caldas, Cauca, La Guajira, Magdalena, Nariño, Risaralda, Sucre, Valle del Cauca	Most extensive terrane	
TT	Tahamí	Triassic		• Amagá • Cocinetas • VIM	Antioquia	Central, Macuira, SNSM	Antioquia, Bolívar, Caldas, Cauca, La Guajira, Magdalena, Nariño, Risaralda, Sucre, Valle del Cauca	Most extensive terrane	
TAR	Arquía	Early Cretaceous		none	Arquía	Central	Antioquia, Caldas, Cauca, Nariño, Quindío, Risaralda, Valle del Cauca	Thinly banded terrane	
TQ	Quebradagrande	Early Cretaceous		none	Quebradagrande	Central	Antioquia, Caldas, Cauca, Nariño, Quindío, Risaralda, Valle del Cauca	Thinly banded terrane	
TC	Caribe	Late Cretaceous		• Cauca-Patía • Chocó • Sinú-San Jacinto • Tumaco • Urabá	Santa Cecilia-La Equis	Central, Western, Darién, Baudó, Montes de María	Antioquia, Atlántico, Caldas, Cauca, Chocó, Córdoba, Nariño, Quindío, Risaralda, Sucre, Valle del Cauca	El Totumo	
TLG	La Guajira	Late Cretaceous		• La Guajira	Etpana, Macuira	Macuira, SNSM	La Guajira, Magdalena	Tayrona, Cabo de la Vela	

=== Tectonics ===
Subduction of the Coiba plate underneath the North Andes plate causes frequent earthquakes in the Bucaramanga Nest, the most seismically active area in the world. The Bucaramanga-Santa Marta Fault stretches along the plate for more than 600 kilometers from north to south. The plate boundary with the South American plate is most tectonically active along a more than 900-kilometer-long megaregional fault system, the Eastern Frontal Fault System.

This fault system, extending into Ecuador and Venezuela all along the northern Andes, separates the terranes from the North Andes plate from:

South American plate features bordering the Chibcha terrane of the North Andes plate
Abbr	Name	Age range	Basins	Complexes	Ranges	Departments	Comments	Notes
PRNJ	Río Negro-Juruena Province	Paleoproterozoic	• Llanos • Putumayo • Amazonas	Mitú, Parguaza, Guaviare	Chiribiquete, Mavecure	Arauca, Caquetá, Casanare, Guainía, Guaviare, Meta, Putumayo, Vaupés, Vichada	Part of Amazonian Craton	

The accreted terranes of the North Andes plate represent a complex geologic history. There have been two instances of intra-oceanic arcs colliding with the continent. The first of these events, which took place ~90–65 Ma, involved the subduction of an intra-oceanic arc beneath the South American/North Andes plate. This subduction led to margin-parallel strike-slip motion and shortening across the entire region. The second major collision occurred approximately 12 Ma, during the Miocene. This event involved closing a ~1200-km-wide middle-Eocene seaway and docking the Panama arc with South America. This second collision event also accelerated strike-slip faulting along the North Andes margin. Reconstruction studies of the area illustrate the complex dynamics of the tectonically active North Andes plate margin.
