= Bucaramanga Nest =

The Bucaramanga Nest is a seismic region located in Colombia. It is named after Bucaramanga, Santander.
