= Oca–Ancón Fault System =

Fault system in Colombia and Venezuela

- Falla Oca-Ancón
- Location of the fault in Venezuela

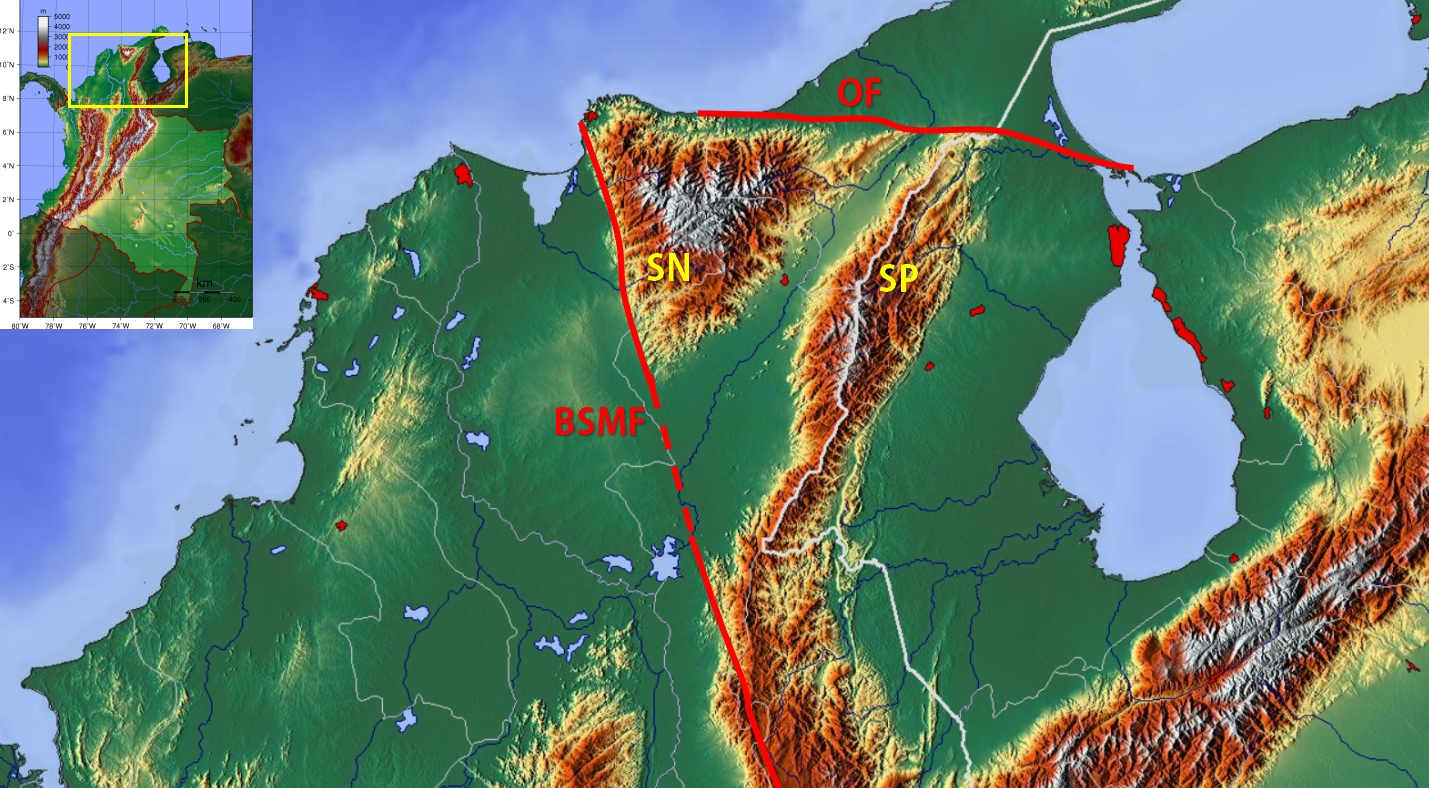
- Topographic map of northern Colombia showing the Oca Fault segment
- Location: Northern South America
- Coordinates: 11°00′N 71°45′W
- Country: Colombia; Venezuela
- Region: Caribbean
- State: La Guajira; Falcón, Zulia
- Cities: Maracaibo

Characteristics
- Range: Sierra Nevada de Santa Marta, Serranía del Perijá, Venezuelan Coastal Range
- Part of: Andean faults
- Segments: Oca, Ancón
- Length: 830 km (520 mi)
- Strike: 275 ± 7 (W-E)
- Dip angle: Vertical to subvertical
- Displacement: 0.2–2 mm (0.0079–0.0787 in)/yr

Tectonics
- Plate: South American
- Status: Active
- Earthquakes: 1834
- Type: Strike-slip fault
- Movement: Dextral
- Age: Late Pleistocene-Holocene
- Orogeny: Andean

The Oca–Ancón Fault System (Spanish: Falla Oca-Ancón) is a complex of geological faults located in northeastern Colombia and northwestern Venezuela near the Caribbean Sea. The fault system is of right-lateral strike-slip type and extends for an approximate length of 830 km (520 mi). The Oca–Ancón Fault System is part of the diffuse boundary between the Caribbean plate and the South American plate. The movement rate of the Oca–Ancón Fault System is estimated at 2 millimetres (0.079 in) each year, more than most Venezuelan faults.

== Oca fault segment ==
The vertical to subvertical Oca fault segment in the western part of the fault system has a length of 265 kilometres (165 mi), running west–east through La Guajira, Colombia. It forms the northern boundary of the Sierra Nevada de Santa Marta and cuts through the Serranía del Perijá continuing into Venezuela. The fault segment with a slip rate of 0.2 to 0.8 millimetres (0.0079 to 0.0315 in) per year has been active since the Late Pleistocene (~15,000 years ago) and its most recent activity has been registered in 1834.
