= Caribbean natural region =

Region of coastal northern Colombia

Caribbean region

Ecology
- Realm: Neotropic
- Biome: Marine, Dry Forest, Rainforest, Montane Forest, Páramo, Desert, Wetlands

Geography
- Country: Colombia
- Oceans or seas: Caribbean Sea
- Rivers: Sinú, Magdalena, Ranchería
- Climate type: Tropical

Conservation
- Global 200: Sierra Nevada de Santa Marta, Ciénaga Grande

The Caribbean region is mostly lowland plains extending from the northern reaches of the Colombian Andes to the Caribbean Sea that are characterized by a variety of ecosystems including: humid forests, dry forests, savannas, wetlands and desert. The Sierra Nevada de Santa Marta rise from the plains to snow-capped peaks, separated from the Andes as an isolated area of high biodiversity and endemism. It contains one of the largest marshes in Colombia, the Ciénaga Grande de Santa Marta. The main river is the Magdalena which is fully navigable in the region and a major path for the flow of shipments to and from inland Colombia.

== Biogeographical subregions ==
The Caribbean region contains 6 subregions which differ in certain natural aspects.

=== Guajira Peninsula ===
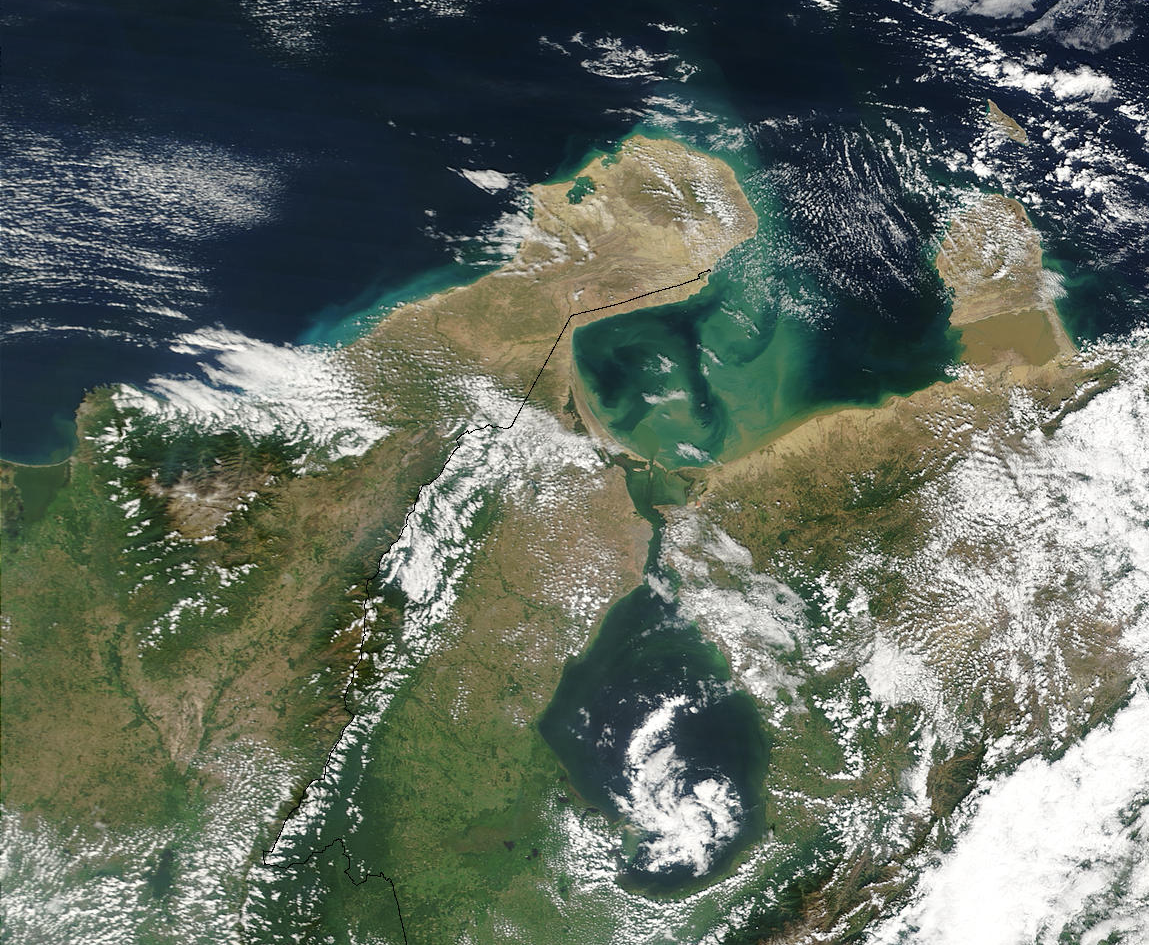
The Guajira Peninsula on the left of Gulf of Venezuela and south of the Caribbean Sea. The peninsula is the northernmost point of Colombia and South America.

The Guajira Peninsula is the most northerly point of South America and mostly desertic due to the rain shadow of the high Sierra Nevada de Santa Marta and is only crossed by the Ranchería River with no other major water courses in the area; thus water is scarce. A small mountain range, the Serranía de Macuira, is located in the tip of the peninsula and contains a unique dwarf cloud forest completely surrounded by desert. Large estuaries near Riohacha are protected as the SFF Los Flamencos which is meant to protect the habitat for the American flamingo.

=== Sierra Nevada de Santa Marta ===
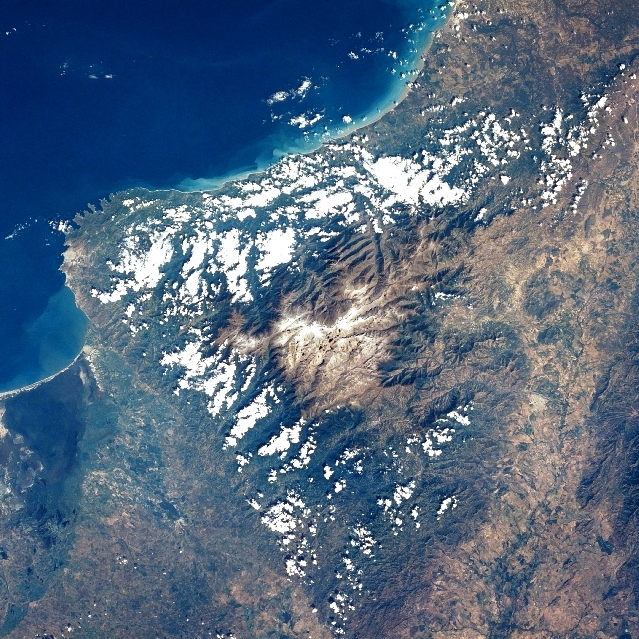
the Sierra Nevada de Santa Marta as viewed from space.

=== Caribbean Savanna and Magdalena Delta ===
The Magdalena River basin extends from the Andes through the Magdalena River valley and into the Caribbean plains, where major tributaries integrate into the floodplain. The massive Ciénaga Grande de Santa Marta is situated between the delta and the base of the Sierra Nevada de Santa Marta.

The Caribbean savanna extends from the delta west toward the Sinú River. A small range of mountains called the Montes de María are found here and part of them are protected as the Los Colorados Sanctuary.

=== Valley of the San Jorge River ===
The San Jorge River rises in the northern end of the West Andes and flows northeast to flow into the Cauca River. Large swaths of the valley are covered by marshes like the Ciénaga de Ayapel.

=== Valley of the Sinú River ===
The Sinú River flows through the Sinú Valley dry forests ecoregion.

=== Gulf of Urabá ===
The Gulf of Urabá

== Protected areas ==
- PNN Corales del Rosario y San Bernardo
- SFF Ciénaga Grande de Santa Marta
- PNN Tayrona
- PNN Sierra Nevada de Santa Marta
- PNN Macuira
- SFF Los Colorados
- SFF Los Flamencos
- SFF El Corchal "El mono Hernández"
- Salamanca Island Road Park

== See also ==
- Caribbean Region, Colombia
