= Chibcha terrane =

Geological province in Colombia

- Stratigraphic range: Meso-Neoproterozoic; ~1200–600 Ma
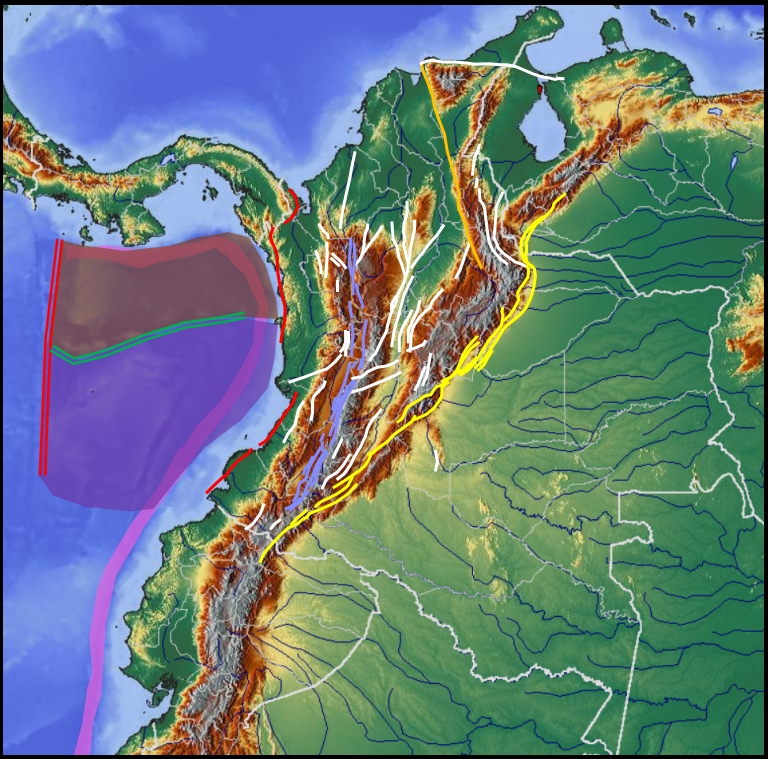
- Chibcha terrane is enclosed by the Bucaramanga–Santa Marta Fault (orange), northernmost Oca Fault (white), Eastern Frontal Fault System (yellow) and Romeral fault system (violet)
- Type: Terrane
- Unit of: North Andes plate
- Sub-units: Subunits
- Underlies: Tahamí & La Guajira terranes
- Overlies: Río Negro–Juruena province

Lithology
- Primary: Complexes, basins
- Other: Volcanoes

Location
- Location: Antioquia, Arauca, Bogotá, Bolívar, Boyacá, Caquetá, Casanare, Cesar, Cundinamarca, Huila, Magdalena, Meta, Putumayo, Norte de Santander, Santander, Tolima departments
- Coordinates: 4°43′22.4″N 74°04′23.7″W
- Region: Andean
- Country: Colombia
- Extent: Central, Eastern, Perijá, SNSM, San Lucas, La Macarena

Type section
- Named for: Chibcha
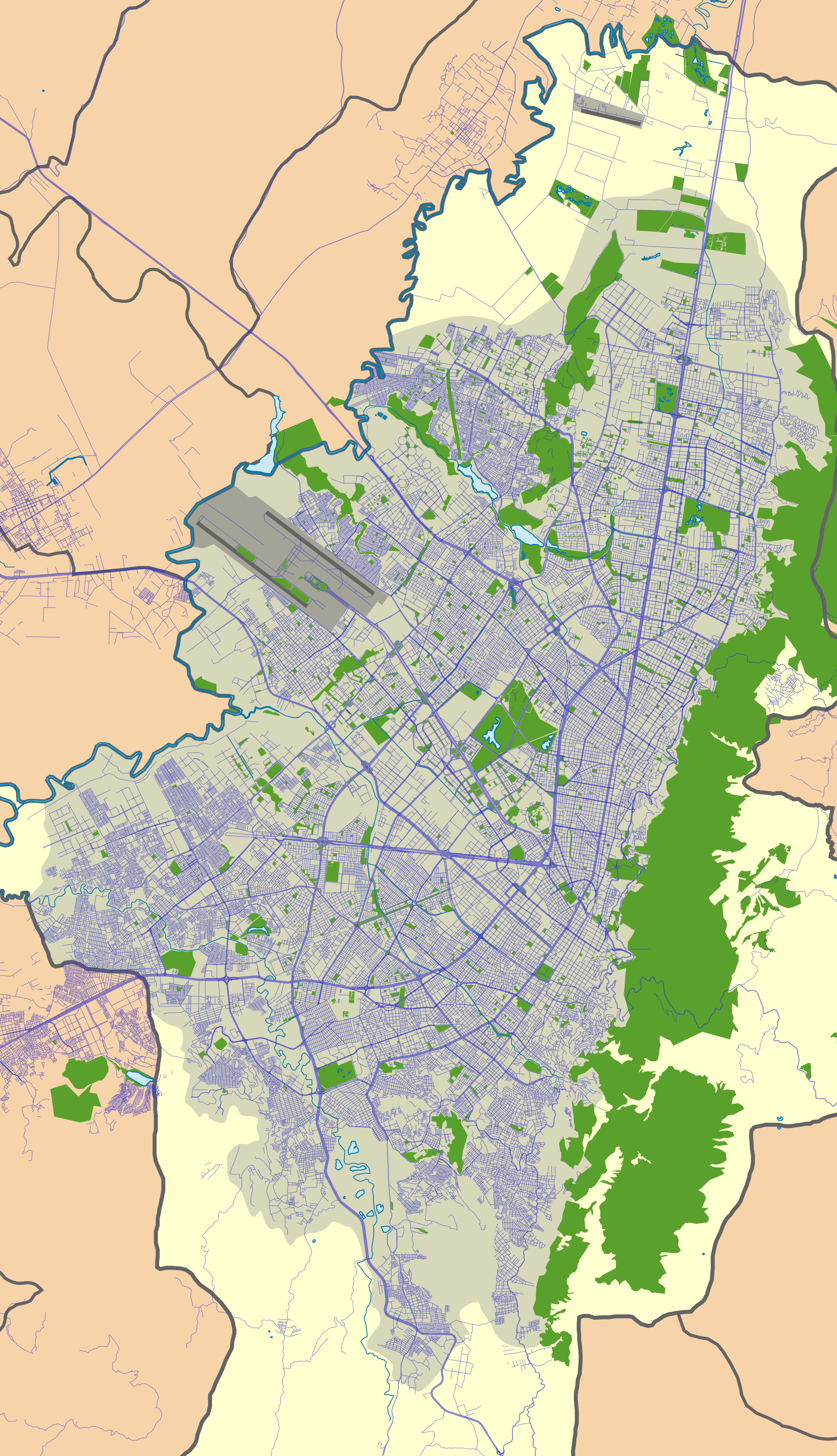
- Chibcha terrane (Colombia) Chibcha terrane (Bogotá)

The Chibcha terrane (Spanish: Terreno Chibcha, TCH), named after Chibcha, is the largest of the geological provinces (terranes) of Colombia. The terrane, the oldest explored domains of which date to the Meso- to Neoproterozoic, is situated on the North Andes Plate. The megaregional Romeral Fault System forms the contact of the terrane with the Tahamí terrane. The contact with the Caribbean and La Guajira terranes is formed by the regional Bucaramanga-Santa Marta Fault. The northeastern boundary is formed by the regional Oca Fault, bounding the La Guajira terrane. The terrane is emplaced over the Río Negro–Juruena province of the Amazonian craton along the megaregional Eastern Frontal Fault System.

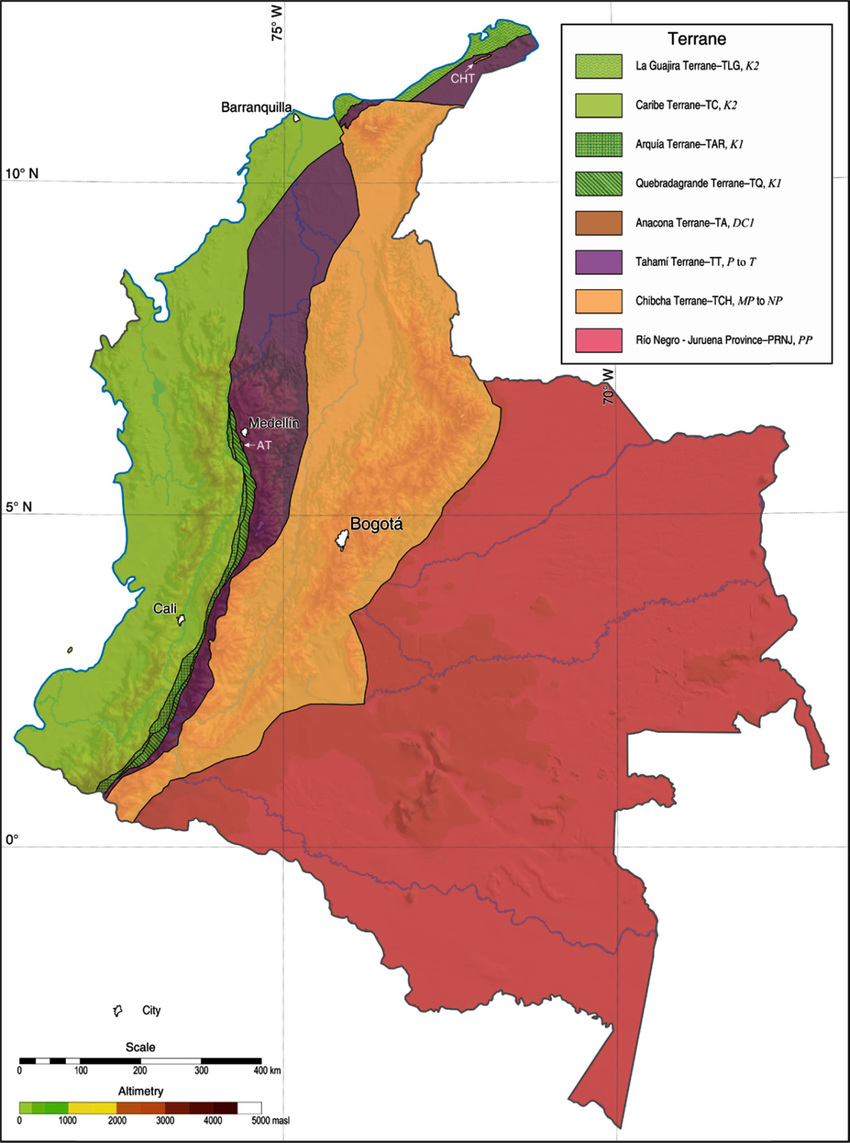
Geological terranes map of Colombia. Terrane abbreviations are in parentheses in the legend, followed by a hyphen and age notation. K1: Early Cretaceous, T: Triassic, P: Permian, D: Devonian, C1: Mississippian, MP: Mesoproterozoic, NP: Neoproterozoic, and PP: Paleoproterozoic.

== Reinterpretation ==
A study performed by Mora Bohórquez et al. in 2017 showed no basement variation between the San Lucas basement underlying the Lower Magdalena Valley (VIM) and the SNSM basement to the east of the Santa Marta Fault. The authors redefined the contacts between the different terranes, using the names Calima terrane for the coastal portion of the Caribbean terrane (San Jacinto and Sinú foldbelts) and Tahamí–Panzenú terrane for the Tahamí terrane.

== Subdivision ==
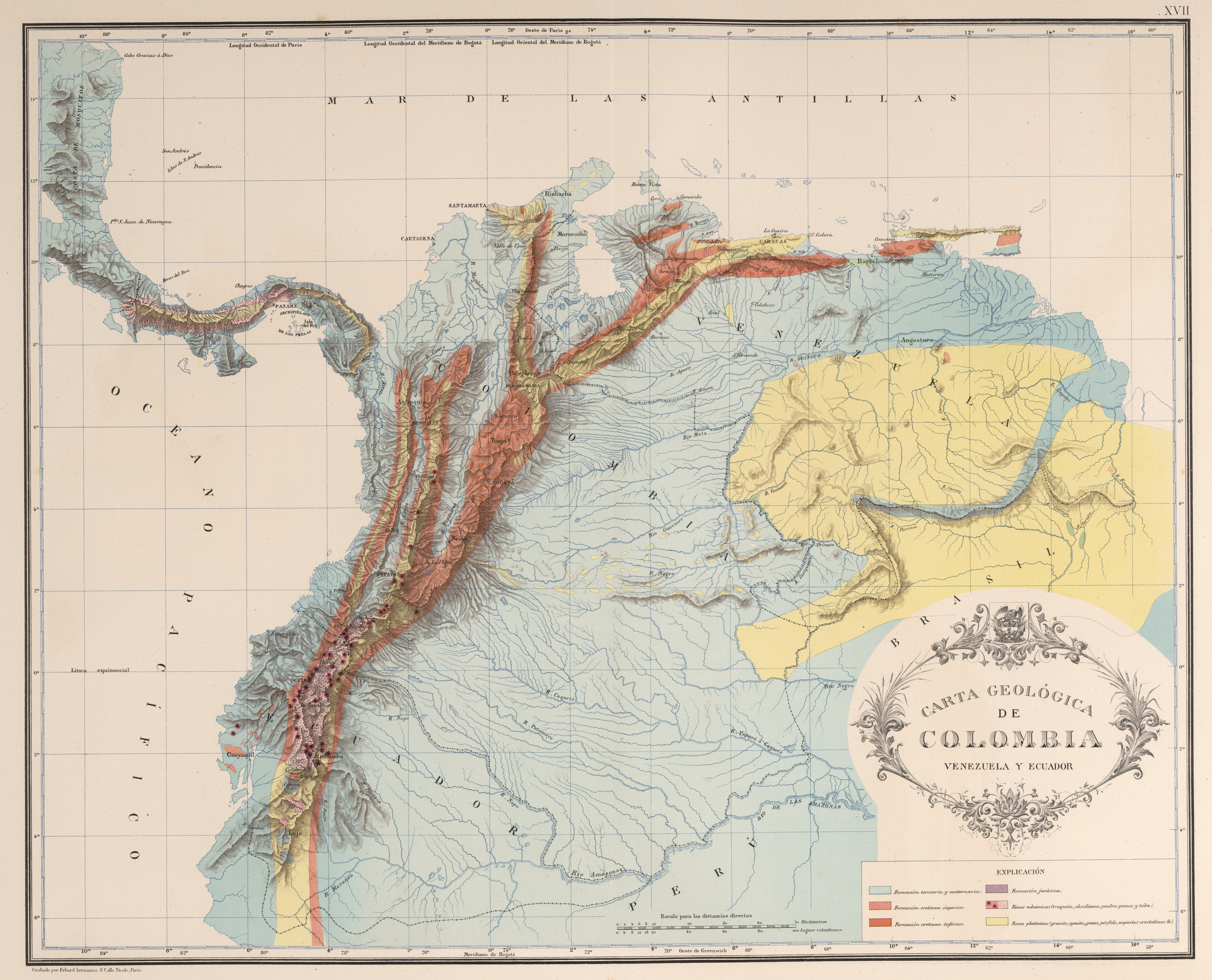
Geologic map of Colombia, Venezuela and Ecuador (Codazzi, 1890)

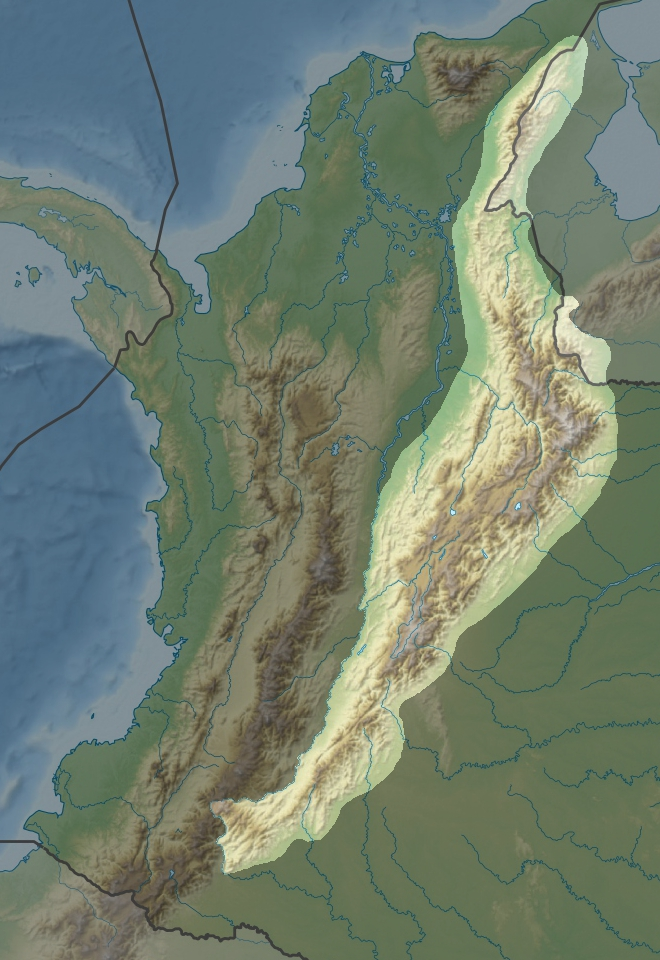
The Chibcha terrane stretches out across the Eastern Ranges, but also includes the Serranía de San Lucas to the west and triangular Sierra Nevada de Santa Marta to the north

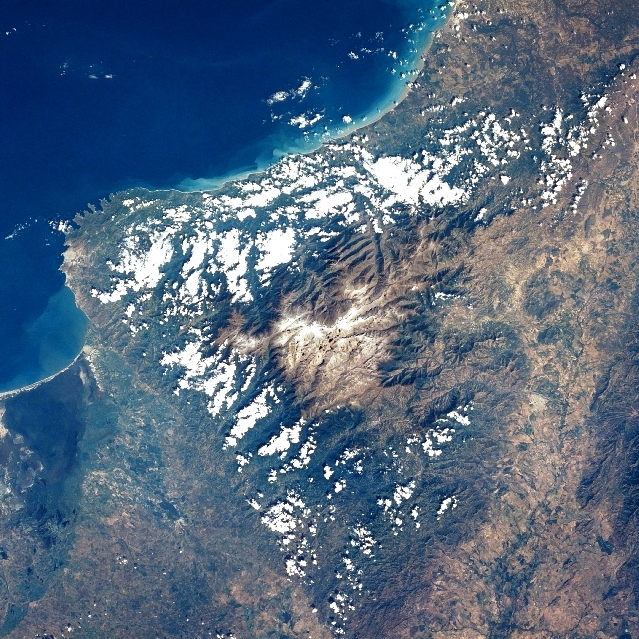
The triangular Sierra Nevada de Santa Marta, east and south of Santa Marta is bound to the west by the Santa Marta Fault (BSF) and to the north by the Oca Fault. The Cesar-Ranchería Basin is visible on the lower right.

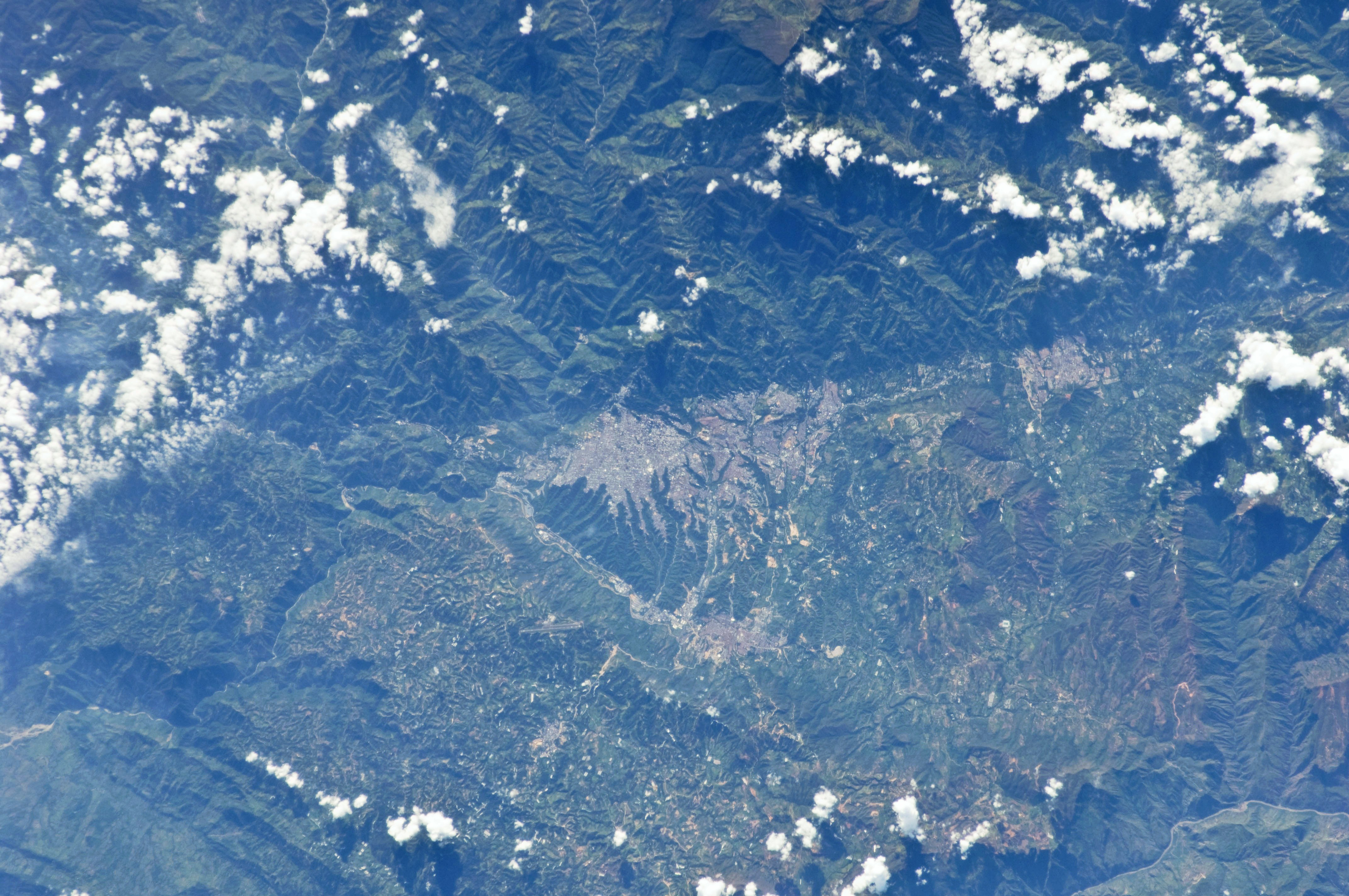
The Bucaramanga Fault east of Bucaramanga and Floridablanca

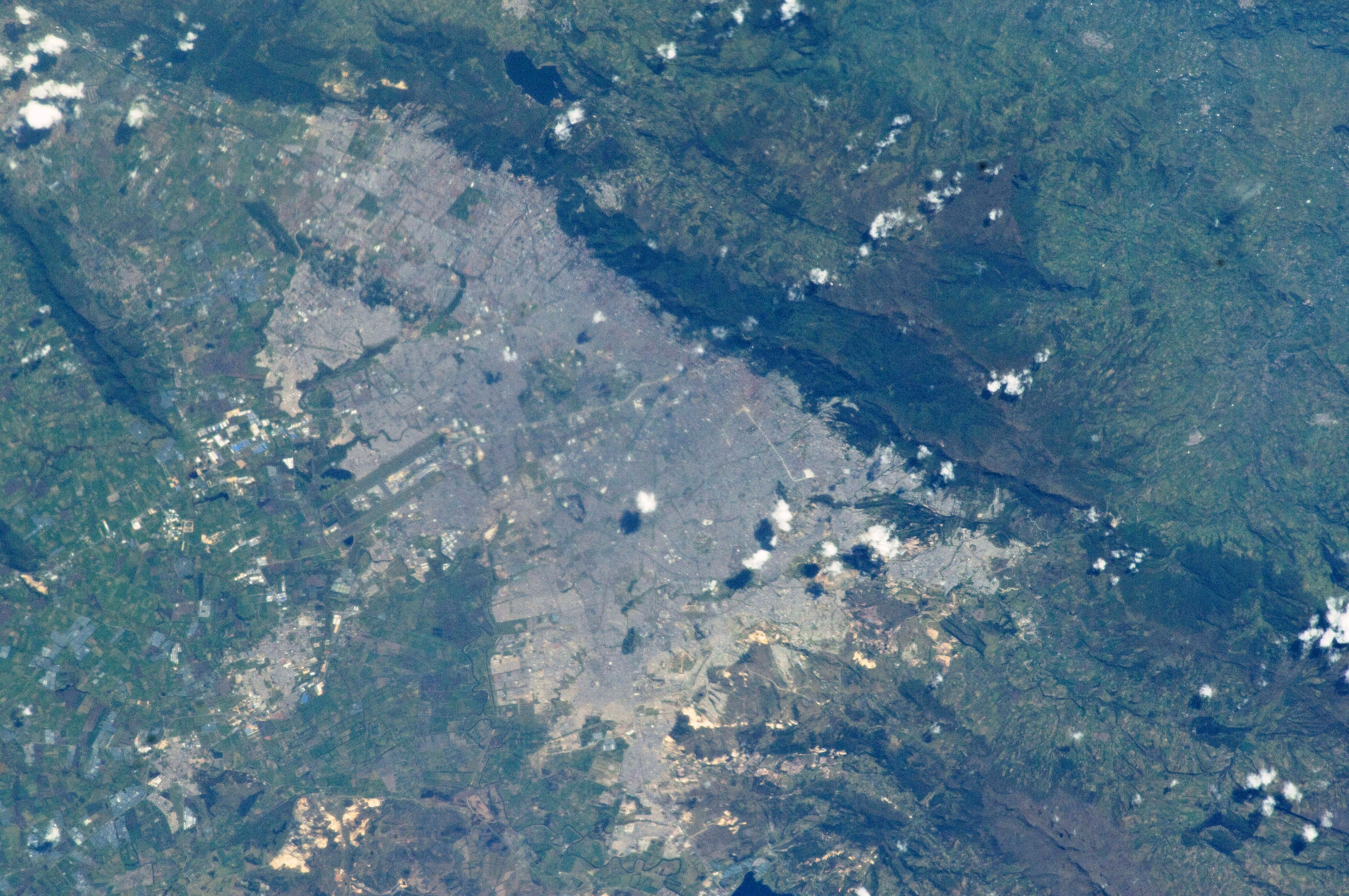
The Bogotá Fault east of Bogotá and Bacatá

Some authors consider the Garzón complex a separate terrane; the Andaquí terrane.

=== Complexes ===
SNSM – Early Eocene

- Santa Marta batholith
- San Lorenzo
- Socorro
- Bolívar
- Aracataca
- Los Clavos
- Central batholith
- Río Sevilla
- Latal
- San Lorenzo
- San Pedro de la Sierra
- Río Oríhueca
- Golero
- Los Tábanos
- Atánquez
- Nueva Lucha
- La Piña
- La Caja de Ahorros
- La Paila
- Buritacá

SNSM Paleozoic

- Los Indios-Corual - Lopingian
- Chundúa - Carboniferous (~Moscovian) to Permian (Guadalupian)
- Los Mangos - basement
- Dibuya - Mesoproterozoic (1000 Ma)

Sierra Nevada de Santa Marta (La Guajira Terrane)

- Tanganga (Taganga)
- Rodadero
- Gaira (Gaira)
- Ciénaga

Perijá

- Palmarito - Cisuralian-Guadalupian
- Manaure - Moscovian-Gzhelian
- Río Cachirí
- La Virgen or Guaca - Silurian (Ludlow)
- Perjiá Series - Neoproterozoic basement

Santander - Neoproterozoic-Ordovician

- Tiburón - Lopingian
- Diamante - Artinskian-Guadalupian
- Río Chitagá - Givetian
- San Pedro (formerly 'Silgará Formation')
- Chicamocha (idem)
- Pescadero
- La Corcova
- Bucamanga - basement

Floresta - Cambro-Ordovician

- Chuscales
- Otengá
- Santa Rosita
- Buntia
- Chuscales phyllite
- Busbanzá
- Neoproterozoic 'Nickerian basement

Quetame

- Farallones - Carboniferous-Devonian
  - Guatiquía - Carboniferous (~Gzhelian) to Permian (Guadalupian)
  - Clarín-Guacavia - Carboniferous (~Moscovian to Kasimovian)
  - Gutiérrez - Eifelian-Givetian
- Puente Quetame, La Balsa - Silurian (Ludlow)
- Quetame Group - Cambro-Ordovician
- Neoproterozoic unnamed basement
- Sombrerillo quartzmonzodiorite
- Sombrerillo Porphyrics
- Altamira
- Mazamorras

La Macarena - Mesoproterozoic

- Ariarí

San Lucas - Cambrian

- La Cocha-Río Tellez
- Norosí
- Bolívar
- Segovia
- Icarco
- La Magdalena
- San Lucas
- Puente Linda
- El Morro
- La Miel
- Norcasía
- El Hatillo

Southwestern Chibcha

- El Bosque
- Santa Isabel
- Samaná Igneous complex
  - Samaná Alaskite
- San Diego
- Padua
- Anchique
- Dolores

==== Andaquí terrane ====
Garzón - Neoproterozoic

- Garzón
  - Garzón granite
  - Garzón Group
  - Florencia migmatite
  - Florencia stock
  - El Recreo
  - El Astillero
  - Las Minas Monzodiorite
  - Las Minas migmatite
  - Ibagué
  - Teruel batholith
  - Teruel quartzmonzodiorite
  - San Cayetano
  - Tierradentro
  - Algeciras
  - Caño Veinte
  - La Plata
  - Guapotón
  - Mariquita
  - Aleluya
  - Cajamarca

=== Volcanoes ===
- Paipa-Iza volcanic complex (Pliocene)
- Nevado del Huila
- Puracé

=== Ranges ===
- Central
- Eastern
  - El Cocuy
  - Cerros Orientales
- Perijá
- Sierra Nevada de Santa Marta
- San Lucas
- La Macarena

=== Basins ===
- Catatumbo
- Cesar-Ranchería
- Eastern Cordillera
  - Altiplano Cundiboyacense
    - Bogotá
    - Chicamocha
- Middle Magdalena (VMM)
- Upper Magdalena (VSM)

=== Faults ===
bounding faults in bold

- **Bucaramanga-Santa Marta (BSF)**
- **Eastern Frontal (EFS)**
  - Afiladores
  - Algeciras
  - Garzón-Pitalito
  - Guaicáramo
  - Guayuriba
  - Mocoa
  - San Pedro-Cumaral
  - Servitá-Santa María
  - Sibundoy
  - Suazá
  - Yopal
  - Boconó
- **Oca**
- **Otú Norte**
- **La Palestina** (LPF)
- **Romeral (RFS)**
- Bagre Norte
- Bituima-La Salina
- Bogotá
- Caño Tomás
- Chitagá-Pamplona
- Cimitarra
- Cucuana
- La Dina
- Honda
- Ibagué
- Irlanda
- La Macarena
- La Plata
- Suárez
- Tarra
- Usme
- Vianí

== Gallery ==
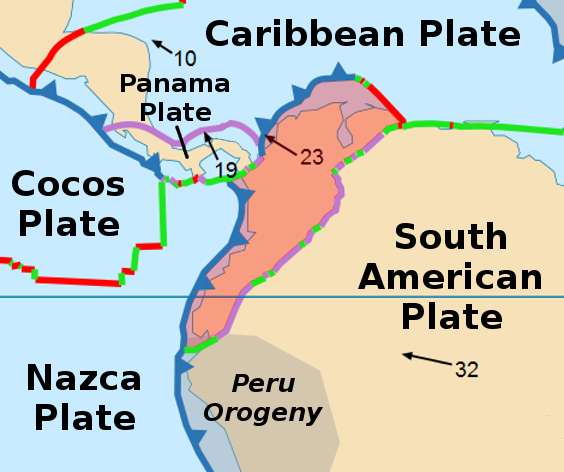
North Andes Plate

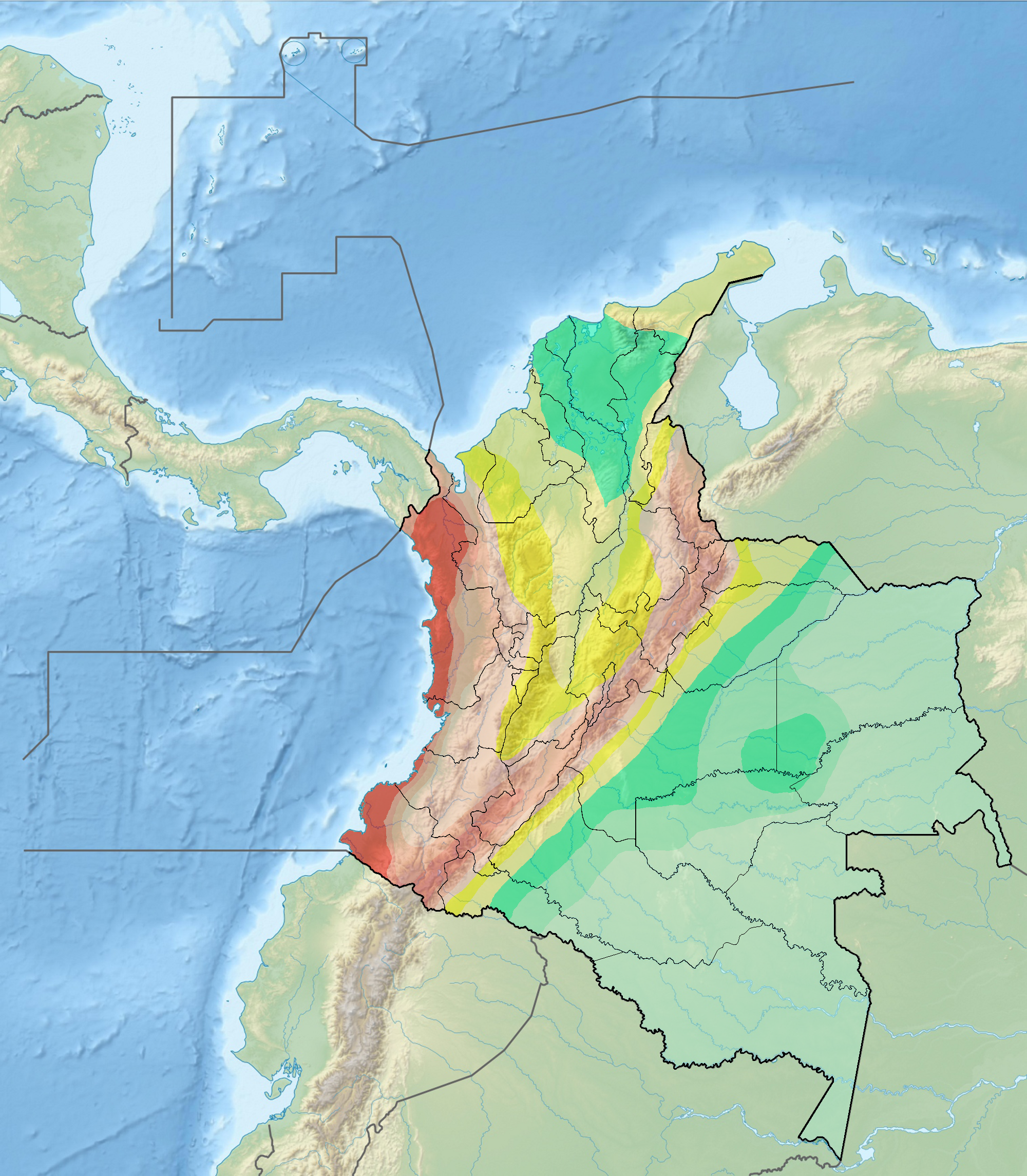
Seismic activity map

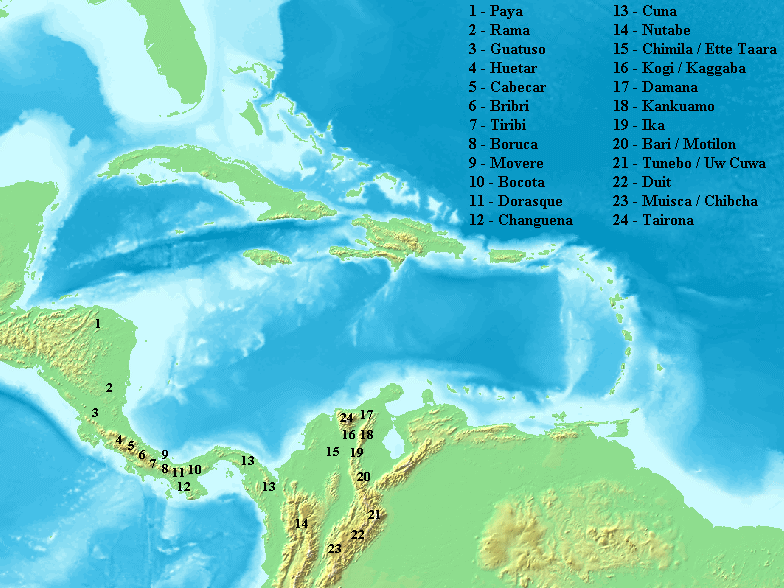
Map of Chibcha-speaking peoples

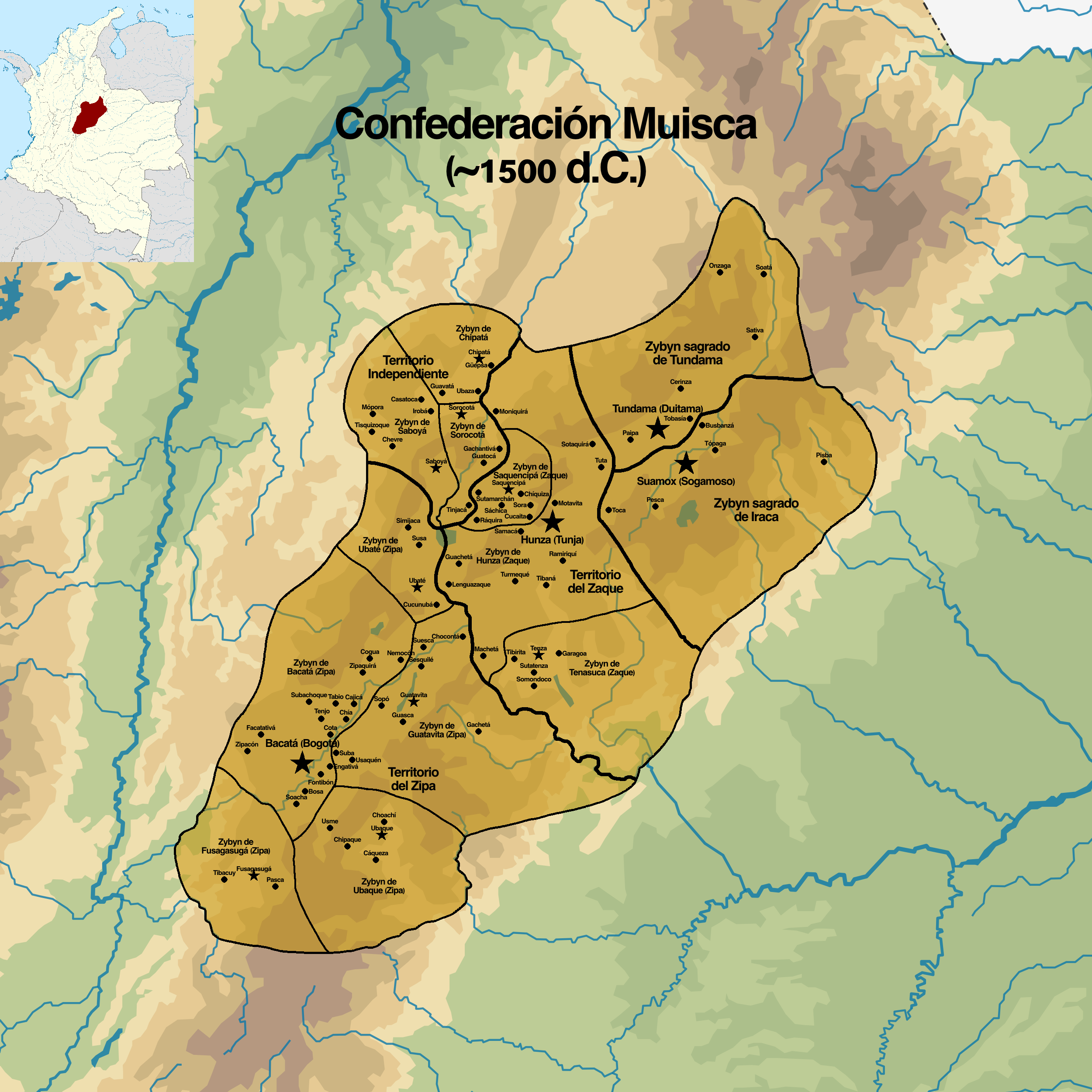
Extent of the Chibcha

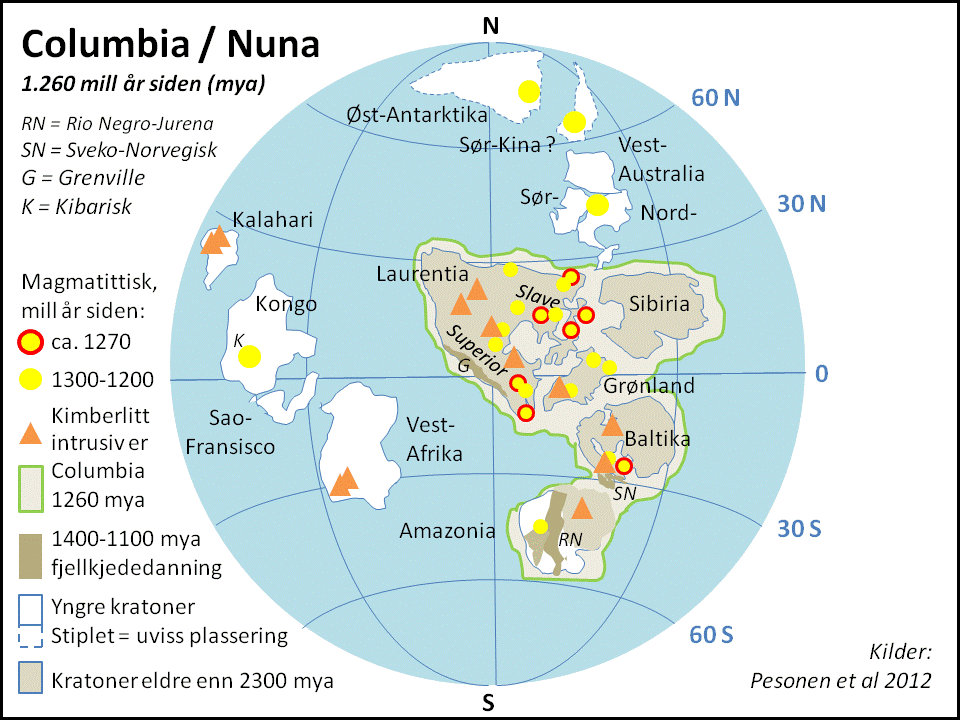
Paleogeography of the Mesoproterozoic

== See also ==
- List of earthquakes in Colombia
- List of fossiliferous stratigraphic units in Colombia
- List of mining areas in Colombia
- Geology of the Eastern Hills of Bogotá
- List of Muisca toponyms
- Cocinetas Basin
