= Mulato-Getudo Fault =

- Mulato-Jetudo Fault, Falla de Mulato-Jetudo
- Location within Colombia
- Etymology: Mulatos & Jetudo Rivers
- Coordinates: 05°20′35″N 74°51′23″W
- Country: Colombia
- Region: Andean
- State: Antioquia, Caldas, Tolima
- Cities: Mariquita

Characteristics
- Range: Central Ranges, Andes
- Part of: Andean oblique faults
- Length: 187.3 km (116.4 mi)
- Strike: 016.7 ± 9
- Dip: West
- Dip angle: High to medium
- Displacement: <0.2 mm (0.0079 in)/yr

Tectonics
- Plate: North Andean
- Status: Inactive
- Type: Oblique thrust fault
- Movement: Reverse sinistral
- Age: Quaternary
- Orogeny: Andean

The Mulato-Getudo or Mulato-Jetudo Fault (Spanish: Falla de Mulato-Jetudo) is a sinistral oblique thrust fault in the departments of Tolima, Caldas and Antioquia in central Colombia. The fault has a total length of 187.3 kilometres (116.4 mi) and runs along an average north-northeast to south-southwest strike of 016.7 ± 9 in the Middle Magdalena Valley and along the western foothills of the Central Ranges of the Colombian Andes.

== Etymology ==
The fault is named after the Mulatos and Jetudo Rivers, left tributaries of the Magdalena River.

== Description ==
The Mulato-Getudo Fault, in some parts called Jetudo Fault, extends along the eastern foothills of the Central Ranges of the Colombian Andes, where it marks the abrupt break in slope of the east-tilted Tertiary erosion surface of the Cordillera and the flat alluvial plains of the Magdalena River in the Middle Magdalena Valley. The fault forms a regional-scale degraded fault escarpment with an outstanding break in slope. It offsets Pliocene to Quaternary deposits and an extensive tilted erosional surface of probable Miocene to Pliocene age (pre-Mesa Formation, older than 1.5 Ma). The northern half of the fault is characterised by aligned drainages and broad valleys. The fault possibly underlies the Honda Group south of the La Miel River.

== See also ==
- List of earthquakes in Colombia
- Cimitarra Fault
- Ibagué Fault
- Romeral Fault System
