= Mulatto (disambiguation) =

Mulatto is a racial classification to refer to people of mixed black African and white European ancestry.

Mulatto may also refer to:

== Arts, entertainment, and media ==
- Mulatto (play), a 1935 American play by Langston Hughes
- Il Mulatto, a 1950 Italian drama film
- Tragic Mulatto, a former American punk rock band
- Le Mulâtre (The Mulatto), an 1837 short story written by Victor Séjour

== Other uses ==
- Mulatto Mountain, a mountain in Ashe County, North Carolina, United States
- Cultural mulatto, a concept introduced by Trey Ellis referring to a black person who is highly educated and a part of the middle or upper-middle class
- Tragic mulatto, a stereotypical fictional character
- Latto (born 1998), American rapper, formerly known by her stage name Mulatto

== See also ==
- Mulato (disambiguation)
