= Cimitarra Fault =

Oblique thrust fault in Colombia

- Falla de Cimitarra
- Location within Colombia
- Etymology: Cimitarra River
- Coordinates: 07°20′12″N 73°55′23″W
- Country: Colombia
- Region: Andean
- State: Antioquia, Bolívar, Santander
- Cities: Cantagallo, Puerto Wilches

Characteristics
- Range: Central Ranges, Andes
- Part of: Andean oblique faults
- Length: 136.5 km (84.8 mi)
- Strike: 323 ± 3
- Dip: unknown
- Dip angle: unknown
- Displacement: 0.1–1 mm (0.0039–0.0394 in)/yr

Tectonics
- Plate: North Andean
- Status: Inactive
- Type: Oblique thrust fault
- Movement: Sinistral reverse
- Age: Quaternary
- Orogeny: Andean

The Cimitarra Fault (Falla de Cimitarra) is a sinistral oblique thrust fault located in the departments of Antioquia, Bolívar, and Santander in central Colombia.

The fault extends for approximately 136.5 km (84.8 mi), trending in a general northeast to southwest direction, with an average strike of 323° ± 3°. It traverses the Middle Magdalena Valley and the Central Ranges of the Colombian Andes.

== Etymology ==
The fault is named after the Cimitarra River, Antioquia, a left tributary of the Magdalena River.

== Description ==
The Cimitarra Fault splays from the Palestina Fault in a northeasterly direction on the eastern border of the Central Ranges of the Colombian Andes, passes north of Barrancabermeja, and possibly connects to the Bucaramanga-Santa Marta Fault in the northeast. The fault displaces Jurassic to Cretaceous volcanic rocks, Mesozoic igneous rocks, a Tertiary erosion surface in the Central Ranges, and late Quaternary sediments. Portions of the fault are pre-Pliocene in age, since it is locally covered by undeformed Pliocene sediments. Farther northeast, the fault is overlain by young alluvial deposits of the Middle Magdalena Valley.

The fault is marked by well preserved fault scarps, long straight traces, displaced drainages, and it forms aligned river courses. The slip rate is calculated at 0.1 to 1 millimetre (0.0039 to 0.0394 in) per year.

== See also ==
- List of earthquakes in Colombia
- El Bagre Fault
- Honda Fault
- Ibagué Fault
- Geology of Colombia
- Romeral Fault System
- Magdalena River
- Andean orogeny
