= Tarra Fault =

- Falla de Tarra
- Location within Colombia
- Etymology: Tarra River
- Named by: Page
- Year defined: 1986
- Coordinates: 08°34′N 73°05′W
- Country: Colombia
- Region: Andean
- State: Norte de Santander

Characteristics
- Range: Eastern Ranges, Andes
- Part of: Andean thrust faults
- Length: 26.8 km (16.7 mi)
- Strike: 007.6 ± 8
- Dip: West
- Dip angle: High
- Displacement: <0.2 mm (0.0079 in)/yr

Tectonics
- Plate: North Andean
- Status: Active
- Type: Thrust fault
- Movement: Reverse
- Age: Quaternary
- Orogeny: Andean

The Tarra Fault (Spanish: Falla de Tarra) is a thrust fault in the department of Norte de Santander in Colombia. The fault has a total length of 26.8 kilometres (16.7 mi) and runs along an average north-northeast to south-southwest strike of 007.6 ± 8 in the Eastern Ranges of the Colombian Andes.

== Etymology ==
The fault is named after the Tarra River.

== Description ==
The Tarra Fault is located northwest of the city of Cúcuta and Las Mercedes Fault. The fault thrusts Precambrian and Paleozoic rocks over Cretaceous rocks. It has a very pronounced morphologic expression along the base of the mountain front through the western side of the Tarra valley. The strong topographic signature of the scarp suggests, according to Page (1986), that the fault is as active as other known Quaternary faults in the region. The fault runs from El Tarra in the north to Hacari in the south.

== See also ==
- List of earthquakes in Colombia
- Bucaramanga-Santa Marta Fault
- Caño Tomás Fault
