= Mulato (disambiguation) =

Mulato is an alternative spelling of "mulatto", an offensive and outdated classification for a person of both African and European ancestry.

Mulato may also refer to:

- Mulato pepper, a type of chili
- Another name for Comecrudo, one of a number of Comecrudan languages

== See also ==
- Mulatos River, in Colombia
- Mulata (film), a Mexican drama
