= Pamplona, Norte de Santander =

Pamplona
- Municipality
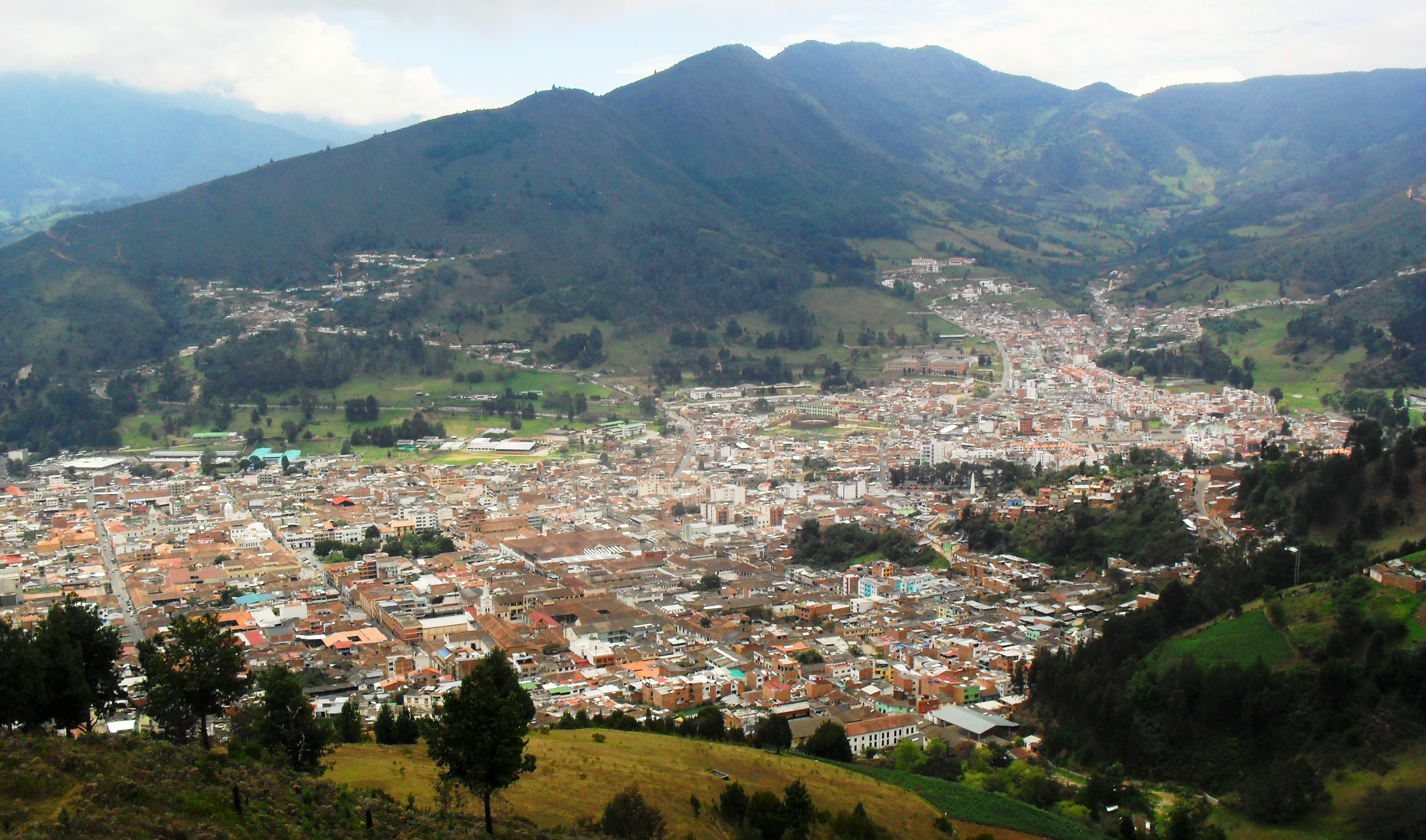
- Pamplona

- Flag Coat of arms
- Nicknames: Student City, Miter City, Holy Spirit Valley
- Location of the municipality and town of Pamplona, Colombia in the Norte de Santander Department of Colombia.

- Location in Colombia
- Coordinates: 07°22′41″N 72°39′09″W
- Country: Colombia
- Department: North of Santander
- Founded: 1549

Government
  - Mayor: Carlos Arturo Bustos Cortés

Area
  - Municipality: 298.3 km^{2} (115.2 sq mi)
  - Urban: 5.27 km^{2} (2.03 sq mi)
- Elevation: 2,342 m (7,684 ft)

Population (2018 census)
  - Municipality: 50,025
  - Density: 167.7/km^{2} (434.3/sq mi)
  - Urban: 46,013
  - Urban density: 8,730/km^{2} (22,600/sq mi)
  - Demonym: Pamplonés
- Time zone: UTC-5 (Colombia Standard Time)
- Area code: 57 + 7
- Website: Official website (in Spanish)

Pamplona (pronounced [pamˈplona]) is a municipality and city in Norte de Santander, Colombia. It is the fifth most populated city and the sixth most populated municipality in the department.

== History ==
=== Colonization ===
The town was founded on 1 November 1549 as Nueva Pamplona del Valle del Espíritu Santo, named after the capital of the Kingdom of Navarre, Crown of Castile, by Pedro de Ursúa and Ortún Velasco de Velázquez. From there, the expeditions departed which founded the towns of Mérida, San Cristóbal and La Grita, in the Republic of Venezuela, and Ocaña, Salazar de las Palmas, Chinácota, San Faustino, Bucaramanga and Cúcuta in Colombia, among others.

The natives, called Chitareros by the Spanish, were the first inhabitants of the old Province of Pamplona. They received the name because of the men had a custom of carrying a calabazo or totumo (gourd) hanging from the waist, with chicha or maize wine as the Spaniards called it. Asked for the name of what they were carrying, the natives responded that it was a chitarero.

When the area was occupied by Pedro de Ursúa and Ortún Velasco in 1549, they reduced the primitive settlers to the regime of encomiendas. Around 100 groups or capitanejos were distributed among 53 encomiendas throughout the territory, according to researcher Jaramillo Uribe.

The town's location allowed it to become an important commercial route between the Viceroyalty of New Granada and the Captaincy of Venezuela; with highly fertile regions and auriferous deposits in the mountains, it became one of the richest territories of the colony, rivaled only by the province of Socorro, which contributed to it being considered a political and administrative axis of the Spanish crown from the time of the conquest.

=== Independence ===
Pamplona earned the nickname of "Patriotic City" as described by Simón Bolivar for having pioneered the New Granadan revolution by proclaiming its independence on 4 July 1810, led by Doña Agueda Gallardo de Villamizar (freedom that was finally declared 31 July of the same year with a provisional assembly), and later, between 1819 and 1821, for having contributed notably with human and economic resources for the liberation of Colombia and Venezuela. Pamplona was as important as Bogotá.

In 1910, with the creation of the Department of Norte de Santander, it was included within its political jurisdiction, becoming part of the province of Pamplona, which is in turn made up of the municipalities of Cácota de Velasco, Cucutilla, Chitagá, Labateca, Mutiscua, Pamplonita, Toledo and Silos. Culturally there are a number of national and international activities making the city a tourist epicenter, including Holy Week, along with the celebrations held in Mompox and Popayán, which are the most important in the country.

The city of Pamplona is in the southwest of the department, along with the municipalities of Pamplonita, Chitagá, Silos, Cácota and Mutiscua. Its historic center stands out in the urban area (declared as a Monument of National Interest according to Decree 264 of 1963), which has long been the main educational center of eastern Colombia and Táchira and Mérida in Venezuela. The solemnity of religious celebrations is also notable – events that attract a large number of people from other parts of the country and Táchira, Venezuela.

== Climate ==
On average, temperature highs range from 18 °C (64 °F) to 19 °C (66 °F) and lows range from 7 °C (45 °F) to 11 °C (52 °F).

Climate data for Pamplona (Iser Pamplona), elevation 2,340 m (7,680 ft), (1981–2010)
Month	Jan	Feb	Mar	Apr	May	Jun	Jul	Aug	Sep	Oct	Nov	Dec	Year
Mean daily maximum °C (°F)	19.0 (66.2)	19.2 (66.6)	19.5 (67.1)	19.5 (67.1)	19.8 (67.6)	19.4 (66.9)	19.2 (66.6)	19.7 (67.5)	20.0 (68.0)	19.7 (67.5)	19.1 (66.4)	18.8 (65.8)	19.4 (66.9)
Daily mean °C (°F)	13.9 (57.0)	14.4 (57.9)	15.0 (59.0)	15.6 (60.1)	15.9 (60.6)	15.7 (60.3)	15.4 (59.7)	15.6 (60.1)	15.7 (60.3)	15.4 (59.7)	14.9 (58.8)	14.3 (57.7)	15.1 (59.2)
Mean daily minimum °C (°F)	7.9 (46.2)	8.8 (47.8)	9.8 (49.6)	11.1 (52.0)	11.6 (52.9)	11.5 (52.7)	11.1 (52.0)	11.0 (51.8)	10.6 (51.1)	10.5 (50.9)	10.1 (50.2)	8.8 (47.8)	10.2 (50.4)
Average precipitation mm (inches)	31.8 (1.25)	36.6 (1.44)	64.4 (2.54)	113.3 (4.46)	106.2 (4.18)	68.9 (2.71)	58.7 (2.31)	68.9 (2.71)	102.7 (4.04)	141.7 (5.58)	95.1 (3.74)	41.6 (1.64)	929.9 (36.61)
Average precipitation days	9	11	13	16	17	17	18	18	18	19	16	10	181
Average relative humidity (%)	79	79	78	79	76	74	73	73	75	78	80	79	77
Mean monthly sunshine hours	161.2	129.9	117.8	99.0	108.5	111.0	127.1	139.5	135.0	124.0	120.0	142.6	1,515.6
Mean daily sunshine hours	5.2	4.6	3.8	3.3	3.5	3.7	4.1	4.5	4.5	4.0	4.0	4.6	4.2
Source: Instituto de Hidrologia Meteorologia y Estudios Ambientales

== Economy ==
One of the main agricultural products of Pamplona is the potato, followed by the production of other vegetables and fruits such as strawberries, garlic, carrots, wheat, morón, beans and corn. During 2014, Pamplona became the municipality that produced the most peas in the department. The main sources of livestock production in the municipality are poultry, cattle and swine. The province of Pamplona is one of the largest food production areas in the department, it also produces dairy products, especially cheese, the main cheeses marketed in the area are Cuajada, in addition to Queso Campesino (lit. 'Farmer's Cheese') and Queso de Hoja (lit. 'Leaf Cheese'). Eighty-five percent of the city's establishments are engaged in commerce.

Pamplona is a student city, hosting the University of Pamplona. That and tourism are probably the main present economic activities, where thousands of students are lodged and fed and are thus the main consumers in nightclubs and cafés.

== Heritage sites ==
=== Churches ===
According to historian Silvano Pabón Villamizar, the construction of religious buildings in Pamplona began at the end of the 16th century and the beginning of the 17th century. The Santa Clara Cathedral was built in 1584 by Magdalena Velazco, the daughter of the founder of Pamplona. The cathedral contains one of the most important musical instruments of Eastern Colombia, a pipe organ created by Celestino Balbiani from Milan, Italy, in addition to a Baroque-style altarpiece. In 1990, architect Jaime Salcedo was awarded the Carlos Arbelaéz Camacho National Restoration Prize for the restoration of the Caterdal at the 12th Biennial of Architecture in Colombia.

One of the most visited places in Pamplona during Holy Week is the Humilladero Sanctuary. It is an example of colonial architecture, featuring a preserved wood carving of Jesus Christ along with Gestas and Dismas. The sanctuary has existed since the foundation of Pamplona.

=== Museums ===
Pamplona houses several museums of the department such as the Águeda Gallardo de Villamizar House, built around 1644 after an earthquake. In the house lived Águeda Gallardo, one of the women who played a role in the independence of Colombia. According to the historians Luis Eduardo Paez Courvel and Luis Febres Cordero, the house was the site for gatherings (Spanish: tertulias) on the process of independence for the country.

== International relations ==
=== Twin towns – sister cities ===
- Pamplona (Navarre), Spain
