= Cucuana Fault =

- Falla Cucuana
- Location within Colombia
- Etymology: Cucuana River
- Coordinates: 04°04′21″N 75°23′19″W
- Country: Colombia
- Region: Andean
- State: Cundinamarca, Tolima

Characteristics
- Range: Central & Eastern Ranges, Andes
- Part of: Andean strike-slip faults
- Length: 141.4 km (87.9 mi)
- Strike: 067.9 ± 6
- Dip: Vertical
- Displacement: 0.01–0.1 mm (0.00039–0.00394 in)/yr

Tectonics
- Plate: North Andean
- Status: Inactive
- Type: Strike-slip fault
- Movement: Dextral
- Age: Quaternary
- Orogeny: Andean

The Cucuana Fault (Spanish: Falla Cucuana) is a dextral strike-slip fault in the departments of Tolima and Cundinamarca in Colombia. The fault has a total length of 141.4 kilometres (87.9 mi) and runs along an average east-northeast to west-southwest strike of 067.9 ± 6 crossing the Middle Magdalena Valley from the Central towards the Eastern Ranges of the Colombian Andes.

== Etymology ==
The fault is named after the Cucuana River.

== Description ==
The Cucuana Fault is parallel to and south of the Ibagué Fault in the Central Ranges of the Colombian Andes, crossing Paleozoic metamorphic rocks, Mesozoic igneous rocks (Ibagué Batholith), and Tertiary beds. The fault extends into the Eastern Ranges across the Middle Magdalena Valley, cutting Cretaceous beds. The Quaternary sedimentary and volcanic fill of the Magdalena River valley is not reported as having been deformed by the fault. This fault has a prominent trace on satellite images. It has displaced drainages, spurs, fault saddles, and formed triangular facets, and appears to structurally control the course of the Cucuana River.

== See also ==
- List of earthquakes in Colombia
- Bucaramanga-Santa Marta Fault
- Romeral Fault System
