= La Macarena Fault =

- Falla de La Macarena
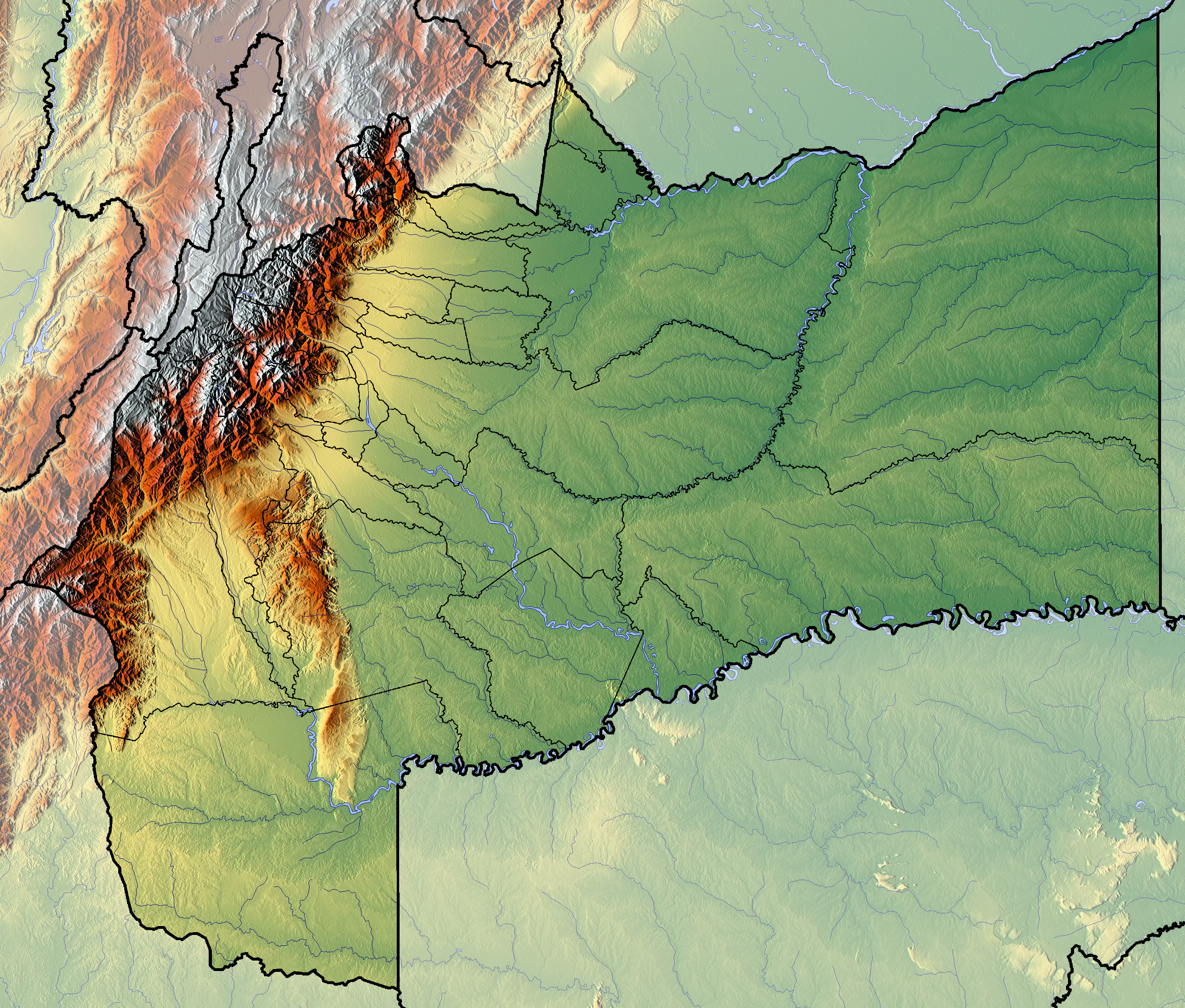
- The fault borders the east side of the Serranía de la Macarena in Meta

- Location within Colombia
- Etymology: Serranía de la Macarena
- Coordinates: 02°31′36″N 73°52′18″W
- Country: Colombia
- Region: Amazon
- State: Meta
- Cities: La Macarena, Vista Hermosa

Characteristics
- Range: Serranía de la Macarena
- Length: 50.3 km (31.3 mi)
- Strike: 000.6 ± 9
- Dip: West
- Dip angle: unknown
- Displacement: <0.2 mm (0.0079 in)/yr

Tectonics
- Plate: South American
- Status: Inactive
- Type: Thrust fault
- Movement: Reverse
- Age: Quaternary
- Orogeny: Andean

The La Macarena Fault (Spanish: Falla de La Macarena) is a thrust fault in the department of Meta in Colombia. The fault has a total length of 50.3 kilometres (31.3 mi) and runs along an average north to south strike of 000.6 ± 9 along the east side of the Serranía de la Macarena.

== Etymology ==
The fault is named after the Serranía de la Macarena.

== Description ==
The Macarena Fault extends along the eastern border of the Serranía de la Macarena, which is an isolated tectonic block to the east of the Eastern Ranges of the Colombian Andes. The fault thrusts Precambrian crystalline rocks and Tertiary oceanic rocks on the west over Tertiary and Pleistocene continental rocks on the east. The course of the Guayabero River is controlled by the fault, showing strong lineations. Pleistocene sediments and alluvial terraces are apparently offset. There is a prominent fault scarp on the west side of the river.

== See also ==
- List of earthquakes in Colombia
- Bucaramanga-Santa Marta Fault
- Eastern Frontal Fault System
