= Honda Fault =

- Falla de Honda
- Location within Colombia
- Etymology: Honda
- Coordinates: 05°22′50″N 74°41′44″W
- Country: Colombia
- Region: Andean
- State: Caldas, Cundinamarca, Tolima
- Cities: Honda

Characteristics
- Range: Middle Magdalena Valley
- Part of: Andean oblique faults
- Length: 187.3 km (116.4 mi)
- Strike: 016.6 ± 12
- Dip: East
- Dip angle: unknown
- Displacement: <1 mm (0.039 in)/yr

Tectonics
- Plate: North Andean
- Status: Inactive
- Type: Oblique-slip fault strike-slip fault
- Movement: Reverse sinistral
- Rock units: Honda Group, Mesa Formation
- Age: Quaternary
- Orogeny: Andean

The Honda Fault (Spanish: Falla de Honda is a reverse sinistral oblique strike-slip fault in the departments of Tolima, Caldas and Cundinamarca in central Colombia. The fault has a total length of 187.3 kilometres (116.4 mi) and runs along an average north-northeast to south-southwest strike of 016.6 ± 12 in the Middle Magdalena Valley.

== Etymology ==
The fault is named after Honda, Tolima.

== Description ==
The Honda Fault extends through the Middle Magdalena Valley, close to the Magdalena River and the cities of Ambalema, Honda, and La Dorada. It offsets beds of the Miocene Honda Group, Pliocene Mesa Formation, and Quaternary sediment in alluvial terraces. The fault trace is characterised by continuous prominent scarps, aligned drainages, fault saddles, linear ridges and valleys, sag ponds, degraded scarps, and localized uplifts. The southern half of the fault has a very low to low slip rate (less than 0.2 millimetres (0.0079 in) per year), while the northern half is low to medium at 0.2 to 1 millimetre (0.0079 to 0.0394 in) per year.

== See also ==
- List of earthquakes in Colombia
- Ibagué Fault
- Romeral Fault System
