= Caño Tomás Fault =

Geologic fault in northern Colombia

- Falla de Caño Tomás
- Location within Colombia
- Etymology: Caño Tomás
- Named by: Page
- Year defined: 1986
- Coordinates: 8°26′N 73°17′W
- Country: Colombia
- Region: Andean
- State: Norte de Santander

Characteristics
- Range: Eastern Ranges, Andes
- Part of: Andean thrust faults
- Length: 81.6 km (50.7 mi)
- Strike: 011.4 ± 8
- Dip: West
- Dip angle: High
- Displacement: <0.2 mm (0.0079 in)/yr

Tectonics
- Plate: North Andean
- Status: Inactive
- Type: Thrust fault
- Movement: Reverse
- Age: Quaternary
- Orogeny: Andean

The Caño Tomás Fault (Falla de Caño Tomás) is a thrust fault located in the Norte de Santander Department of northern Colombia. The fault extends for approximately 81.6 km (50.7 mi), trending in a general north-northeast to south-southwest direction with an average strike of 011.4° ± 8°. It lies within the Eastern Ranges of the Colombian Andes.

== Etymology ==
The fault is named after Caño Tomás a vereda of Teorama.

== Description ==
The fault with a total length of 81.6 kilometres (50.7 mi) is located about 50 kilometres (31 mi) to the west of the town of Tibú, Norte de Santander, along the eastern base of the Eastern Ranges of the Colombian Andes. In the northern part, the fault places agglomerates and breccias of Jurassic to Triassic age against shales and sandstones of Cretaceous age. Farther south, it places Precambrian gneisses and migmatites against Cretaceous and Jurassic to Triassic rocks. The thrust fault, with an approximate strike of 011.4 ± 8 and dipping to the west, displaces the erosion surface of the Eastern Ranges about 1,000 metres (3,300 ft) vertically according to a topographic survey that was done along the fault. This indicates that the fault has been active. However no displacement of Quaternary deposits were observed during aerial and land reconnaissance work by Page (1986). The slip rate has been estimated at less than 0.2 millimetres (0.0079 in) per year.

== See also ==
- List of earthquakes in Colombia
- Bucaramanga-Santa Marta Fault
- Geology of Colombia
- Eastern Frontal Fault System
