= Simone Mountain =

Mountain in North Carolina, United States

Coordinates: 36.34763°N 81.50566°W

Simone Mountain is a summit in Ashe County, North Carolina, in the United States. It has an elevation of 4,304 feet (1,312 m). Simone Mountain is the 574th-highest mountain in the state of North Carolina.

== History ==
Originally known as "Mulatto Mountain", the mountain was renamed Simone Mountain in February 2021. to honor Nina Simone (1933–2003), North Carolina native, soul musician, and civil rights activist. The original name of the mountain is said to be derived from the color of the mountain's soil.

Copper, gold, and silver ores have been found in the mountain.
