= Ibagué Fault =

Seismic fault in Colombia

- Falla de Ibagué
- Location within Colombia
- Etymology: Ibagué
- Coordinates: 04°23′44″N 75°18′18″W
- Country: Colombia
- Region: Andean
- State: Tolima
- Cities: Ibagué

Characteristics
- Range: Central Ranges, Andes
- Part of: Andean strike-slip faults
- Length: 123.9 km (77.0 mi)
- Strike: 067.9 ± 11
- Dip: Vertical
- Displacement: 1–5 mm (0.039–0.197 in)/yr

Tectonics
- Plate: North Andean
- Status: Active
- Earthquakes: Pre-Columbian era (~1040-1280 AD); Possibly 1825 & 1942
- Type: Oblique-slip fault strike-slip fault
- Movement: Reverse dextral
- Rock units: Cajamarca Complex, Gualanday & Honda Groups, Ibagué Batholith & Fan
- Age: Holocene
- Orogeny: Andean

The Ibagué Fault (Spanish: Falla de Ibagué) is a major dextral slightly oblique strike-slip fault in the department of Tolima in central Colombia. The fault has a total length of 123.9 kilometres (77.0 mi) and runs along an average east-northeast to west-southwest strike of 067.9 ± 11 cross-cutting the Central Ranges of the Colombian Andes.

The fault is part of a regional shear zone and has been active in historical times, possibly associated with the 1825 Ibagué earthquake and an earthquake in 1942.

== Etymology ==
The fault is named after Ibagué, the capital of Tolima.

== Description ==
Location of the fault in Tolima

The Ibagué Fault crosses the central part and eastern slope of the Central Ranges of the Colombian Andes, close to the city of Ibagué. The fault strikes west-southwest to east-northeast, controlling the course of the Cocora River. The fault has a well developed fault trace with prominent linear fault ridges (whale backs) as much as 800 metres (2,600 ft) long and 50 metres (160 ft) high, fault scarplets aligned with ridges, sag ponds, fault-controlled drainage, tilted deposits and upwarping. There is about 600 metres (2,000 ft) of (young) displacement along strike as calculated from a "whale back" offset by the fault. The fault, forming a series of ramps, terminates at the Magdalena River, north of Guataquí.

=== Tectonic framework ===
The Ibagué Fault forms part, with the Garrapatas and Cucuana faults, of a shear zone between the latitudes 4 and 5 degrees north. To the north of this zone, regional structures are oriented along a north-northeast strike, characterised by sinistral displacement, among others the San Jerónimo, Silvia–Pijao, Cauca–Almaguer, Murindó, Bituima–La Salina and Bucaramanga–Santa Marta faults. The movement along these structures generates a transpressive tectonic regime, related to the collision of the Chocó Block in the west of Colombia, during the Late Miocene. To the south of the structural zone the Ibagué Fault belongs to, north-northeast striking faults are mostly dextral, such as the Buesaco–Aranda, Cali–Patía, and Algeciras faults. Those are produced by the oblique subduction of the Malpelo plate, formerly considered belonging to the Nazca plate with the continental margin of the South American plate.

The Ibagué Fault cross-cuts the central part of the Central Ranges and extends along a strike of approximately 070 to the east to the Middle Magdalena Valley. Along its trace it principally cuts Paleozoic metamorphic rocks of the Cajamarca Complex, the Jurassic age Ibagué Batholith consisting of granodiorites, tonalites, granites, porphyrics of andesitic and dacitic composition and extrusive rocks as pyroclastic deposits and lava, Paleogene and Neogene sedimentary rocks of the Gualanday and Honda Groups and displacing and deforming the Neogene to Quaternary Ibagué Fan (Spanish: Abanico de Ibagué), which is of volcano-sedimentary origin. The fault passes southeast of the Nevado del Ruiz and Cerro Machín volcanoes.

=== Activity ===
A rate of 1 to 5 millimetres (0.039 to 0.197 in) per year is estimated and 2.5 millimetres (0.098 in) per year published, based on deformed and offset Quaternary features and dated deposits. A calculated moment magnitude of 7.0-7.2 is based on most probable fault rupture length of about 45 kilometres (28 mi), from Ibagué to Piedras. The most recent movement is estimated at 1040 to 1280 AD on the basis of radiocarbon dated deposits. Two epicentres of historical earthquakes are located close to the fault, an earthquake of May 22, 1942 with magnitude 5.8 and an intensity in Ibagué of VIII and the intensity VI 1825 Ibagué earthquake of January 1, 1825.

== See also ==
- List of earthquakes in Colombia
- Romeral Fault System
- Honda Fault
