= Geology of Colombia =

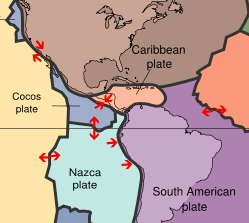
Plate tectonics within Colombia.

Geology of Colombia refers to the geological composition of the Republic of Colombia that determines its geography. Most of the emerged territory of Colombia covers vast areas within the South American Plate, whereas much submerged territory lies within the Caribbean Plate and the Nazca Plate.

== Geologic history ==
As in the rest of South America, a combination of external and internal tectonic, volcanic, and glacial forces over the eons formed Colombia's present-day geology. Island-like outcrops of metamorphic rocks in the eastern Llanos are visible remnants of Precambrian times. During the 289-million-year-long Paleozoic Era, which began 539 million years ago, the ocean invaded the area which is exposed in Colombia's Andean zone, as subterranean volcanic eruptions in the western part of the country spouted lava. In the Triassic Period of the 186-million-year-long Mesozoic Era, which began 252 million years ago, the sea that occupied the Andean zone separated into two parts after the Cordillera Central rose. Large layers of sedimentary rock were deposited during the Jurassic Period, which ended with great igneous activity. During the Cretaceous Period, the sea to the east of the Cordillera Central extended to Putumayo region in the south, while subterranean volcanic activity continued to the west of the Cordillera Central. During the Cenozoic Era, which began about 66 million years ago, the seas withdrew from most of Colombia's territory, and enormous granite masses formed along the Cordillera Occidental. The three cordilleras began to take shape 12 million years ago. The Cordillera Occidental and the Cordillera Central form the western and eastern sides of a massive crystalline arch, which extends from the Caribbean lowlands to the southern border of Ecuador. The Cordillera Oriental, however, is composed of folded stratified rocks overlying a crystalline core.

== Seismic activity ==
Tectonic movement of the cordilleras continues today, as evidenced by frequent seismic activity. Indeed, Colombia remains part of the Pacific Ring of Fire, an active seismic area that surrounds the Pacific basin. The country is located where three lithospheric plates—Nazca, Caribbean, and South American—converge, and their movement produces different types of geologic faults. Almost all of the country's many earthquakes in recent centuries have occurred in the mountainous and coastal regions. Recent major earthquakes include those in Popayán on March 31, 1983, and in the nation's coffee-growing belt on January 25, 1999; and one on March 6, 1987, on the border with Ecuador, measuring 7.0 on the Richter magnitude scale. Recent earthquakes that struck Colombia's Pacific coast areas have included one accompanied by a tsunami in Tumaco, Nariño Department, on December 12, 1979, measuring 7.9 on the Richter magnitude scale, the largest in northwestern South America since 1942; another on November 15, 2004, with a magnitude of 6.7; and one on September 10, 2007, measuring 6.8. Although construction standards are high for new buildings in the main cities, smaller cities and rural zones are particularly vulnerable to earthquakes.

== Emerged and submerged zones ==
Colombia is formed by two great territorial zones, one submerged in the Pacific Ocean and the Caribbean Sea covering a total area of 828,660 km^{2} and the second is the emerged land which is formed by the Andes mountain range and the Llanos plains that are shared with Venezuela and cover an area of some 1'143,748 km^{2}.

=== Emerged zone ===
In the emerged zone the region is washed by numerous rivers that include the Meta, Vichada and the Inirida rivers which contribute to other major rivers like the Orinoco River, Vaupés River, Caquetá River, Putumayo River and Apaporis River. This Llanos region is also divided into three subregions;

==== Northern plains ====
The northern area characterized by its wavy plains similar to a savanna and located between the Andes mountain range and the Guiana Shield formed during the Tertiary mostly covered with sand and clay, while the rivers contributed with sedimentary elements from the Andes during the Quaternary.

==== Macarena Mountains area ====
The second region is located in the central area of the Llanos with a more wavy topography and formations elevated like the Alto del Vaupés or the Serranía de la Macarena mountain range, isolated in the middle of the plains and towards the Guyana Shield.

==== Southern area ====
The southern area is made up by most of the Putumayo and Amazon River basins, while the topography is flatter than the other two regions, this area is covered by dense jungle and makes up most of the Amazon Region of Colombia.

=== The Andean region ===
The Andean Region of Colombia is the other emerged area of the two areas that compose the geology of Colombia. This area originated after a complex geological development that started in the Paleozoic era when the Nazca Plate collapsed with the South American Plate pushing it under the Caribbean Plate that created volcanic islands off the Pacific coast off Colombia and the isthmus of Panama. The Colombian Massif, near the border with Ecuador formed and split into three mountain ranges: Cordillera Central (central mountain range), Cordillera Oriental (Eastern mountain range) and the Cordillera Occidental (Western mountain range), each product of three different formation processes and divided from one another by valleys.

The Cordillera Oriental was the most recently formed mountain range of the three, developing by the end of the Tertiary period and consisting mostly of sedimentary elements. The formation of the Cordillera Oriental covered the continental platform with pelagic sediments with Precambrian and Paleozoic metamorphic rocks bases. The area of the Bogotá Savanna and the highland of Cundinamarca and Boyacá tableland. To the northeast the volcanic metamorphic formed massif in Santander and Norte de Santander formed the Andes in Venezuela and the mountain ranges of Perijá and Motilones, between the border of Colombia and Venezuela during the Pleistocene and added sedimentary rocks during the Mesozoic.

The Cordillera Central formed from the Guyana shield during the Paleozoic era with intrusions from granite and metamorphism. To the west presents basic volcanic rocks from the end of the Cretaceous period and diorite intrusive rocks from the Tertiary. To the west there are metamorphic Paleozoic rocks and two major massifs in Ibagué and the Serranía de San Lucas. Another important formation is the Baudó Mountains to the west of the country.

== See also ==
- Natural Regions of Colombia
- Geography of Colombia
- List of volcanoes in Colombia
