= Sierra Nevada del Cocuy =

National park in the Andes Mountains, Colombia

Parque Natural Sierra Nevada del Cocuy, Chita o Guican
- Sierra Nevada del Cocuy, Chita o Guican National Natural Park
- IUCN category II (national park)
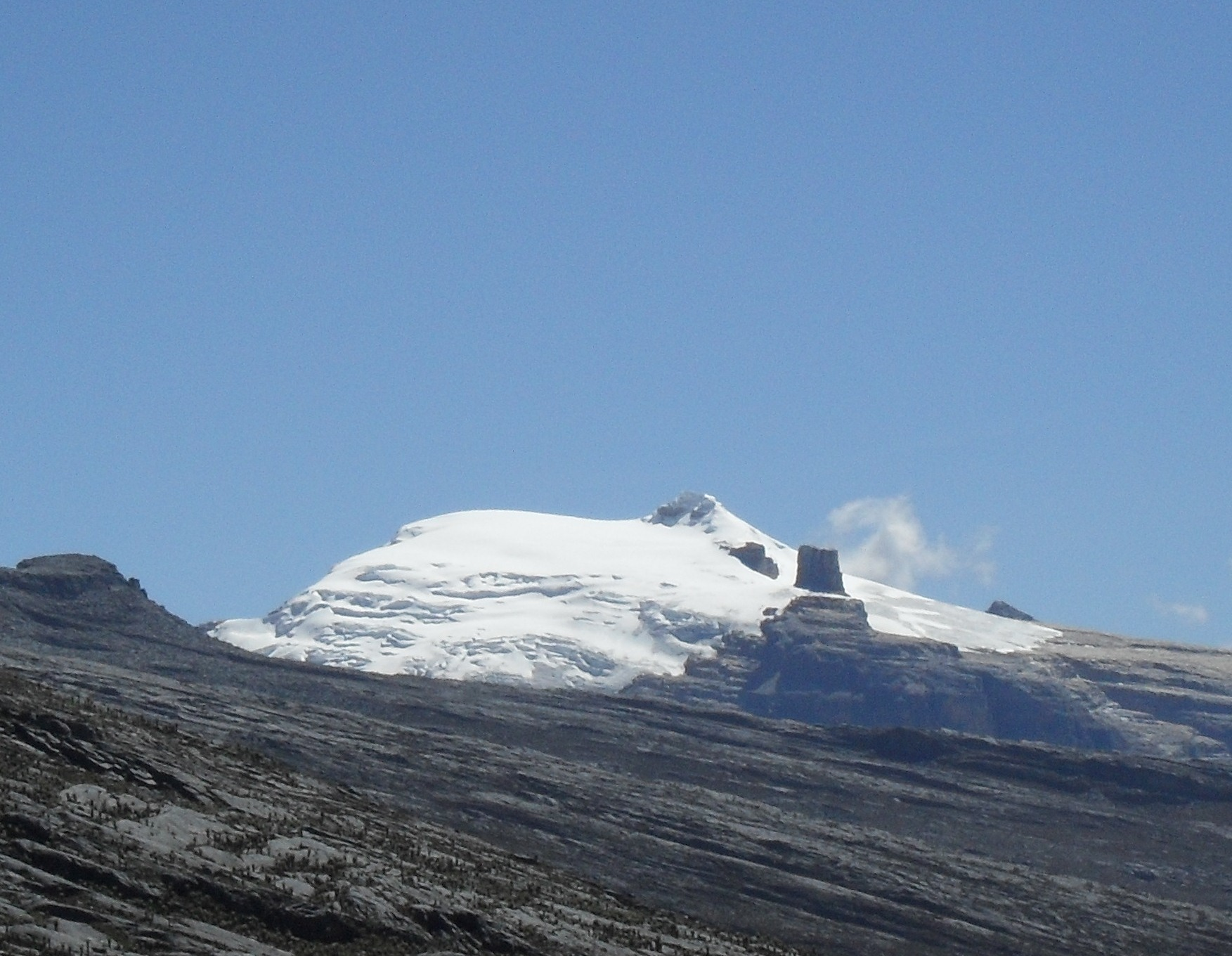
- Pan de Azúcar (5120 m) in the Sierra Nevada del Cocuy

- Location within Colombia
- Location: Departments of Arauca, Boyacá and Casanare
- Nearest city: Tame, Arauca, Colombia
- Coordinates: 06°26′00″N 72°17′00″W
- Area: 3,062 km^{2} (1,182 sq mi)
- Established: 1977
- Governing body: SINAP

The Sierra Nevada del Cocuy Chita or Guican National Natural Park (or Sierra Nevada de Chita or Sierra Nevada de Güicán, Spanish: Parque Natural Sierra Nevada del Cocuy Chita o Guican is a national park and a series of highlands and glaciated peaks located within the Cordillera Oriental mountain range in the Andes Mountains of Colombia, at its easternmost point. It also corresponds to the highest range of the Eastern Cordillera and holds the biggest glacial mass in South America, north of the Equator. Since 1977, this region is protected within a National Natural Park (NNP-Cocuy) because of its fragile páramos, extraordinary bio-diversity and endemism, and its function as a corridor for migratory species under conditions of climate change. Among the Sierra’s natural attractions are the remaining 18 ice-covered peaks (there were as many as 25 in the recent past), glacial lakes and waterfalls.

== Geography ==
The Sierra Nevada del Cocuy lies within the Eastern Cordillera of the Colombian Andes, between the governmental jurisdictions of Boyacá and Arauca. The Parque Nacional Natural el Cocuy (PNN El Cocuy) is the official national park in which the entirety of the glaciated peaks and a portion of regional páramo ecosystems are located. The park has an area of 3000 km^{2}, of which 47% is covered by Páramo ecosystems. The Sierra Nevada del Cocuy is also the largest glacial mass in Colombia, and meltwater from this glacier system feed the rivers Arauca, Casanare and Chicamocha, which in turn drain into the Magdalena and Orinoco basins. Considerable portions of the Colombian and Venezuelan populations utilize the hydrologic resources from these basins for agriculture and sustenance.

=== Peaks ===
The Park contains several high peaks, many with permanent snow cover:

Pan de Azúcar (5120m), Diamante (4800 m), el Púlpito del Diablo (5100 m), Toti (4800 m), Portales (4800 m), Cóncavo (5200 m), Concavito (5100 m), San Pablines South (5180 m) and North (5200 m), Ritacuba Blanco (5330 m), Picacho (5030 m), Puntiagudo (5200 m), Ritacuba Negro (5300 m), el Castillo (5100 m), peak without name (5000 m), Sirara (5200 m).

An 1856 watercolor by Manuel María Paz is an early depiction of the Sierra Nevada del Cocuy in Casanare Province.

== Geology ==
The Sierra Nevada del Cocuy region corresponds to the highest elevations of the Eastern Cordillera of the Colombian Andes. The geologic origins of this mountain range are complex, but have been hypothesized to be the inversion of a Mesozoic extensional basin which gave way to a sedimentary basin that accumulated sediments for millions of years before its closure in the Paleogene. The inversion and resulting shortening and compression values have been estimated to be in the order of 60 ± 20 km. Additionally, it has been proposed that the relatively high topography of the Eastern Cordillera of the Colombian Andes around these areas is due to flat slab subduction of the Nazca plate under the South American plate for ~7.5 Million years .

In general, the geology of the Sierra Nevada del Cocuy consists on sedimentary rocks from the Cretaceous, broadly made up of sequences of quartzites, sandstones and fine-grained mudstones of Aptian and Cenomanian ages. All of these rocks were deposited in marine or coastal environments and have been uplifted ~5 km since their deposition 100-120 Million Years Ago (Ma). Most of this uplift is hypothesized to have taken place relatively recently at the end of the Cenozoic, starting around ~7Ma.

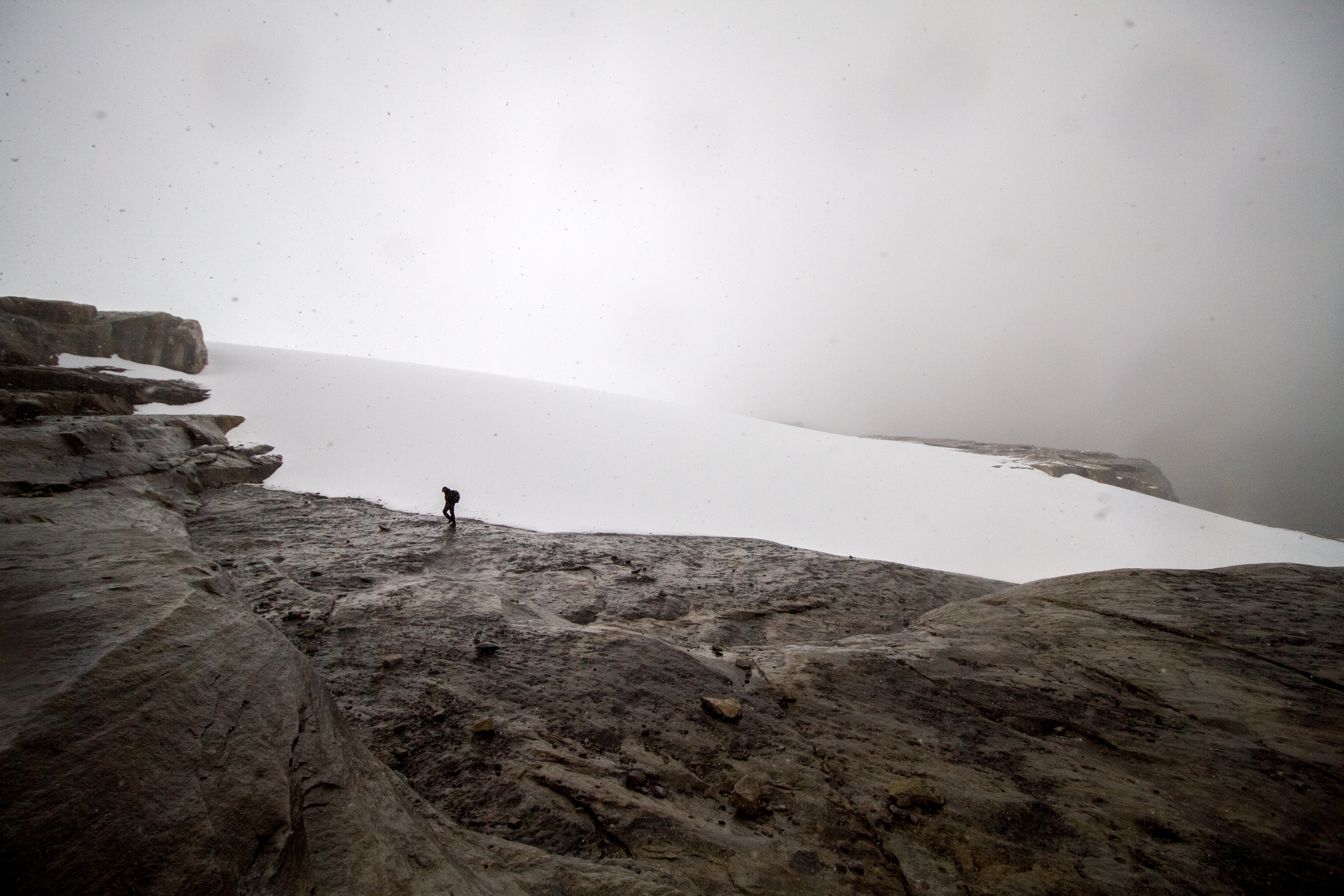
A hiker reaches the glacier atop Ritak U'wa Blanco in Sierra Nevada de Cocuy National Park, part of the Cordillera Oriental of the Colombian Andes.

== Biology and Ecology ==
Most of the area surrounding the glaciated peaks of the Sierra Nevada del Cocuy, and 55% of the entire area of the Parque Nacional Natural el Cocuy is dominated by páramo ecosystems. These are high mountain (3000 – 4800 masl) tundra ecosystems characteristic of the tropical South American Andes and only occur in Costa Rica, Panamá, Colombia, Venezuela, Ecuador and Perú. Páramos are foci of endemic diversity, widely diverse amongst themselves, and are crucial natural water regulation, carbon sequestration and climate change mitigation systems. Because of the “island” effect of páramo distribution on separate mountain ranges, they present a unique flora and fauna derived from evolutionary processes, especially within the last 3 – 5 Ma.

One of the most characteristic plants of the páramo ecosystem, widely spread within the Sierra Nevada del Cocuy, is the yellow-flowered Frailejón (Espeletia lopezii), which dominates the landscapes below the ice line, although many others, belonging to the Compositae, Lamiceae, Poceae and Rosaceae families can be found. Animals, such as tapirs, brown bears, Andean condors, eagles, and páramo deer, and the iconic Spectacled Bear (or Andean Bear) can still be observed.

In spite of their ecological uniqueness, their importance for human sustenance and their inhospitable climatic and geographic conditions, the páramo systems in the Cocuy region have suffered environmental impacts, caused by many different parties. From the pre-hispanic U’wa indigenous groups who first inhabited the region, to the colonial and present-day growing extent of agricultural lands, this landscape has been altered in ways that hinder its ability to store large amounts water and that fundamentally change the delicate biological communities by introducing invasive species or altering land use. Since the colonial period, however, increased social and economic changes have led to the replacement of indigenous agricultural practices in the region with new productive land systems, that further introduced invasive species (~32% of plant species in the Sierra), cattle and sheep, and monocultures. As the climate continues to warm, it is likely that these negative impacts on the páramo soils and hydrological characteristics will continue to progress. It has been demonstrated that unsustainable land use, combined with the effects of climate change affect the natural populations of useful endemic plants (mostly medicinal), especially in the western slope of the Sierra Nevada del Cocuy.

== Geomorphology ==
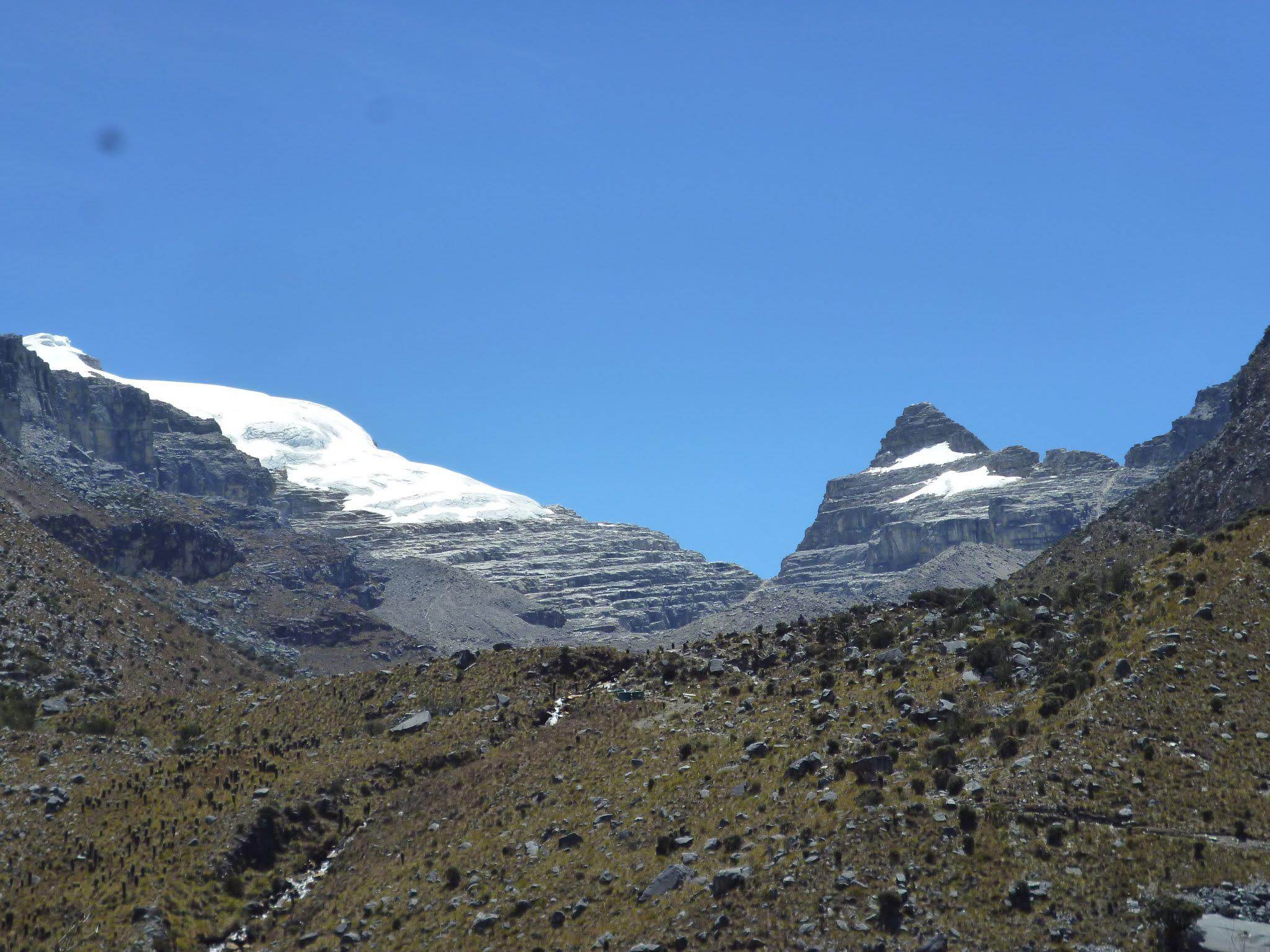
The side of Pan de Azúcar peak (left) and can be seen through a broad valley with sparse páramo vegetation. Glacially deposited boulders can be seen on the foreground and small moraines cab be observed as gray, rocky ridges in the middleground, trending in the same direction as that of the photograph. Colluvium (rock fall) deposits can be observed by the steep rocky faces to the left.

The landscapes in the Sierra Nevada del Cocuy are characterized by glacial landforms that were carved and deposited by the advancing and retreating glaciers throughout the Pleistocene Epoch, such as moraines, cirques and glacial valleys. However, the high tectonic activity and continuous uplift in the region has led to widespread bedrock outcroppings (mostly sedimentary rocks) which give the overall shape and elevation of the area, also characterized by faulting and folding of the Cretaceous rocks. Additionally, fluvial and hillslope processes are considerable influences on the landscape as well. Because of this, preservation of glacial landforms is inversely related to their age and, in turn, directly related to their altitude. For example, the steep walls of the glacial U-shaped valleys are made up mostly of quartzitic sandstones and shales, which leads to fragile slope failure and rock falls. These processes lead to the formation of big and widespread colluviums which cover up, or mix with, preexisting moraines or fluvial deposits. Also, as a tropical glacier system, freezing and thawing cycles in the Cocuy glaciers occur on a day-to-night basis, making seasonality of ice advance and retreat non-existent and geomorphological phenomena less straight-forward, which has been hypothesized to be an explanation for the compact aspect of the moraines. Nevertheless, glacial geomorphological features are pervasive such as terminal and lateral moraines, cirques, U-shaped valleys, proglacial, marginal and supraglacial lakes and ice caps. A geological map from Ingeominas shows the distribution of quaternary (glacial) deposits, colluvium and alluvial deposits, as well as bedrock outcroppings.

== Glacial History and Glacial Retreat ==
The Sierra Nevada del Cocuy has likely been glaciated for the past ~3 Million Years, however, geological studies have only given light to its most recent history. Palynological records from the region, as well as analyses of glacial moraines have indicated high frequency and amplitude climatic variability in the Eastern Colombian Andes region for at least the last 50000 years. It has also been suggested that glacial advances in the Cocuy region preceded maximum global ice volume during the Last Glacial Maximum (~20ka). Furthermore, less prominent ice advances have been recorded for marine Isotope Stages 1, 2 and 3. The glacier reached its maximum extent during the Antarctic cold reversal (~14.5 – 12.9 ka).

More recently, the lowest altitude to have been observed historically occurred around 1850, during the Little Ice Age. Ever since that time, the glacier has been retreating rapidly, at about 1 km^{2} per year. The accelerated retreat has been documented by multiple lines of evidence, including satellite or aerial photograph analysis (), historical records and modern-day measurements. Additionally, the equilibrium line elevation (which is an approximation of the mean elevation of the glacier) has been estimated to have decreased from about 4100masl during the last glacial maximum to 4900 masl in present day.

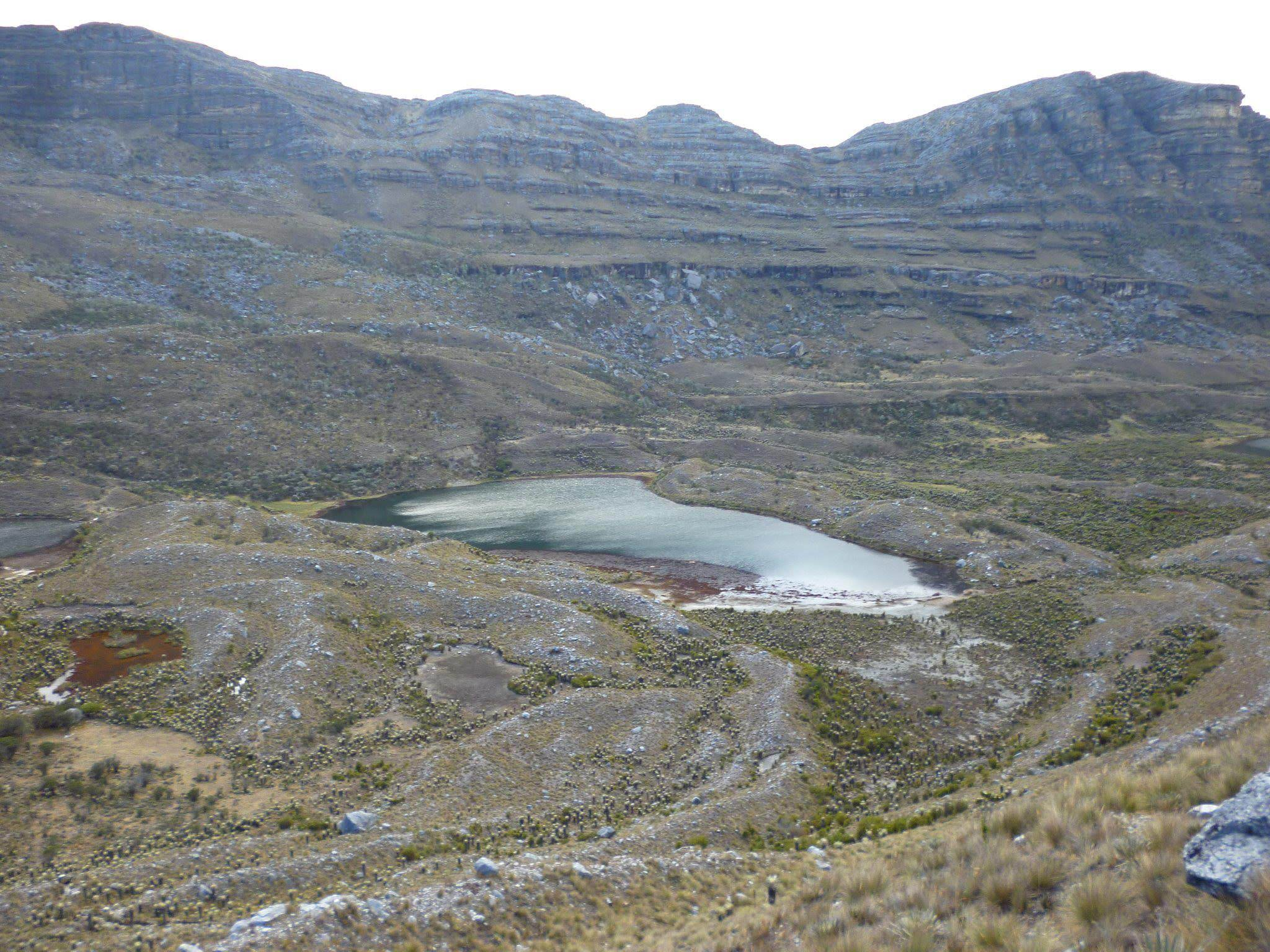
A view of glacial, U-shaped valley with several small recessional moraines and a moraine-dammed lake. The lake's shape is parallel to that of the moraines, indicating its glacial origin. The recessional moraines indicate several events of glacial retreat hiatuses. The rock face in the background shows the Cretaceous - age sedimentary rocks that make up the landscape in the Sierra Nevada del Cocuy area.

With the onset of accelerated warming due to anthropogenic climate change, tropical glaciers such as the ones on the Sierra Nevada del Cocuy are bound to disappear in the next few decades. The Sierra Nevada del Cocuy glaciers, which used to be a single ice body only a few decades ago, had lost an estimated 35-45% of its glacial area in only 15 years (measured in 2006). The entirety of the ice mass from the region has been projected to be completely gone by 2040, although some studies project the disappearance to happen as early as 2025. As climate models become more accurate, it has become clear that these are particularly vulnerable areas to global warming, as the rate of warming of the lower troposphere has been projected to increase with altitude, and be as much as double the temperature increase in areas at or around sea level.

== Native peoples ==
Indigenous natives of the region are the U'wa (Tunebos) and their reservation overlaps the area of the park and thus part of the park is dedicated to their farming, grazing, hunting and fishing activities.

From 1969 to 1977 in the area of the park and the surrounding area, the Colombian government promoted colonisation from elsewhere in Colombia. This resulted in loss of U'wa lands as well as other settlement enclaves within the park.

== Climate ==
Sierra Nevada del Cocuy has a cold alpine tundra climate (ET) with moderate to little rainfall and occasional snowfall year-round. The following climate data is for Alto la Cueva, other places can have higher or lower temperatures with some places covered in snow year-round.

Climate data for Alto la Cueva
Month	Jan	Feb	Mar	Apr	May	Jun	Jul	Aug	Sep	Oct	Nov	Dec	Year
Mean daily maximum °C (°F)	13.2 (55.8)	12.4 (54.3)	12.2 (54.0)	11.4 (52.5)	11.1 (52.0)	11.2 (52.2)	11.2 (52.2)	11.3 (52.3)	11.3 (52.3)	11.2 (52.2)	11.4 (52.5)	12.0 (53.6)	11.7 (53.0)
Daily mean °C (°F)	7.2 (45.0)	6.9 (44.4)	7.0 (44.6)	6.8 (44.2)	6.7 (44.1)	6.7 (44.1)	6.6 (43.9)	6.6 (43.9)	6.6 (43.9)	6.5 (43.7)	6.6 (43.9)	6.9 (44.4)	6.8 (44.2)
Mean daily minimum °C (°F)	−0.5 (31.1)	−0.1 (31.8)	0.8 (33.4)	1.3 (34.3)	1.7 (35.1)	1.7 (35.1)	1.4 (34.5)	1.4 (34.5)	1.4 (34.5)	1.4 (34.5)	1.3 (34.3)	0.6 (33.1)	1.0 (33.9)
Average rainfall mm (inches)	23.4 (0.92)	38.4 (1.51)	64.6 (2.54)	120.7 (4.75)	138.4 (5.45)	98.4 (3.87)	82.5 (3.25)	90.0 (3.54)	103.8 (4.09)	128.1 (5.04)	99.6 (3.92)	53.7 (2.11)	1,041.6 (40.99)
Average rainy days	6	9	11	18	23	21	20	20	20	21	18	13	200
Average relative humidity (%)	84	84	84	85	85	85	86	86	86	86	86	85	85
Mean monthly sunshine hours	220.1	183.5	164.3	108.0	96.1	117.0	145.7	139.5	111.0	105.4	129.0	186.0	1,705.6
Mean daily sunshine hours	7.1	6.5	5.3	3.6	3.1	3.9	4.7	4.5	3.7	3.4	4.3	6.0	4.7
Source: IDEAM

== See also ==
- List of mountains in Colombia
