= Serranía de San Lucas =

Forested mountains in Colombia

Serranía del San Lucas
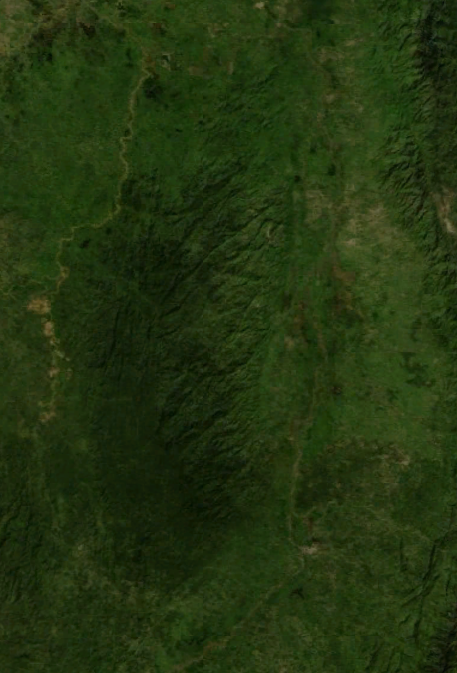

Highest point
- Elevation: 2,700 m (8,900 ft)
- Coordinates: 7°40′00″N 74°12′00″W

Dimensions
- Area: 16,000 km^{2} (6,200 mi^{2})

Geography
- Location within Colombia
- Country: Colombia
- Department: Antioquia and Bolivar

The Serranía de San Lucas is a forested massif in the Bolívar Department of northern Colombia that reaches heights of 2,600 m above sea level. It is part of the Magdalena–Urabá moist forests ecoregion, with a rainforest ecology that includes large monkey and bird populations.

It is a 'forest reserve' that has been recommended for protection, but has been opened to mining by the Colombian government, as the mountains have large deposits of gold, emeralds, nickel and mercury. AngloGold Ashanti has been exploring in the area since 2004, causing tensions with local small-scale miners.

The ELN guerrilla group enforced forest protection in the area in the early 2000s, apparently to protect local hydrology. The area is still subject to fighting between drug cartels, FARC, ELN, the Black Eagles and the Colombian army.
