= Chitagá =

- Municipality and town
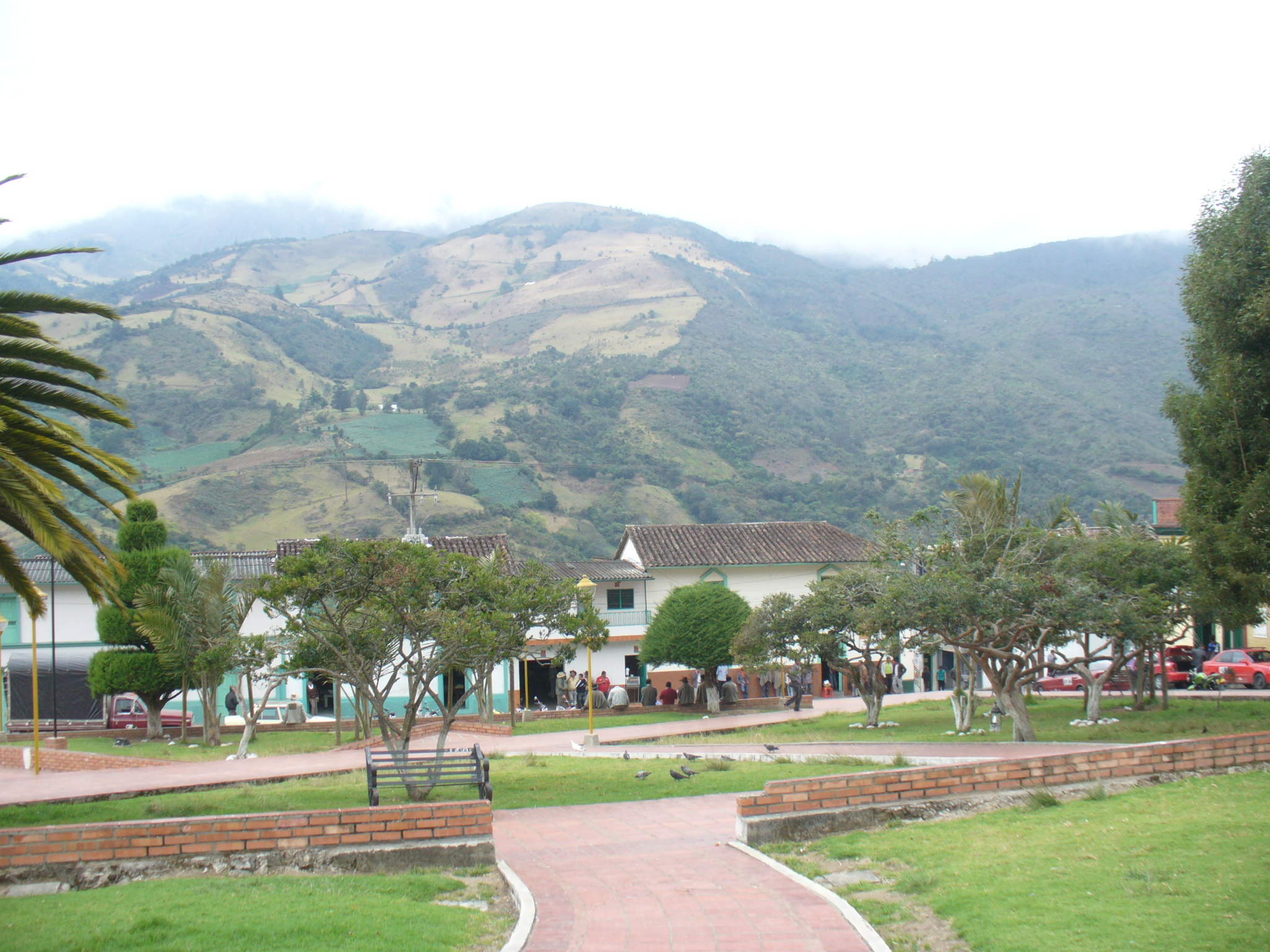
- Chitagá's main square

- Location of the municipality and town of Chitagá in the Norte de Santander Department of Colombia.
- Coordinates: 7°08′16″N 72°39′52″O
- Country: Colombia
- Department: Norte de Santander Department

Area
  - Total: 1,172 km^{2} (453 sq mi)
- Elevation: 2,350 m (7,710 ft)

Population (Census 2018)
  - Total: 10,554
  - Density: 9.005/km^{2} (23.32/sq mi)
- Time zone: UTC-5 (Colombia Standard Time)
- Climate: Cfb

Chitagá (Spanish pronunciation: [tʃitaˈɣa]) is a Colombian municipality and town located in the department of North Santander. The town has a population of 11,684 people and an elevation of 2,350 metres above sea level.
