= Mulatos River =

Location
- Country: Colombia - Urabá Antioquia

Physical characteristics
- Mouth: Caribbean Sea
  - coordinates: 8°38′47″N 76°44′04″W

The Mulatos River is a river of Urabá Antioquia, Colombia. It drains into the Caribbean Sea.

== See also ==
- List of rivers of Colombia
