= Serranía de la Macarena =

Mountain range in Meta, Colombia

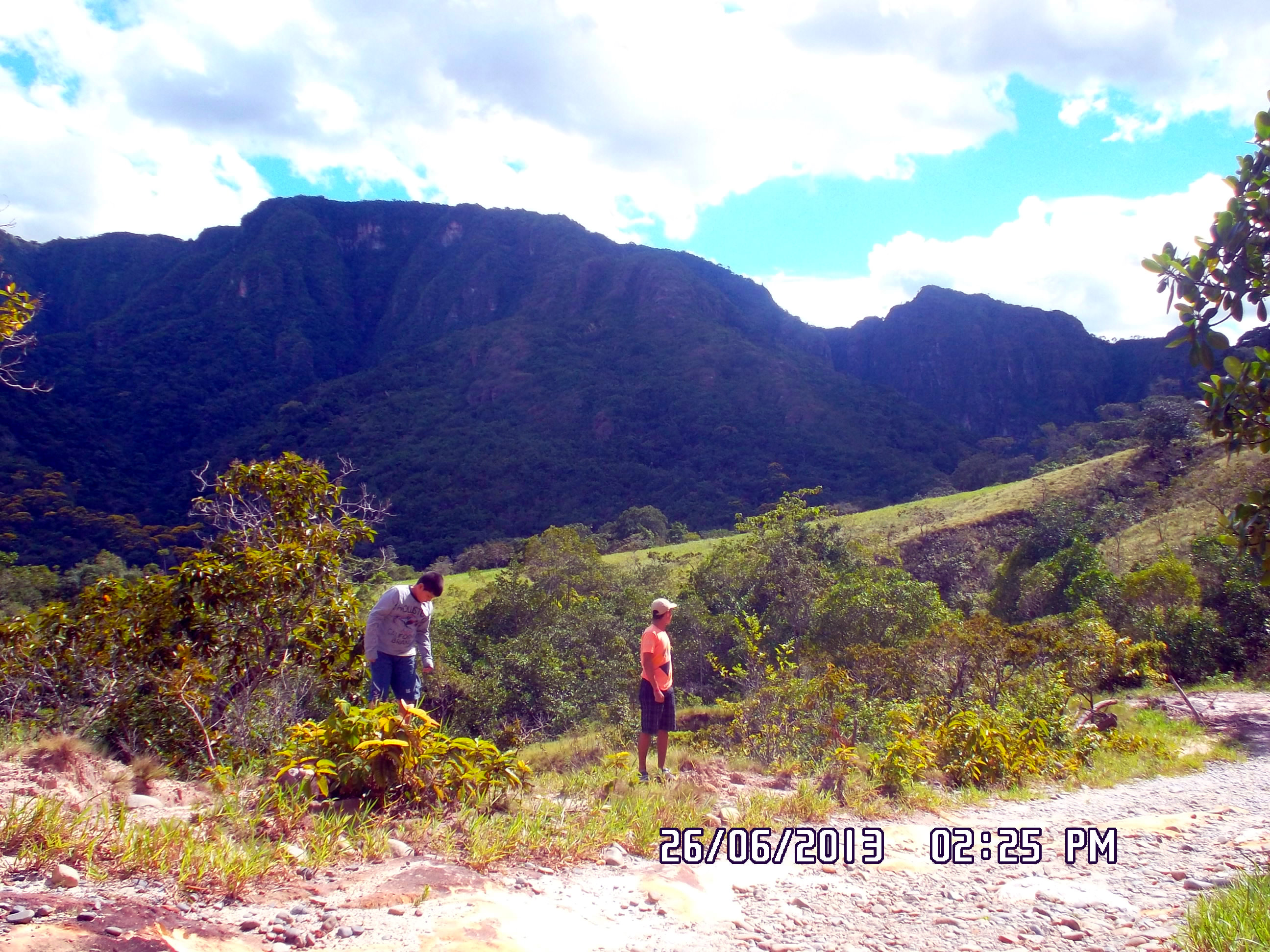

Highest point
- Peak: El Gobernador
- Elevation: 2,615 m (8,579 ft)
- Coordinates: 2°19′55″N 73°53′12″W

Dimensions
- Length: 120 km (75 mi) north-south
- Width: 30 km (19 mi)

Geography
- Location within Colombia
- Country: Colombia
- Region(s): Meta Department, Orinoquía Region

PNN Serranía de la Macarena
- IUCN category II (national park)
- Interactive map of PNN Serranía de la Macarena
- Location: Meta Department, Colombia
- Nearest city: La Macarena
- Area: 6,200 km^{2} (2,400 sq mi)
- Established: 1971

Serranía de la Macarena is an isolated mountain range located in the Meta Department, Colombia. It was named after the Virgin of Hope of Macarena. The mountains are separated by about 40 km (25 mi) at their northern extreme from the East Andes. The range is oriented from north to south and is 120 km (75 mi) in length and 30 km (19 mi) wide. The highest peak ("El Gobernador", the governor) reaches 2,615 m (8,579 ft) and is the highest point of the Orinoquía Region. The first national reserve in Colombia was established in the central part of the mountain range in accordance with a Congressional Law promulgated in 1948. The status of National Natural Park was designated in 1971 and the protected area encompasses 6,200 km^{2} (2,400 sq mi).

== Biodiversity ==
The national park encompasses the ecologically unique meeting point for the flora and fauna of the Amazon, Orinoco and Andes regions. The area is of tropical climate and temperatures range from 42 °F (5.5 °C) to 88 °F (31 °C). These aspects help to maintain a high level of biodiversity with numerous endemic and rare species.

The ecosystems found within the park include rainforest, dry forest, shrublands and savanna. The mountains are home to around 50 known species of orchids, and botanists studying the area have identified more than 2,400 other species of plants. Of those, over 400 can also be found in the Orinoquía subregions. The plants in the Macarena have even less overlap with the 8,000 species in the Amazon subregions.

The ecosystem's fauna includes anteaters, jaguars, cougars, deer, 8 species of monkeys, 500 species of birds including the gray-legged tinamou, 1,200 species of insects and 100 species of reptiles.

== Ecotourism ==
The La Macarena National and Ecological Reserve Park is internationally known for the Caño Cristales, known by people who has visited it as one of the most beautiful rivers in the world.

The park also contains petroglyphs from ancient cultures (Angosturas I and II petroglyphs in the Guayabero River). There are also enormous waterfalls, such as Caño Canoas, El Salto de Yarumales, El Salto del Mico, Soplaculos and others. Most of them are difficult to reach on foot due to the rugged terrain.

Just outside of the city of La Macarena are the Botanical Gardens of La Macarena, a place that offer the possibility of nature tourism involving its visitors in restoration activities.

== Geology ==
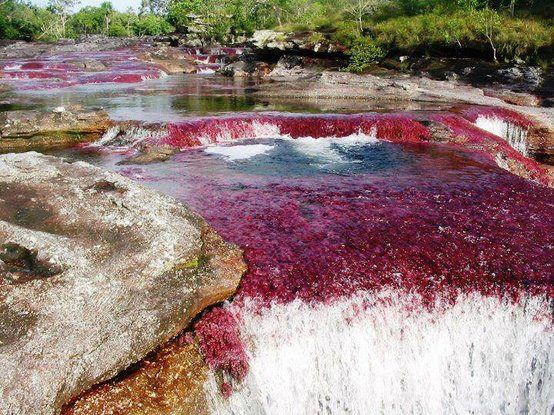
Caño Cristales

Basement rocks on the east side of the Macarenas include the Precambrian granite of the Guyana Shield in the Guaviare River valley and the San Jose del Guaviare area. The rocks of the shield are overlain by sandstones and conglomerates of the Vaupes Formation of Lower Paleozoic to the lower Oligocene age.
