= Middle Magdalena Valley =

Interandean valley in north-central Colombia

- Valle Medio del Magdalena (VMM)
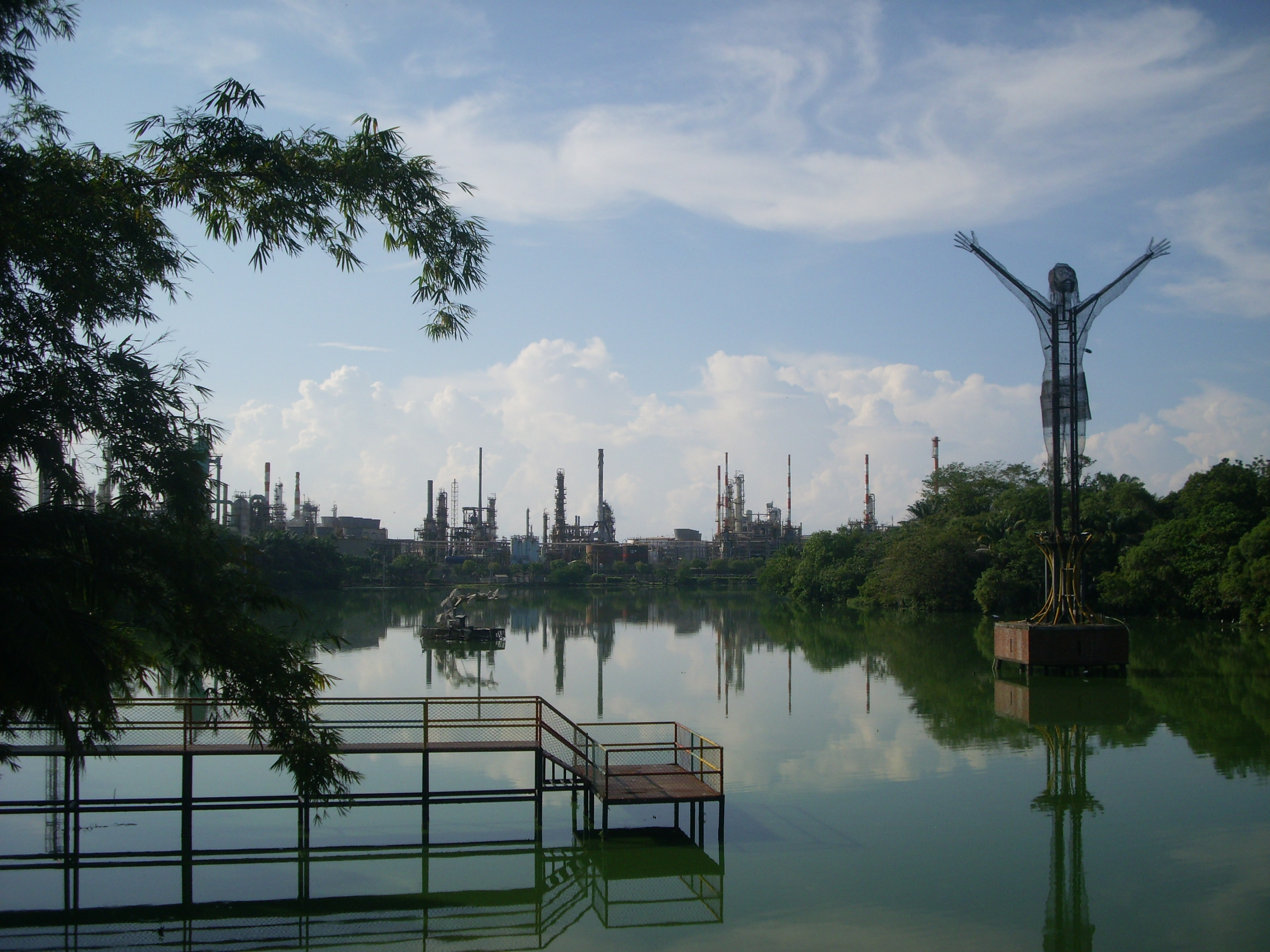
- Petroleum production in Barrancabermeja

- Location of the basin in Colombia
- Coordinates: 7°04′N 73°51′W
- Etymology: Magdalena River
- Region: Andean natural region
- Country: Colombia
- States: Boyacá, Cundinamarca, Santander, Tolima
- Cities: Barrancabermeja

Characteristics
- On/Offshore: Onshore
- Boundaries: Lower Magdalena Valley, Eastern Ranges, Upper Magdalena Valley, Central Ranges
- Part of: Andean foreland basins
- Area: 34,000 km^{2} (13,000 sq mi)

Hydrology
- River: Magdalena

Geology
- Basin type: Intermontane foreland basin
- Orogeny: Andean
- Age: Jurassic-Holocene
- Stratigraphy: Stratigraphy
- Faults: Cantagallo, Infantas, La Salina
- Fields: La Cira-Infantas, Casabe, Yariguí-Cantagallo, Velásquez

The Middle Magdalena Valley, Middle Magdalena Basin or Middle Magdalena Valley Basin (Spanish: Valle Medio del Magdalena, commonly abbreviated to VMM) is an intermontane basin, located in north-central Colombia between the Central and Eastern Ranges of the Andes. The basin, covering an area of 34,000 square kilometres (13,000 sq mi), is situated in the departments of Santander, Boyacá, Cundinamarca and Tolima.

The basin is structurally bounded by the Palestina Fault to the west and the Bucaramanga Fault to the east. The Middle Magdalena Valley hosts the middle course of the Magdalena River, the main river of Colombia, flowing from the Upper Magdalena Valley in the south to the Lower Magdalena Valley to the northwest. The basin is elongated with an approximate width of 80 km (50 mi) and extends to the north for approximately 450 km (280 mi), where it terminates against the Santander Massif and Cesar Valley. To the south, it terminates against the Upper Magdalena Valley, which consists of the Girardot and Neiva Sub-basins where the Central and Eastern Ranges converge.

The basin is an important producer of oil in Colombia, with main fields Yariguí-Cantagallo, Moriche, Casabe, La Cira-Infantas, Velásquez, Santos, Palagua, Teca, Payoa and Lisama. The first three fields were among the twenty most producing fields of Colombia in 2016. Until 2008, La Cira-Infantas and Casabe produced more than 730 million barrels (116×10^{6} m^{3}) and 289 million barrels (45.9×10^{6} m^{3}) respectively. Main producing reservoirs are the Colorado, Mugrosa, Esmeraldas and La Paz Formations. Secondary reservoirs are Lisama and La Luna.

== Etymology ==
The name of the basin is taken from the middle course of the Magdalena River.

== Basin development ==
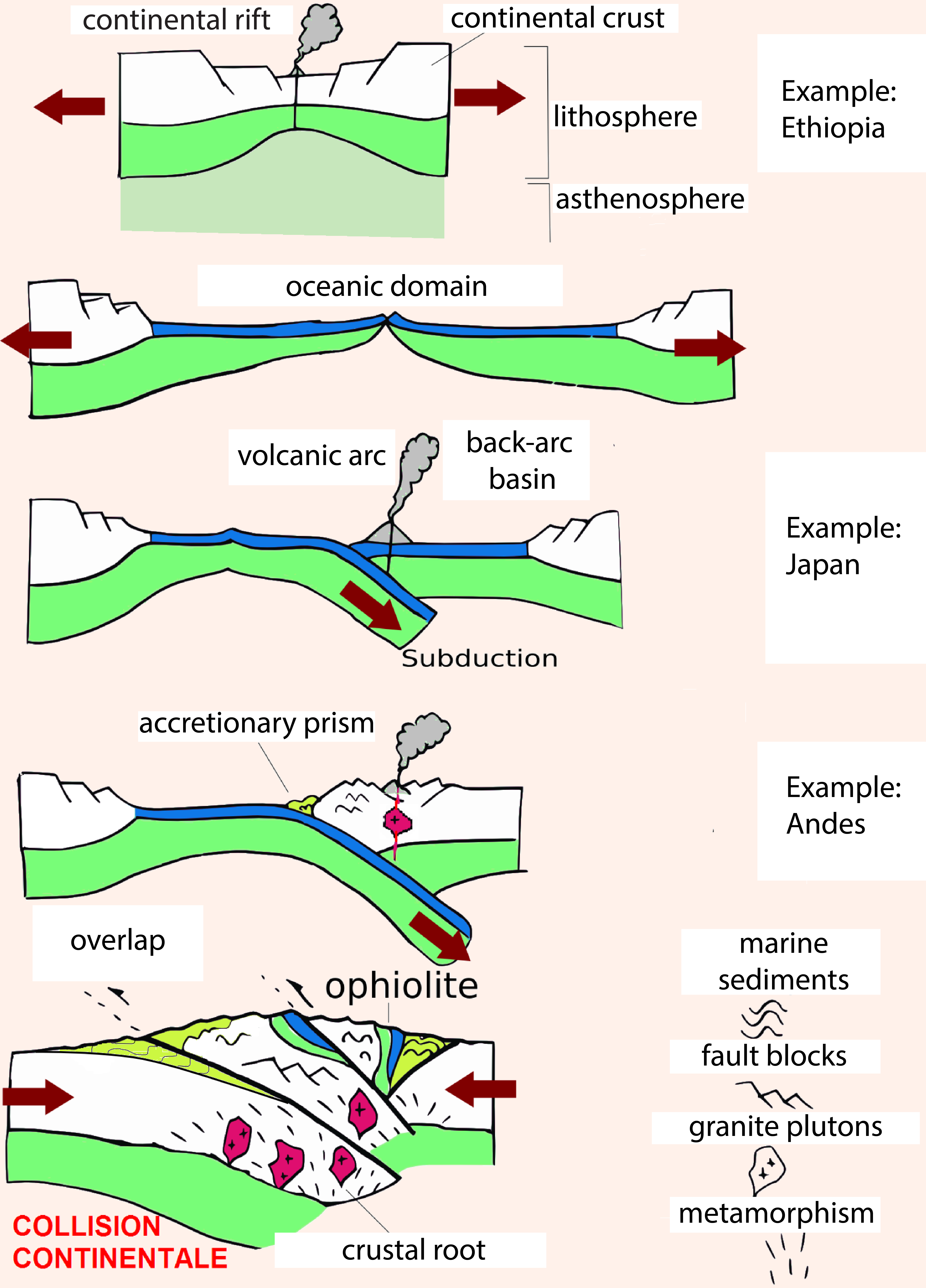
Orogenic cycle of rifting, subduction, and accretion

During the Jurassic period, Pangea began to pull apart causing separation of North America from South America. This rifting produced a subduction zone where the Nazca Plate was subducting to the east under the South American Plate. Part of this subducting plate was the Baudo-Island Arc separated from the South American continent by the marginal Colombian Sea. The formation of the extensional back-arc basin associated with this subduction is the origin of the Middle Magdalena Basin in the late Jurassic. Throughout the Cretaceous, the basin experienced thermal subsidence and five transgressive-regressive cycles as part of a marine megacycle.

In the Paleocene, the rate of subduction increased causing the marginal Colombian Sea to close and the Baudo-Island Arc to collide with the South American continent. This caused accretion of the Western Ranges and uplift of the Central Ranges transforming the back-arc basin into the pre-Andean foreland basin. Around the time of the Oligocene, the Nazca Plate increased its subduction to the east while the South American Plate experienced a westward pull. This caused the Andean orogeny in the Miocene and uplift of the Eastern Ranges in the Pliocene. Now the Middle Magdalena basin is an intermontane basin situated between the uplifted Central and Eastern Ranges.

== Geologic structures ==
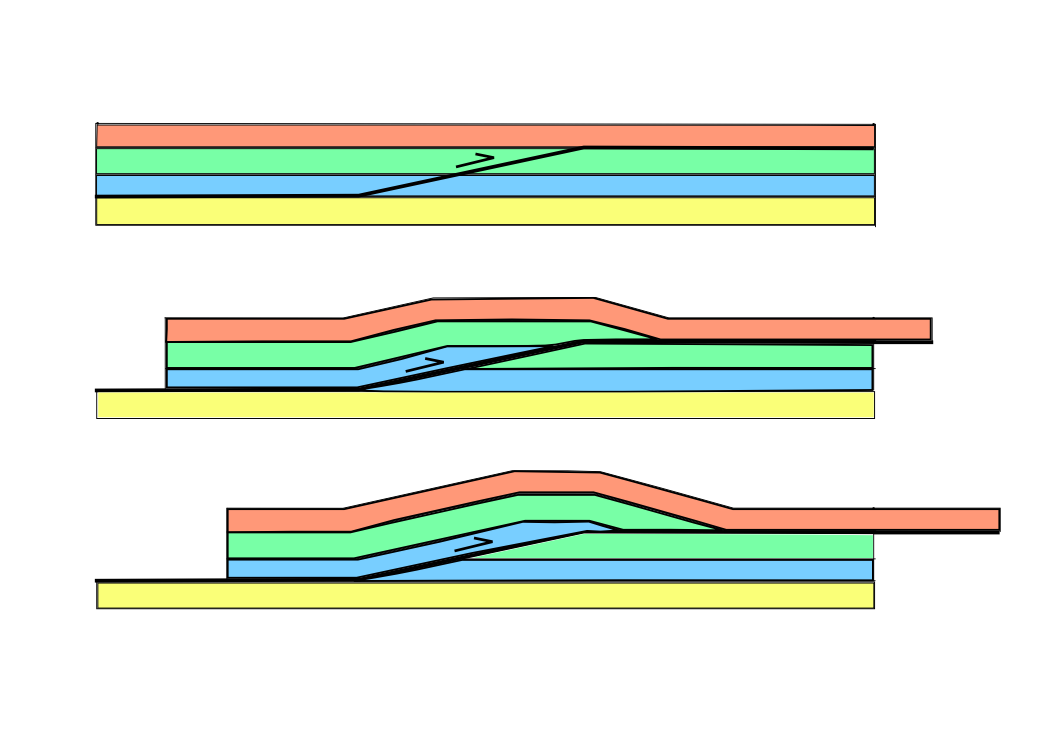
Schematic illustration of folds produced by thrust faults

Faulting in the Middle Magdalena Basin is primarily reverse and thrust faulting. Reverse faulting is high angle in the west and low angle in the eastern and central areas of the basin with normal faults also developing along the eastern margin. These thrust faults formed from thrusting from the eastern margin of the Central Ranges in the Eocene and the western margin of the Eastern Ranges in the Miocene. The major thrust faults in the Middle Magdalena Basin include the Infantas Thrust, La Salina Thrust, and Cantagallo Thrust. The basin is structurally bounded by the Palestina Fault, a dextral strike-slip fault system, in the west and the Bucaramanga-Santa Marta Fault, a sinistral strike-slip system, in the east.

The major surface structures of the Middle Magdalena Basin are asymmetric synclines and basement cored anticlines, which formed as a result of thrusting from the Eastern and Central Ranges. The thrusting initiated faulting in the Pre-Mesozoic basement. The faults then pushed through the Jurassic layers to the Cretaceous ductile stratigraphy. The faults then form horizontally at the ductile-brittle transition for 10 to 20 kilometres (6.2 to 12.4 mi) before cutting through the upper brittle stratigraphy. The resulting structure is a syncline against the hanging wall of the fault next to an inclined anticline. Key folds in the basin for hydrocarbon exploration include the Nuevo Mundo and Guaduas Synclines. As suggested by the formation of the folds, both of these synclines are bounded by thrust faulting and anticlines.

== Stratigraphy ==
Tectonic and stratigraphic timeline of the Middle Magdalena Basin, Colombia.

The stratigraphy of the Middle Magdalena Basin can be divided into three sequences separated by angular unconformities. The basement of these sequences is Pre-Mesozoic metaclastics and sediments which are now exposed on the surface of the Central Cordillera as a result of its deformation and uplift. This geologic basement is at most 15 kilometres (9.3 mi) deep, with faulted sections shifted up to approximately 10 kilometres (6.2 mi) in depth. The unconformity that separates the basement from the first sequences indicates the approximate time rifting began.

=== First sequence ===
The first sequence was deposited in the Jurassic during the rifting which caused the initial formation of the basin. This Jurassic formation is called the Girón Formation which consists of siltstones and rhyolitic tuffs. During this period, the basin also experienced granitic plutonism along its western margins. The Jurassic-Cretaceous angular unconformity, separating the first and second sequence, is representative of the post-rift boundary.

=== Second sequence ===
The middle sequence represents the formations deposited throughout the Cretaceous and Early Paleocene. The oldest formations in this sequence are the Tambor and Los Santos Formations. The conglomerates and sandstones indicate a continental to fluvial depositional environment. In the Early Cretaceous, sea level began to rise and formed a shallow marine environment with siltstone and shale deposits of the Cumbre Formation. Sea level continued to rise throughout the Middle Cretaceous when the Tablazo and Salto limestones and Simití shales were deposited. The La Luna Formation represents a maximum flooding surface with deep marine deposits of limestone, chert, and shale. Sea level then began to fall, returning the environment to shallow marine with deposition of the Umir Formation of shales and sandstones. Finally, the Paleocene saw the deposition of the Lisama Formation, consisting of deltaic mudstones and sandstones. This entire middle sequence indicates a marine megacycle consisting of five transgressive-regressive cycles. The angular unconformity between the second and third sequences is a result of erosion from the accretion of the Western Ranges.

=== Third sequence ===
The final sequence represents deposition from the Early Tertiary to present day. Within this sequence, there are three subsequences that are the result of deformation and uplift of the Central and Eastern Ranges. The first subsequence consists of the Chorro Group with the La Paz and Esmeraldas Formations and the Chuspas Group with the Mugrosa and Colorado Formations, all deposited during the Eocene to Oligocene. These groups consist of fluvial sandstones, mudstones, siltstones, and shales, and are a result of erosion in the Central Ranges. The second subsequence is the Miocene Real Group, consisting of fluvial sandstones and conglomerates. Similar to the Real Group, the final subsequence is the Pliocene Mesa Formation, which is composed of sandstones and conglomerates deposited due to the Eastern Ranges uplift. The uppermost sedimentary rocks of the basin are Pleistocene alluvial fan deposits, overlain by Holocene sediments of the Magdalena River.

== Petroleum resources ==
The primary reservoirs in the Middle Magdalena Basin are fluvial sandstones and conglomerates from the Churro and Chuspas Groups, which have 20 to 25% porosity and 0.5 to 1 D permeability. The main source of hydrocarbons is the La Luna limestone, with a Total Organic Carbon (TOC) content of 3 to 4% and Type II marine kerogen, sealed by overlying Eocene shales. There are three types of traps that house hydrocarbons in the Middle Magdalena Basin. The two structural traps are large anticlines in the center of the basin and smaller anticlines along the western margin. Both of these anticlinal traps produce from Tertiary sandstones within the Churro and Chuspas Groups. The third trap is stratigraphical with the La Luna limestone sealed by overlying shales.

=== Primary fields ===
Largest producing fields of the Middle Magdalena Valley, Colombia
Field name	Producing formations	Lithologies	Structure
La Cira-Infantas	Colorado Fm., Mugrosa, La Paz	Sandstone, conglomerate, shale	Dome bounded by Infantas Thrust
Casabe	Colorado Fm., Mugrosa Fm., La Paz Fm.	Claystone, sandstone	Fault bounded
Yariguí-Cantagallo	La Paz Fm., Esmeraldas Fm.	Sandstone, claystone, shale	Fault bounded
Velásquez	Tune, Avechucos	Claystone, siltstone, sandstone	Bounded by normal faults

The table above shows some of the largest producing fields. Included is their producing formation, the lithologies of the formations, and the structure of the fields containing the hydrocarbons. The Tune and Avechucos Formations are equivalent to the Chorro and Chuspas Groups. Both the Casabe and Yariguí-Cantagallo Fields are located on the Magdalena River towards the western margin of the basin with the Yariguí-Cantagallo Field located approximately 40 kilometres (25 mi) north of the Casabe Field. Approximately 30 kilometres (19 mi) east of the Casabe Field is the oldest and largest La Cira-Infantas Field, situated towards the central to eastern margin of the basin. The Velásquez Field is located at the southern end of the basin near the Upper Magdalena Valley.

Current exploration is focused in the southern area of the basin, where heavy amounts of faulting could house potential hydrocarbons. Aside from the La Luna limestone, other potential source rocks include Early Cretaceous sediments such as the Paja and Simití Formations, or the Late Cretaceous shales of the Umir Formation.

== Gallery ==
VMM, major in South America

Pipelines in Colombia

Alto Magdalena pipeline

Caño Limón-Coveñas pipeline

Colombia pipeline

Ocensa pipeline
Barrancabermeja

Barrancabermeja

Santander

La Dorada

Puerto Boyacá

Puerto Triunfo

Pulí

== See also ==
- Geology of Colombia
- Cesar-Ranchería Basin
