= 2025 Cundinamarca earthquake =

Earthquake in central Colombia

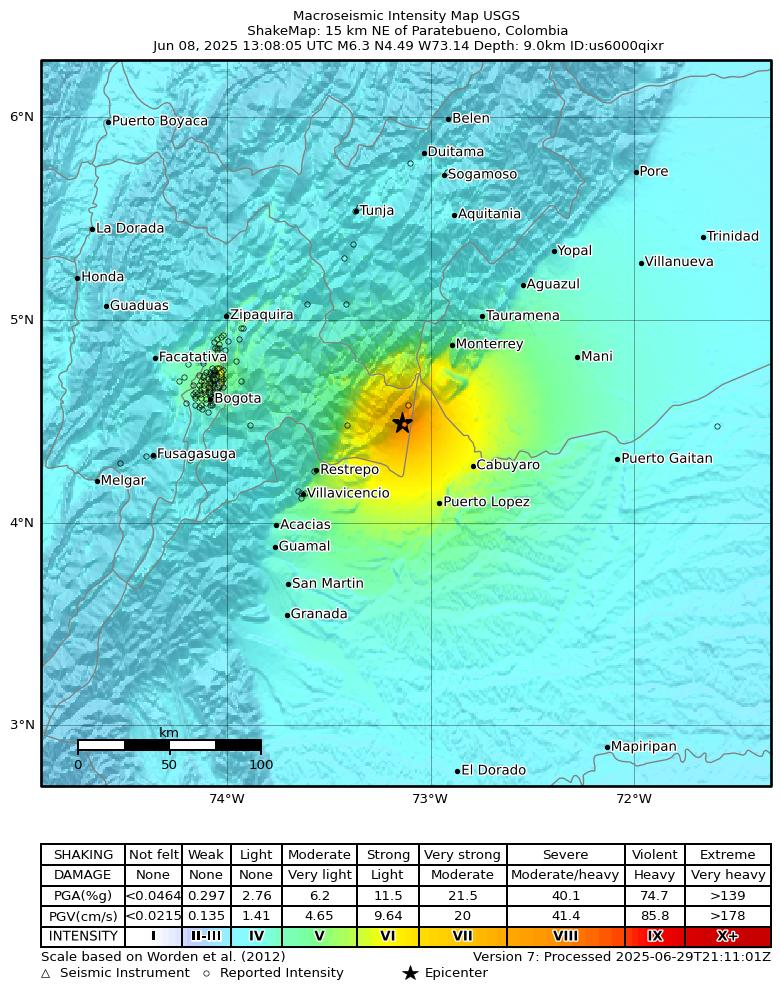
- USGS Shakemap.

- Location within Colombia Location within South America
- UTC time: 2025-06-08 13:08:05
- ISC event
- USGS-ANSS: ComCat
- Local date: 8 June 2025
- Local time: 08:08:05 COT (UTC-5)
- Magnitude: M_{w} 6.3
- Depth: 9 km (6 mi)
- Epicenter: 4.512°N 73.155°W
- Areas affected: Central Colombia
- Max. intensity: MMI VIII (Severe)
- Aftershocks: 4 total; 4 of M ≥ 4; Largest: 4.9 mb
- Casualties: 31 injuries

On 8 June 2025, at 08:08:05 COT (13:08 UTC), a M_{w} 6.3 earthquake struck the Department of Cundinamarca in Colombia, near the town of Paratebueno. The earthquake resulted in at least 31 people being injured.

== Tectonic setting ==
Subduction of the Nazca plate beneath the North Andes plate (part of the South American plate) produces moderately large to great earthquakes along the coastline of Colombia. The megathrust fault forms the northern part of the Peru–Chile Trench, which has been the source of very large earthquakes including the M_{w}8.8 1906 Ecuador–Colombia earthquake, which was the biggest in the region and the sixth largest earthquake to have been instrumentally recorded.

The North Andes plate moves northeastwards relative to the South American plate at a rate of 8.6 mm per year. This motion is partitioned into motion parallel to the plate boundary (right lateral strike-slip) of 8.1 mm per year and 4.3 mm per year perpendicular to the boundary in the form of shortening. The boundary is formed by the Eastern Frontal Fault System, which consists of both thrust faults and oblique-slip faults that together take up this displacement. This boundary has been the source of multiple large tremors, such as the 1967 Neiva, 2008 El Calvario and 2023 Meta-Cundinamarca earthquakes.

== Earthquake ==
The earthquake had an epicenter located in the municipality of Paratebueno in Cundinamarca Department, near the border with the department of Meta. It struck 9 km (5.6 mi) below the surface, and had a maximum Modified Mercalli intensity of VIII (Severe) in Paratebueno, Medina, Barranca de Upía and Cabuyaro, and V (Moderate) in Bogotá and Villavicencio.

== Impact ==
More than 30 people were injured in Paratebueno and Medina. In Paratebueno, closest to the epicenter, 134 houses collapsed, 250 others and six schools, a church, and a highway were damaged and a landslide occurred. In the village of Santa Cecilia, up to 90% of the structures were damaged or destroyed, and a school completely collapsed. At least 45 houses collapsed, 110 others, 15 schools and three churches were damaged in Medina. Eight structures were damaged and power lines were damaged in Tocaima and San Juan de Rioseco. A road between Villavicencio and Yopal also cracked. One house collapsed, a church was damaged and cable lines fell in Mosquera. Some health facilities and a school were also affected in Gachetá and Guasca. Several houses were damaged in Pácora. Two churches and a health center was damaged in Fómeque, Une and Sibaté. In San Pedro de Jagua, the entrance of a cemetery collapsed and a church was damaged. In Cumaral, two buildings were damaged, a road was cracked and a large number of people were hospitalized for panic attacks. In Villavicencio, a water tank collapsed and two shopping centers were damaged. In Bogotá, one person was treated for a panic attack, several others were trapped in elevators, more than 178 structures sustained minor damage and power outages were widespread.

== See also ==
- List of earthquakes in Colombia
- List of earthquakes in 2025
