= 2023 central Colombia earthquakes =

Magnitude 6.3 and 5.7 earthquakes in central Colombia

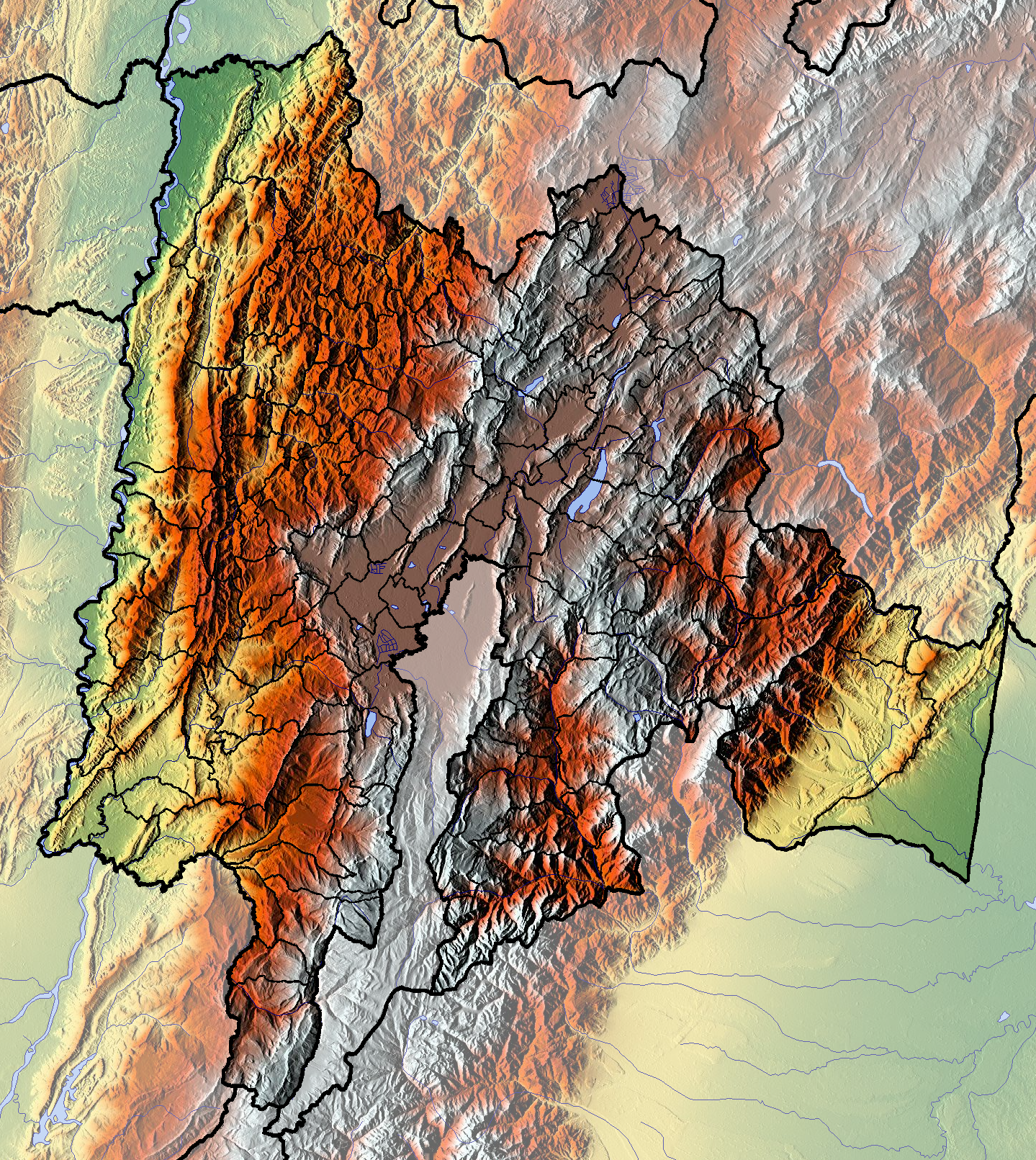
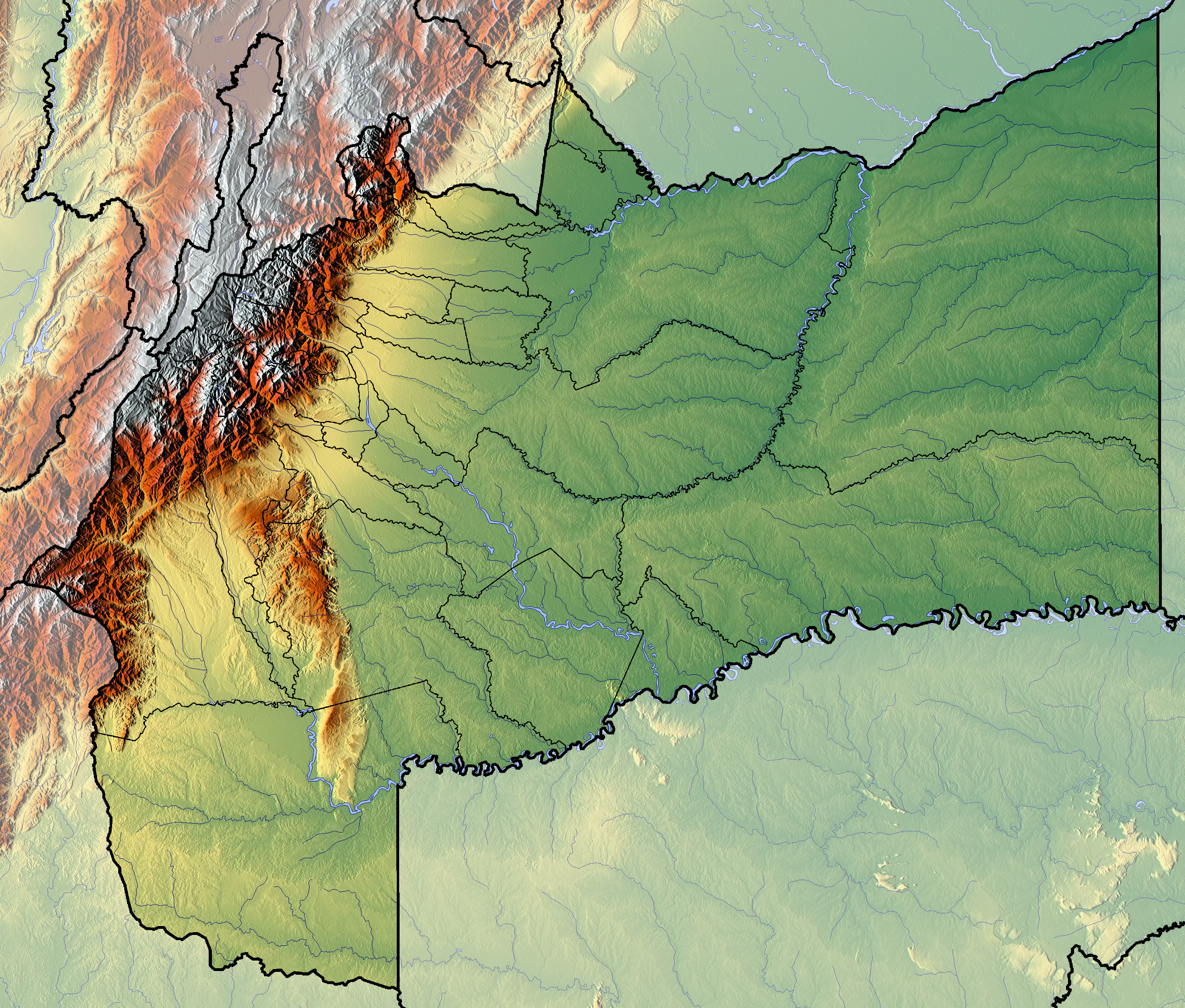
- Location within Colombia Location within Cundinamarca Department Location within Meta Department
- UTC time: 2023-08-17 17:04:59; 2023-08-17 17:17:18
- ISC event: 626686825; 626686828
- USGS-ANSS: ComCat; ComCat
- Local date: 17 August 2023
- Local time: 12:04 (UTC-5); 12:17 (UTC-5)
- Magnitude: 6.1 M_{w}; 5.6 M_{w}
- Depth: 10 km (6 mi)
- Epicenter: 4.35°N 73.59°W
- Areas affected: Colombia, Venezuela
- Max. intensity: MMI VIII (Severe)
- Aftershocks: 64 (as of 18 August); Largest is M_{w}5.0
- Casualties: 2 dead, 50 injured

An earthquake with a moment magnitude of 6.1 and its aftershocks affected the El Calvario Capital-Cordillera subregion (Villavicencio, Restrepo, Cumaral, San Juanito) and Medina province (Medina, Paratebueno), on 17 August 2023.

== Tectonic setting ==
Subduction of the Nazca plate beneath the North Andes plate (part of the South American plate) occasionally produces moderately large to great earthquakes along the coast of Colombia. The megathrust fault forms the northern part of the Peru–Chile Trench, which has been the source of very large earthquakes including the 1906 Ecuador–Colombia earthquake; the magnitude 8.8 tremor is the biggest in the region and the sixth largest earthquake to be instrumentally recorded.

The North Andes plate moves northeastwards relative to the South American plate at a rate of 8.6 mm per year. This motion is partitioned into motion parallel to the plate boundary (right lateral strike-slip) of 8.1 mm per year and 4.3 mm per year perpendicular to the boundary in the form of shortening. The boundary is formed by the Eastern Frontal Fault System, which consists of both thrust faults and oblique-slip faults that together take up this displacement. This boundary has been associated with many damaging historical earthquakes, such as the 1967 Neiva and the 2008 El Calvario earthquakes.

== Earthquake ==
The location of the first earthquake was in El Calvario, in the department of Meta, 70 km (43 mi) southeast of the country's capital, Bogotá. The depth of the earthquakes were about 10 km (6.2 mi) beneath the surface.

Tremors from the earthquakes were strongly felt in Bogotá, with a Modified Mercalli intensity of V (Moderate) reported there.

== Impact ==
=== Damage and casualties ===
At least five of Colombia's departments were affected by the earthquake. In total, at least 20 houses collapsed and 252 others were damaged across the country; damage was reported as far away as Armenia, in Quindío Department. Two people were killed as a result of the earthquake; a woman in Bogotá after jumping from a building and a man after an earthquake-related incident in a mine near Sativanorte. Both were Venezuelan nationals. A total of six buildings collapsed and 154 others were damaged in Meta, while 44 buildings were affected in Cundinamarca, including one that collapsed. Several buildings and a church were also damaged in Boyacá.

In Gachalá, at least 88 houses were affected, including 12 that collapsed; a church and a fire station were also affected. Two people were injured there. The facade of a building collapsed in Guayabetal. Some houses were destroyed and four others partially collapsed in El Calvario, where several students were hospitalized. In Cáqueza, one person was injured and 26 students were hospitalized due to shock, and three houses, the municipal building and a market were damaged. In Sibate, the city hall was damaged and 15 students were hospitalized due to panic. One person in Soacha was injured by a wall collapse and another was hospitalized due to panic. In Sativanorte, another mining incident caused by the earthquake caused one injury. Four minors were also injured, three of them in Meta and another in Boyacá.

Sixty-three buildings and the courthouse in Villavicencio was damaged and windows were broken in several buildings in the city. In Bogotá, at least 178 buildings were damaged. Among them was one of the buildings housing the Congress of Colombia, where parts of the roof fell. In Zulia, Venezuela, a church collapsed.

=== Estimations of losses ===
The United States Geological Survey's PAGER service estimates included an orange-alert level, reporting there was a 93% chance that the earthquake could cause damage between US$1 million and US$10 billion. It also said the earthquake had a 76% of causing between one and 1,000 fatalities.

For the second earthquake, the USGS issued an orange-alert and estimated an 82% chance that it would cause between one and 1,000 fatalities, as well as a 95% of it causing between US$1 million and US$10 billion worth of damage.

== See also ==
- List of earthquakes in Colombia
- List of earthquakes in 2023
