= List of earthquakes in Colombia =

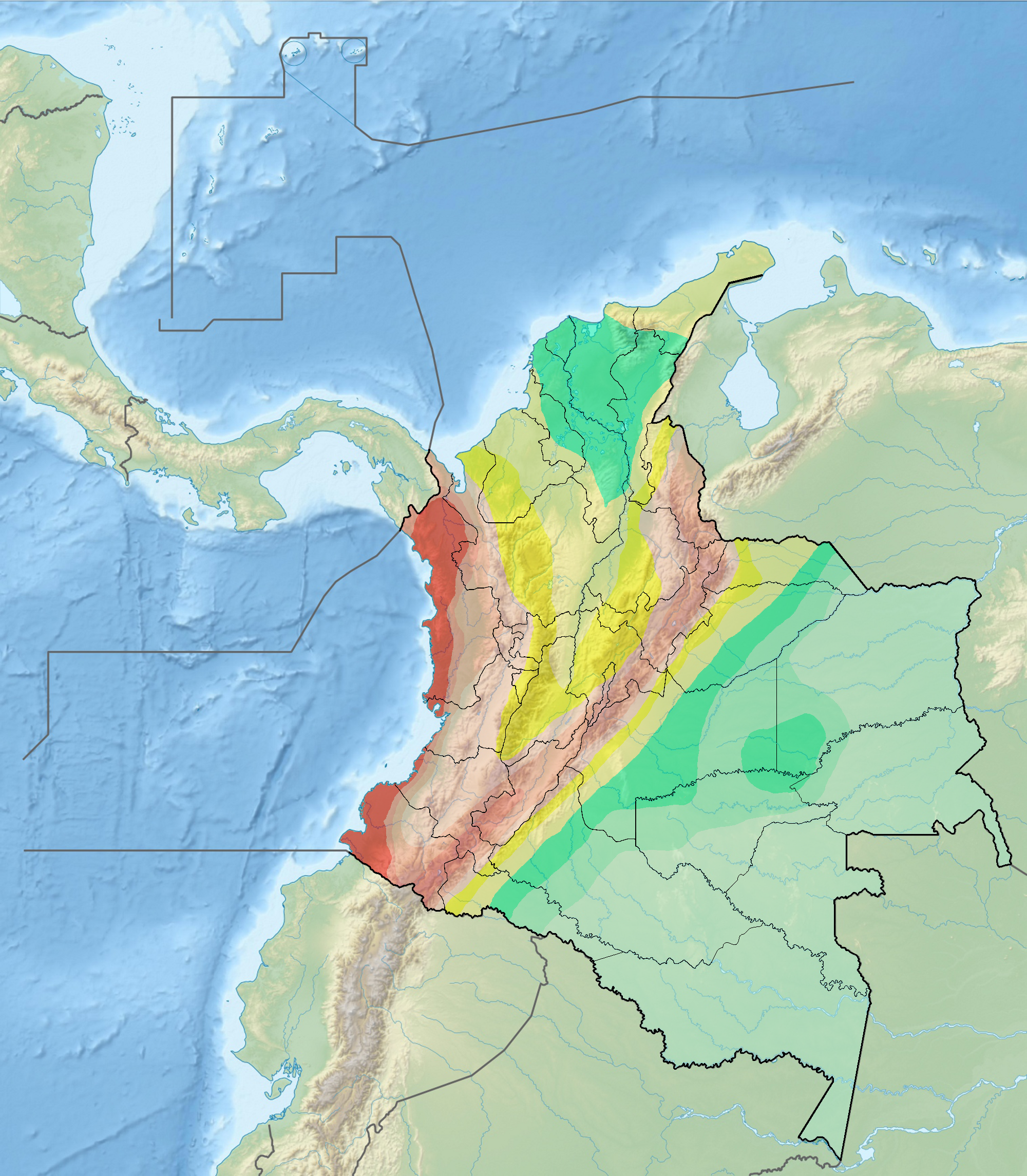
Seismic risk map of Colombia

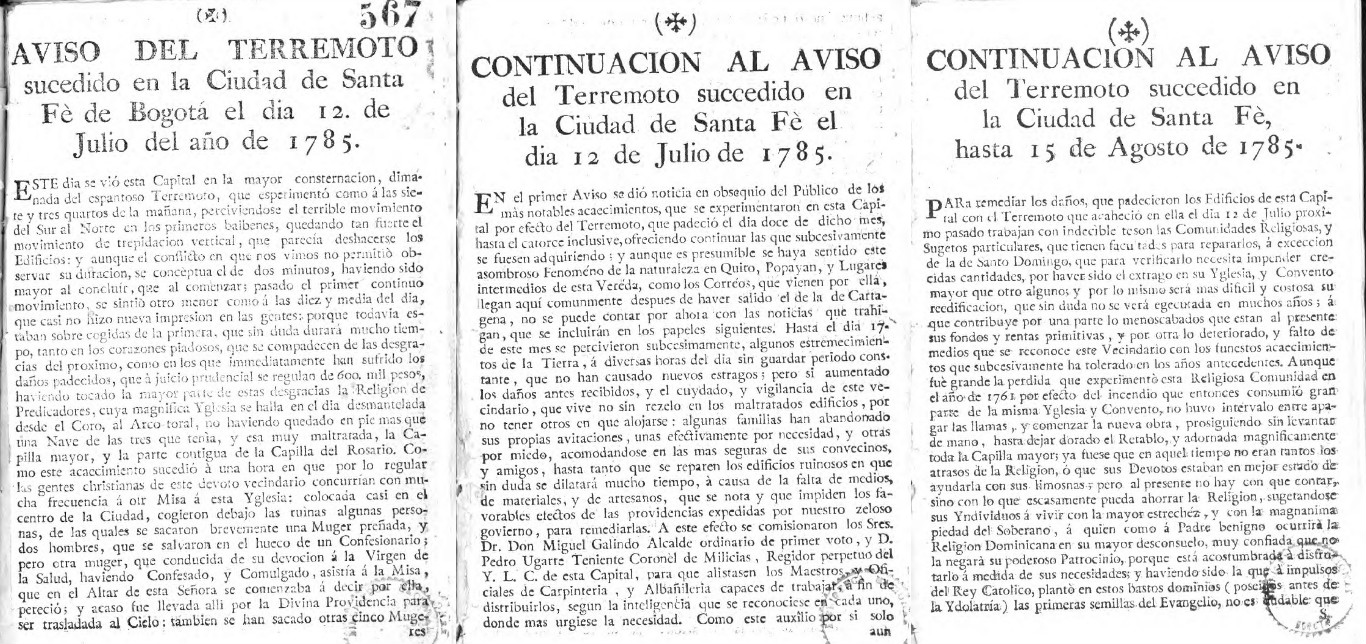
Aviso del Terremoto, 1785

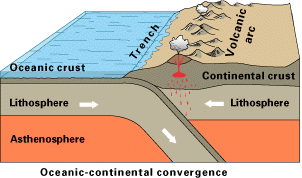
The subduction of the Malpelo plate (left) below the North Andes plate (right) causes most of the earthquakes in Colombia.

This is a list of earthquakes in Colombia. Colombia is a seismically active country and has a large seismic risk in many areas of its territory due to its location at the boundaries of the Malpelo, Panama, Caribbean, North Andes (where most earthquakes occurred) and South American plates along the Pacific Ring of Fire. The southeastern and extreme eastern portions of Colombia are not as seismically active as the rest of the country.

The first historically registered earthquake felt in Colombia occurred on September 11, 1530, around 10:00 AM, probably with the epicentre near Cumaná, Venezuela. The earthquake was documented by Gonzalo Fernández de Oviedo y Valdés in his work La Historia general de las Indias and by friar Bartolomé de las Casas in his book Historia de Las Indias. The first documented earthquake with its epicentre in present-day Colombia territory took place in 1566, with the epicentre estimated around Santander in the department of Cauca. Other important historical earthquakes have been documented by Luis Vargas Jurado, from 1703 until 1764 and Santiago Pérez Valencia between 1785 and 1843.

The most devastating earthquake for Colombia happened on August 15 and 16, 1868 off the coast of Ecuador, leading to approximately 70,000 fatalities. The strongest earthquake, with an estimated moment magnitude of 8.8 also happened offshore Ecuador in 1906. Other major earthquakes were the 1875 Cúcuta earthquake with around 10,000 deaths and the 1999 Armenia earthquake with an intensity of X. The deepest registered earthquake happened in the department of Amazonas in 1970 at an estimated depth of almost 645 kilometres (2,116,000 ft). The 1785 Viceroyalty of New Granada earthquake sparked the birth of journalism in Colombia, initiated by Manuel del Socorro Rodríguez, six years after the publication of the Aviso del Terremoto about the earthquake with its epicentre in La Calera, Cundinamarca.

The main seismically active zone is the subduction zone of the Malpelo, formerly Nazca, Plate with strong earthquakes in 1906, 1947, 1958 and 1979. The most active onshore fault systems are the 674 kilometres (419 mi) Bucaramanga-Santa Marta Fault with earthquakes frequently occurring at the Bucaramanga Nest around Aratoca, Santander, the 697.4 kilometres (433.3 mi) Romeral Fault System in the Central Ranges (Popayán 1983 and Armenia 1999) and the 921.4 kilometres (572.5 mi) long Eastern Frontal Fault System in the Eastern Ranges. Other strong earthquakes are associated with the Murindó (M_{w} 7.2, 1992), Irlanda (M_{w} 6.8, 1994), Tucurá (M_{w} 6.7, 1952), Bahía Solano (M_{w} 6.5, 1970), and Mutatá Faults (M_{w} 6.0, 2016).

== Major historical earthquakes ==
Note: out of many, only earthquakes of M_{w} 6.0 and higher, deadly, important historical, and unusual earthquakes are included in this list
Magnitudes – M_{w} Moment magnitude scale, M_{L} Richter scale, M_{s} Surface-wave magnitude, ? Unknown scale

Year	Date	Time UTC−05	Place bold is fault	Name	Plate	Depth (km)	Fatalities	Mag.	MMI	Tsunami	Map	Notes
1646	April 3	02:00-03:00	Muzo-La Palma; Boyacá; Cundinamarca	1646 Muzo	North Andes		"dozens"		IX	No	List of earthquakes in Colombia is located in Colombia	
1743	October 18		Chingaza Páramo, Cundinamarca	1743 Chingaza	North Andes	20	"several"	6.30 ± 0.35 B&W97	IX	No	List of earthquakes in Colombia is located in Colombia	(Note: Bakun & Wentworth 1997 scale)
1785	July 12	07:45	La Calera, Cundinamarca	1785 Viceroyalty of New Granada	North Andes	20–30	9	6.9 M_{s}	VIII	No	List of earthquakes in Colombia is located in Colombia	
1827	November 16	22:45	Timaná, Huila	1827 Timaná	North Andes	10	250	7.7 M_{s}	X	No	List of earthquakes in Colombia is located in Colombia	
1834	January 20	12:00	Sibundoy, Sibundoy, Putumayo	1834 Sibundoy	North Andes	5	80	7.0 ?	IX	No	List of earthquakes in Colombia is located in Colombia	
1868	August 15; August 16	14:30; 01:30	Ecuador, Colombia	1868 Ecuador	North Andes	20	70,000	6.3 and 6.7 M_{s}	X	No	List of earthquakes in Colombia is located in Colombia	
1875	May 18	16:25	Cúcuta	1875 Cúcuta	North Andes	20	10,000	7.5 ?	IX	No	List of earthquakes in Colombia is located in Colombia	
1906	January 31	15:36	Esmeraldas (Ecuador)	1906 Ecuador–Colombia	Malpelo	20.0	1,000~	8.8 M_{w} 8.6 M_{L}	VIII	Yes; 5 m (16 ft)	List of earthquakes in Colombia is located in Colombia	
1917	August 31	11:36	Acacías, Meta	1917 Sumapaz	North Andes	40	6	7.3 M_{s}	VII	No	List of earthquakes in Colombia is located in Colombia	
1936	January 9	09:23	Túquerres	1936 Túquerres	North Andes	<30	250	7.0 ?	VIII	No	List of earthquakes in Colombia is located in Colombia	
1952	February 14	16:02	Tucurá, Pavarandocito, Antioquia	1952 Pavarandocito	North Andes	44		6.75 M_{w}		No	List of earthquakes in Colombia is located in Colombia	
1958	January 19	14:07	Ecuador, Colombia	1958 Ecuador–Colombia	North Andes	40–60	111	7.8 M_{w} 7.6 M_{L}	VIII	Yes; 1.5 m (4.9 ft)	List of earthquakes in Colombia is located in Colombia	
1962	July 30	15:18	Aranzazu, Caldas	1962 Aranzazu	North Andes	69	50~	6.8 M_{w}	VIII	No	List of earthquakes in Colombia is located in Colombia	
1967	February 9	15:24	Algeciras, Algeciras, Huila	1967 Neiva	North Andes	55.0	98	7.2 M_{w} 6.8 M_{L}	VIII	No		
1967	July 29	05:24	Bucaramanga, Aratoca, Santander	1967 Aratoca	North Andes	161.2		6.8 M_{w}	IV	No		
1970	July 31	17:08	Amazonas	1970 Colombia	South American	644.8	1	8.0 M_{w} 7.7 M_{L}	IV	No		
1970	September 26	22:38	Bahía Solano, Bahía Solano, Chocó	1970 Bahía Solano	North Andes	15.0		6.5 M_{w}	VII			
1975	January 24	21:08	Chocó	1975 Chocó	Panama	36.0		6.5 M_{s}	VII			
1979	November 23	18:40	El Cairo	1979 El Cairo	North Andes	108.0	44	7.2 M_{w} 6.7 M_{L}	VII	No		
1979	December 12	07:59	Tumaco	1979 Tumaco	North Andes	33	600	8.1 M_{s}	IX	Yes; 5 m (16 ft)		
1983	March 31	08:15	Rosas-Julumito, Popayán	1983 Popayán	North Andes	12.0	300	5.5 M_{L}	VIII	No	List of earthquakes in Colombia is located in Colombia	
1987	March 5 March 6	20:54, 23:10; 03:14	Ecuador, Colombia	1987 Ecuador-Colombia	North Andes	8.5; 14.1	1,000; 4,000+ missing	6.0-7.2 M_{w}	VII	No		
1991	November 19	17:28	Chocó	1991 Chocó	North Andes	21.3		7.2 M_{w}	IX			
1992	October 18	10:11	Murindó, Murindó, Antioquia	1992 Murindó	North Andes	10.0	10	7.2 M_{w}	X	No		
1994	June 6	20:47	Irlanda, Páez	1994 Páez River	North Andes	12	1,100	6.8 M_{w}	VII	No		
1995	January 19	10:05	Guaicáramo, Tauramena	1995 Tauramena	North Andes	17.3	6	6.0 M_{L} 6.5 M_{w}	VII	No		
1995	February 8	13:40	Cali	1995 Cali	North Andes	73.5	35	6.4 M_{w}	V	No		
1996	November 4	12:24	Chocó	1996 Colombia-Panama	Panama	14.0		6.3 M_{w}	VIII	No		
1999	January 25	18:19	Córdoba-Navarco, Armenia	1999 Armenia	North Andes	17.0	1,900	6.1 M_{w}	X	No		
2004	November 15	04:06	Bajo Baudó, Pacific Ocean, Chocó	2004 Bajo Baudó	North Andes	15.0		6.7 M_{L} 7.2 M_{w}	VIII			
2007	September 9	20:49	Gorgona Island	2007 Gorgona Island	North Andes	15.0	5 injured / 34 homes damaged	6.8 M_{w}	VII			
2008	May 24	19:20	El Calvario	2008 El Calvario	North Andes	35	11	5.9 M_{w}	VII	No		
2012	September 30	11:31	La Vega	2012 La Vega	North Andes	170		7.3 M_{w}	VII	No		
2013	February 9	09:16	Yacuanquer, Nariño	2013 Nariño	North Andes	145		6.9 M_{w}	VI	No		
2013	August 13	10:43	Chocó	2013 Chocó	Coiba	12.0		6.7 M_{w}	V			
2015	March 10	15:55	Bucaramanga, Aratoca, Santander	2015 Santander	North Andes	155		6.2 M_{w}	VI	No		
2016	April 16	18:58	Ecuador, Colombia	2016 Ecuador-Colombia	North Andes	20.6	676	7.8 M_{w}	IX	No		
2016	September 13	20:58	Mutatá, Mutatá, Antioquia	2016 Mutatá	North Andes	18.0		6.0 M_{w}	VI	No		
2018	June 12	04:35	Pasto, Nariño	2018 Pasto	North Andes	10.0	2	4.9 M_{w}	VI	No		
2021	March 1	17:57	Antioquia Department	2021 Antioquia	North Andes	10.0	3	5.1 M_{w}	VI	No		
2023	August 17	12:04	Meta Department	2023 Central Colombia	North Andes	10.0	2	6.1 M_{w}	VII	No		
2025	June 8	13:08	Cundinamarca Department	2025 Cundinamarca	North Andes	9.0		6.3 M_{w}	VIII	No		
2025	September 14	02:17	Antioquia Department	2025 Antoquia	North Andes	50.2	1	5.4 M_{w}	V	No		
2026	August 10	07:34	Chocó Department	2026 Chocó	North Andes	108.2	335	7.4 M_{w}	VIII	No		

== See also ==
- Geology of Colombia
- Lists of earthquakes
  - List of earthquakes in Ecuador
  - List of earthquakes in Panama
  - List of earthquakes in Peru
  - List of earthquakes in Venezuela
- List of volcanoes in Colombia

== Notes and references ==
=== References ===
==== Bibliography ====
- Bakun, W.H.; Wentworth, C.M. (1997), "Estimating Earthquake Location and Magnitude from Seismic Intensity Data" (PDF), Bulletin of the Seismological Society of America, 87 (6): 1502–1521, Bibcode:1997BuSSA..87.1502B, doi:10.1785/BSSA0870061502
- Espinosa Baquero, Armando (1999), "El terremoto de los Muzos (1646, abril 3) a la luz de un excepcional documento colonial, la relación de Don Bartolomé de Mázmela y Poveda" (PDF), Revista de la Academia Colombiana de Ciencias Exactas, Físicas y Naturales, 31: 205–212
- Espinosa Baquero, Armando (2001), "La sismicidad histórica en Colombia – Historical seismicity in Colombia" (PDF), Revista Geográfica Venezolana, 44: 271–283
- Giesecke, A.; Capera, A.A.G.; Leschiutta, I.; Migliorini, E.; Valverde, L.R. (2004), "The CERESIS earthquake catalogue and database of the Andean Region: background, characteristics and examples of use" (PDF), Annals of Geophysics, 47 (2/3): 421–435
- Gómez Capera, Augusto Antonio; Salcedo Hurtado, Elkin de Jesús; Bindi, Dino; Choy, José Enrique; García Peláez, Julio Antonio (2014), "Localización y magnitud del terremoto de 1785 en Colombia calculadas a partir de intensidades macrosísmicas" (PDF), Revista de la Academia Colombiana de Ciencias Exactas, Físicas y Naturales, 38 (147): 206–217, doi:10.18257/raccefyn.63
- Marín Arias, J.P.; Castillo González, H.; Salcedo Hurtado, E. de J. (2006), "Modelo geométrico del foco del terremoto de Popayán (Colombia) a partir de datos macrosísmicos", Boletín de Geología, Universidad Industrial de Santander, 28: 93–109
- Mendoza, C.; Dewey, J.W. (1984), "Seismicity associated with the great Colombia-Ecuador earthquakes of 1942, 1958, and 1979: Implications for barrier models of earthquake rupture", Bulletin of the Seismological Society of America, 74 (2): 577–593
- Paris, Gabriel; Machette, Michael N.; Dart, Richard L.; Haller, Kathleen M. (2000), Map and Database of Quaternary Faults and Folds in Colombia and its Offshore Regions (PDF), United States Geological Survey, pp. 1–66
- Ramírez, Jesús Emilio (1975), Historia de los terremotos en Colombia, Instituto Geográfico Agustín Codazzi, pp. 1–250
- Salcedo Hurtado, Elkin de Jesús; Gómez Capera, Augusto Antonio (2013), "Estudio macrosísmico del terremoto del 18 de octubre de 1743 en la región central de Colombia" (PDF), Boletín de Geología, Universidad Industrial de Santander, 35: 109–128
- Sarabia Gómez, Ana Milena; Cifuentes Avendaño, Hernán Guillermo; Robertson, Kim (2010a), "Análisis histórico de los sismos ocurridos en 1785 y en 1917 en el centro de Colombia" (PDF), Revista Colombiana de Geografía, 19 (19): 153–162, doi:10.15446/rcdg.n19.16863
- Sarabia, Ana Milena; Cifuentes Avendaño, Hernán Guillermo; Dimaté, Cristina (2010b), Sismos históricos en el Departamento de Nariño, INGEOMINAS, p. 1
- Various, Authors (2014), Enciclopedia de desastres naturales históricos de Colombia (PDF), Universidad del Quindío, pp. 1–21
- Various, Authors (2008a), Ficha Resumen de Efectos: Terremoto del 16 de Noviembre de 1827 (PDF), Universidad del Valle, pp. 30–39
- Various, Authors (2008b), Ficha Resumen de Efectos: Terremoto del 30 de Julio de 1962 (PDF), Universidad del Valle, pp. 83–95
