= La Plata Fault =

- Chusma Fault, Falla de La Plata, Falla de Chusma
- Location within Colombia
- Etymology: La Plata
- Coordinates: 02°15′42.6″N 76°00′03.2″W
- Country: Colombia
- Region: Andean
- State: Huila
- Cities: La Plata, Teruel

Characteristics
- Range: Central Ranges, Andes
- Part of: Andean oblique faults
- Length: 113.2 km (70.3 mi)
- Strike: 039 ± 12
- Dip: West
- Dip angle: 40-60
- Displacement: 0.2–1 mm (0.0079–0.0394 in)/yr

Tectonics
- Plate: North Andean
- Status: Active
- Earthquakes: 1967, 1996
- Type: Oblique thrust fault
- Movement: Dextral reverse
- Rock units: Honda Group
- Age: Quaternary
- Orogeny: Andean

The La Plata or Chusma Fault (Spanish: Falla de La Plata, Falla de Chusma) is a dextral oblique thrust fault in the department of Huila in southwestern Colombia. The fault has a total length of 113.2 kilometres (70.3 mi) and runs along an average northeast to southwest strike of 039 ± 12 in the Central Ranges of the Colombian Andes.

== Etymology ==
The fault is named after La Plata, Huila.

== Description ==
The La Plata or Chusma Fault extends across the eastern slope of the Central Ranges of the Colombian Andes, southeast of the city of Neiva in southwestern Colombia. The fault displaces Triassic, Jurassic and Cretaceous sedimentary rocks, as well as Tertiary volcanic rocks. Coalescent Quaternary alluvial fan deposits are offset by the La Plata Fault. The trace is characterised by old retreated and declined scarps, en-echelon semiparallel associated faults that cut alluvial deposits of the Páez River and local lahar deposits, a well developed topographic fault-line expression, and a probable pull-apart basin filled with Quaternary alluvial fans and alluvium near the town of La Plata. The slip rate has been estimated at 0.2 to 1 millimetre (0.0079 to 0.0394 in) per year based on geomorphologic expression. Activity of the fault in 1967 and 1996 has been registered.

== See also ==
- List of earthquakes in Colombia
- Eastern Frontal Fault System
- Irlanda Fault
- La Dina Fault
- Romeral Fault System
