= Naya-Micay Fault =

- Falla de Naya-Micay
- Location within Colombia
- Etymology: Naya & Micay Rivers
- Location: Tumaco Basin
- Coordinates: 03°15′41.0″N 77°22′54.2″W
- Country: Colombia
- Region: Pacific/Chocó
- State: Cauca, Valle del Cauca

Characteristics
- Part of: Pacific oblique faults
- Length: 158.2 km (98.3 mi)
- Strike: 034.1 ± 12
- Dip: East
- Dip angle: unknown
- Displacement: 0.2–1 mm (0.0079–0.0394 in)/yr

Tectonics
- Plate: North Andean
- Status: Inactive
- Type: Oblique thrust fault
- Movement: Dextral reverse
- Age: Quaternary
- Orogeny: Andean

The Naya-Micay Fault (Spanish: Falla de Naya-Micay) is a dextral oblique thrust fault in the departments of Cauca and Valle del Cauca in Colombia. The fault has a total length of 158.2 kilometres (98.3 mi) and runs along an average northeast to southwest strike of 034.1 ± 12 in the Tumaco Basin along the Pacific Coast of Colombia.

== Etymology ==
The fault is named after the Naya and Micay Rivers.

== Description ==
The Naya-Micay Fault runs parallel to and inland of the southwestern Pacific Coast of Colombia in the Cauca and Valle del Cauca departments from Guapi in the south to Buenaventura in the north. The fault displaces marine and non-marine Pliocene sedimentary rocks. It locally offsets undifferentiated Quaternary alluvial deposits. In general, there are uplifted Tertiary sediments on the east and Quaternary sediments on the western side of the fault. The fault appears to be a northern continuation of the Remolino-El Charco Fault. The fault controls drainage of the Guapi River, locally offsets Quaternary deposits, and forms folded paleosoils, elongated basins and ridges and has strong general linear features. Along the coast, it forms typical fault-controlled linear landforms.

== See also ==
- List of earthquakes in Colombia
- Romeral Fault System
- Malpelo Plate
