= Bahía Solano Fault =

Geological fault in Columbia

- Falla Bahía Solano, Utría Fault, Utría-Bahía Solano Fault
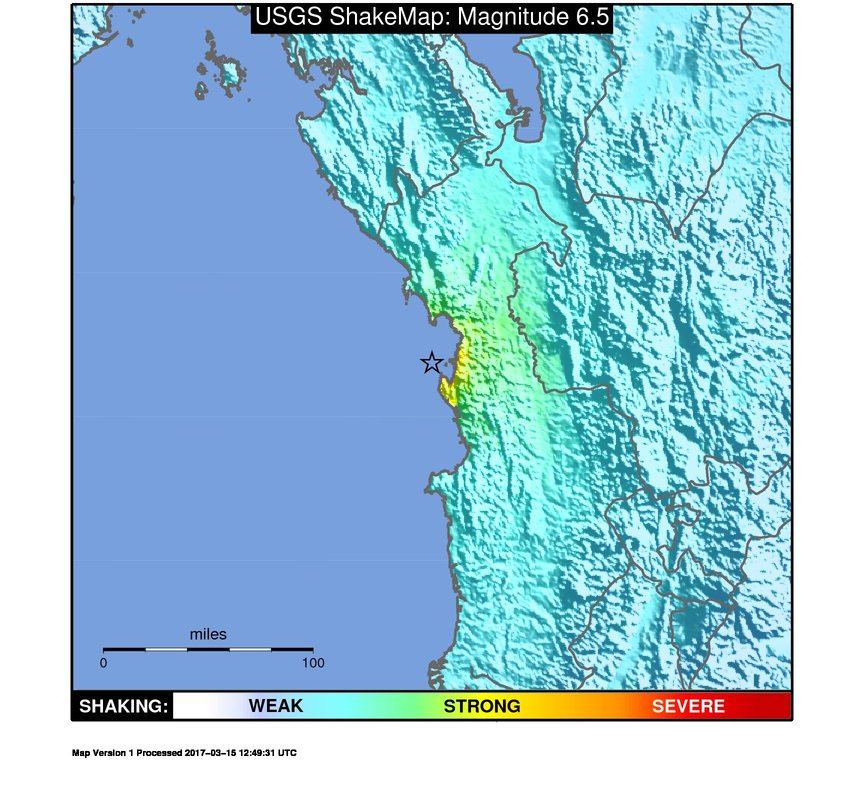
- ShakeMap of the 1970 Bahía Solano earthquake

- Location within Colombia
- Etymology: Bahía Solano
- Coordinates: 05°53′13″N 77°21′47″W
- Country: Colombia
- Region: Pacific/Chocó
- State: Chocó
- Cities: Nuquí

Characteristics
- Range: Serranía del Baudó
- Part of: Pacific thrust faults
- Length: 290.6 km (180.6 mi)
- Width: up to 5 km (3.1 mi)
- Strike: 347 ± 13
- Dip: West
- Dip angle: unknown
- Displacement: 0.2–1 mm (0.0079–0.0394 in)/yr

Tectonics
- Plate: Panama, Coiba, North Andean
- Status: Active
- Earthquakes: 1970 Bahía Solano (M_{w} 6.5)
- Type: Thrust fault
- Movement: Reverse
- Rock units: Uva Formation, Baudó Basalt
- Age: Quaternary
- Orogeny: Andean

The Bahía Solano Fault (Spanish: Falla Bahía Solano), Utría Fault or Utría-Bahía Solano Fault is a westward dipping thrust fault in the department of Chocó on the Pacific Coast of Colombia. The fault has a total length of 290.6 kilometres (180.6 mi) and runs along an average north–south strike of 347 ± 13 from the Panama-Colombia border to Bajo Baudó. The fault is partly offshore in the bays of Solano and Utría and crosses the Chocó Basin and the coastal Serranía del Baudó. Movement of the fault produced the M_{w} 6.5 1970 Bahía Solano earthquake.

== Etymology ==
The fault is named after Bahía Solano, Chocó.

== Description ==
The Bahía Solano Fault extends along the Pacific Coast of Colombia, bordering the Panama, Coiba, Malpelo and North Andes Plates. It bounds a structural valley between the Solano Bay and Utría Bay, and displaces the Eocene turbidites of the Uva Formation in the south, and Cretaceous oceanic Baudó Basalts in the north, The fault forms a well developed and continuous fault line (scarp), and the brecciated zone of the fault reaches 5 kilometres (3.1 mi) in width. The peninsulas of Cabo Corrientes and Bahía Solano are composed of oceanic crust displaced by the Bahía Solano Fault.

Segments of the fault have been called Utría Fault, and Utría-Bahía Solano Fault.

=== Activity ===
The slip rate of the fault is estimated at between 0.2 and 1 millimetre (0.0079 and 0.0394 in) per year. The fault is active and produced the 1970 Bahía Solano earthquake with a moment magnitude of 6.5 and a depth of 15 km (9.3 mi). The earthquake was followed by 123 aftershocks in the period from September 26 to October 7, 1970.

== See also ==
- List of earthquakes in Colombia
- Coiba plate
- Andinobates altobueyensis
