= La Dina Fault =

- Falla La Dina, El Agrado-Betania Fault
- Location within Colombia
- Coordinates: 02°55′52″N 75°25′36″W
- Country: Colombia
- Region: Andean
- State: Huila, Tolima

Characteristics
- Range: Central Ranges, Andes
- Part of: Andean oblique faults
- Length: 206.9 km (128.6 mi)
- Strike: 032.9 ± 13
- Dip: West
- Dip angle: 40-60
- Displacement: 0.2–1 mm (0.0079–0.0394 in)/yr

Tectonics
- Plate: North Andean
- Status: Inactive
- Type: Oblique thrust fault
- Movement: Dextral reverse
- Rock units: Honda Gp., Chicoral Gp., Olini Gp., Saldaña Fm.
- Age: Quaternary
- Orogeny: Andean

La Dina Fault (Spanish: Falla La Dina) is a regional dextral oblique thrust fault in the departments of Huila and Tolima in southwestern Colombia. The fault has a total length of 206.9 kilometres (128.6 mi) and runs along an average northeast to southwest strike of 032.9 ± 13 in the Upper Magdalena Valley and the Central Ranges of the Colombian Andes.

== Description ==
La Dina Fault lies east of La Plata Fault in southwestern Colombia. The fault displaces Jurassic (Saldaña Formation), Cretaceous (Chicoral and Olini Groups), and Tertiary (Honda Group) sedimentary rocks, which are common in the Upper Magdalena Valley. Local names assigned to the southern extension of this fault are from north to south: Betania, Pital-Agredo and Magdalena. It is also called the El Agrado-Betania Fault in Huila, where it underlies the Betania Reservoir. The fault is marked by well-developed trace, abrupt slope changes, saddles, and small scarps.

== See also ==
- List of earthquakes in Colombia
- Garzón-Pitalito Fault
- La Plata Fault
