= José Maria de Yermo y Parres =

Mexican Roman Catholic priest

Saint José Maria de Yermo y Parres
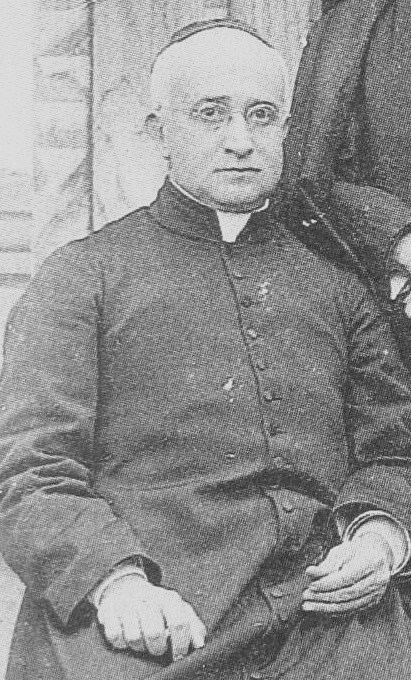
- June 1904 photo.

Priest
- Born: 10 November 1851; Jalmolonga, Estado de México, Mexico
- Died: 20 September 1904 (aged 52); Puebla de los Angeles, Mexico
- Venerated in: Roman Catholic Church
- Beatified: 6 May 1990, Basilica of Our Lady of Guadalupe, Mexico City by Pope John Paul II
- Canonized: 21 May 2000, Saint Peter's Square, Vatican City by Pope John Paul II
- Feast: 19 September
- Attributes: Priest's cassock
- Patronage: Servants of the Sacred Heart of Jesus and of the Poor

José María de Yermo y Parres (10 November 1851 – 20 September 1904) was a Mexican Roman Catholic priest and the founder of the Servants of the Sacred Heart of Jesus and of the Poor. He dedicated his life to catering to the needs of the abandoned and used his order to take care of the poor's spiritual and material needs. He also was once a vowed member of the Congregation of the Mission due to his devotion to Saint Vincent de Paul but left it after experiencing a sudden vocational crisis.

Pope John Paul II canonised the late priest as a saint in 2000 after he had beatified him in Mexico in 1990.

== Life ==
José Maria de Yermo y Parres was born on 10 November 1851 to Manuel de Yermo y Soviñas and María Josefa Parres (d. 30 December 1851); the Yermos came from a line of nobles in Spain before going to Mexico. The death of his mother saw his father return to the capital and ask his sister Carmen to take care of him. The child spent his time under the care of his paternal aunt and grandmother who instilled religious values in him.

In 1864 he received from Maximilian I of Mexico a medal of honor for his distinctions as a student. He had received his education from private teachers before going to private schools. It was in 1863 that he met and forged a lifelong friendship with the distinguished poet Juan de Dios Peza.

In 1867 he left home in order to enter the Congregation of the Mission and he made his vows into the order in Toluca on 10 November 1868. His superiors sent him to the order's motherhouse in Paris for studies and he later returned in 1870 around the time he experienced a sudden vocational crisis. He departed the order around this time due to this crisis and returned home. But his friend, the priest Miguel Arizmendi, continued to guide him and advised him to continue his studies for the priesthood while his uncle José Maria Diez de Sollano y Dávalos approved the decision for him to do so. Nevertheless, he managed to discern his path and returned to his wish of becoming a priest despite not re-entering the Vincentians. He was ordained to the priesthood on 24 August 1879. After his ordination the new diocesan bishop (Sollano's successor) assigned him to the two small churches of El Calvario and Santo Niño despite viewing this as a humiliation of his record of good work where he was prior to this; he however managed to discern the will of God and depart for his new assignment in obedience to Him. On one occasion he happened to see a group of pigs eat the remains of two abandoned newborns and this sickening sight made him feel as if he should help those who were abandoned.

The priest opened "The Shelter of the Sacred Heart" on 13 December 1885 to cater to the needs of the poor in a move that laid the foundation for beginning a new religious order dedicated to serving the poor and at the same time evolved that into the order he titled the Servants of the Sacred Heart of Jesus and the Poor at the summit of El Calvario. He founded several hospitals and orphanages as well as shelters for the abused and he also collaborated with the Tarahumara people towards the end of his life. He often said: "Let us speak about saints to forge saints".

He died in the morning of 20 September 1904 in Puebla de los Angeles of a stomach ulcer after asking the nuns to sing the Ave Maria Stella; he was buried there at the motherhouse of the order. His order now operates in the places such as the United States of America and Nicaragua amongst others.

== Sainthood ==
The sainthood process commenced in Puebla de Los Angeles in an informative process that was inaugurated in the diocese on 6 May 1949 though soon remained inactive for a few decades before a decree was issued allowing the informative process to resume on 13 September 1976; the informative process finally concluded its work on 3 April 1978. The formal start to the cause came on 31 July 1981 after the Congregation for the Causes of Saints issued the official "nihil obstat" to the cause and titled the late priest as a Servant of God. The cognitional process was later opened on 1 July 1983 and closed on 8 August 1983 before both processes received validation from the C.C.S. on 7 June 1985 before the C.C.S. received the Positio dossier from the postulation in 1988.

Theologians granted approval to the cause on 19 May 1989 as did the C.C.S. on 4 July 1989 which allowed for Pope John Paul II to confirm that the late priest had lived a life of heroic virtue on 7 September 1989 in a move that accorded upon him the title of Venerable. The process for the miracle leading to beatification spanned from July to August 1981 and was validated later on 20 October 1989 before a medical board approved it on 28 February 1990; theologians followed suit on 23 March 1990 as did the C.C.S. on 24 April 1990. The pope approved it on 26 April 1990 and later beatified the priest while on a visit to Mexico City on 6 May 1990.

The process for the miracle leading to canonization spanned for a brief period of time in May 1998 before receiving validation on 26 June 1998. A medical board approved the miracle on 19 November 1998 while theologians did so too on 7 May 1999 as did the C.C.S. on 5 October 1999. The pope issued the final approval needed on 20 December 1999 and then canonized the late priest on 21 May 2000 in Saint Peter's Square.
