= Remolino-El Charco Fault =

- Falla de Remolino-El Charco
- Location within Colombia
- Etymology: Remolino Grande & El Charco
- Location: Tumaco Basin
- Coordinates: 02°11′41.9″N 78°25′57.0″W
- Country: Colombia
- Region: Pacific/Chocó
- State: Nariño
- Cities: Tumaco

Characteristics
- Part of: Pacific strike-slip faults
- Length: 148.7 km (92.4 mi)
- Strike: 046.4 ± 6
- Dip: Vertical
- Displacement: <0.2 mm (0.0079 in)/yr

Tectonics
- Plate: North Andean
- Status: Inactive
- Type: Strike-slip fault
- Movement: Dextral
- Age: Quaternary
- Orogeny: Andean

The Remolino-El Charco Fault (Spanish: Falla de Remolino-El Charco) is a dextral strike-slip fault in the department of Nariño in Colombia. The fault has a total length of 148.7 kilometres (92.4 mi) and runs along an average northeast to southwest strike of 046.4 ± 6 in the Tumaco Basin along the Pacific Coast of Colombia.

== Etymology ==
The fault is named after Remolino Grande and El Charco, Nariño.

== Description ==
The Remolino-El Charco Fault extends through the Pacific coastal lowlands and plains of Colombia to the east of the city of Tumaco. The fault begins in the southwesternmost point of Colombia and runs towards Guapi. It is close to and parallels the coast. It displaces alluvial fan sediments of the Patía, Mira, and Telembí Rivers and some Pleistocene marine terraces. The fault appears to be a southern continuation of the Naya-Micay Fault. The fault has a very well defined fault line on aerial photographs and satellite images. Pattern of deflection of streams suggests west side of fault is up.

== See also ==
- List of earthquakes in Colombia
- Romeral Fault System
- Malpelo Plate
