= Tucurá Fault =

- Falla de Tucurá
- Location within Colombia
- Etymology: Tucurá
- Coordinates: 07°40′40″N 76°30′00″W
- Country: Colombia
- Region: Andean, Caribbean
- State: Antioquia, Córdoba
- Cities: Dabeiba

Characteristics
- Range: Sinú-San Jacinto Basin, Central Ranges, Andes
- Part of: Andean thrust faults
- Length: 74.3 km (46.2 mi)
- Strike: 356 ± 4
- Dip: East
- Dip angle: 70-80
- Displacement: 0.2–1 mm (0.0079–0.0394 in)/yr

Tectonics
- Plate: North Andean
- Status: Active
- Earthquakes: 12 February 1952 (M_{W} 6.7); 3 December 1970 (M_{W} 5.7); 31 August 1977 (M_{W} 5.7)
- Type: Thrust fault
- Movement: Oblique slightly sinistral reverse
- Age: Quaternary
- Orogeny: Andean

The Tucurá Fault (Spanish: Falla de Tucurá) is a thrust fault in the departments of Córdoba and Antioquia in northern Colombia. The fault has a total length of 74.3 kilometres (46.2 mi) and runs along an average north-northwest to south-southeast strike of 356 ± 4 in the Sinú-San Jacinto Basin and the Central Ranges of the Colombian Andes. The fault is considered active because of three M_{W} 5.7-6.7 earthquakes associated with the Tucurá Fault occurring in the twentieth century.

== Etymology ==
The fault is named after Tucurá.

== Description ==
The Tucura Fault is located in the northern part of the Central Ranges of the Colombian Andes, west of the Romeral Fault System. It extends from the Paderisco River in the south to the Sinú Valley in the north, where it crosses the Serranía de Abibe. The fault crosscuts middle and upper Tertiary folded marine sedimentary rocks and Quaternary alluvial deposits. The fault controls drainage, forms linear ridges, topographic lineaments, and fault scarps about 4 metres (13 ft) high on Quaternary terraces south of the town of Dabeiba, Antioquia. There are strong linear features on the right margin of the Esmeralda and Sinú Rivers; these include fault saddles and slight slope changes in alluvial terraces. Tertiary rock units are thrust over Quaternary deposits and striae are found on the shear planes.

The fault is probably active with three earthquakes occurring in the twentieth century in the vicinity of the fault, February 12, 1952 (M_{W} 6.7), December 3, 1970 (M_{W} 5.7) and August 31, 1977 (M_{W} 5.7). The slip rate is estimated at 0.2 to 1 millimetre (0.0079 to 0.0394 in) per year.

== See also ==
- List of earthquakes in Colombia
- Unguía Fault
- Romeral Fault System
