= Coiba plate =

Tectonic plate off the coast south of Panama and northwestern Colombia

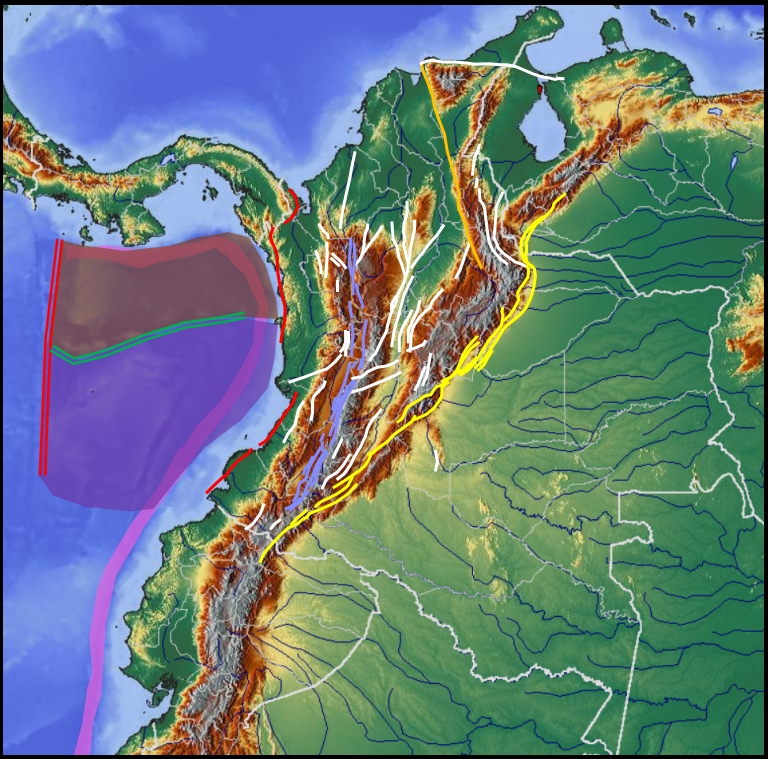
- Coiba plate in dark red, Malpelo plate in purple CTF in green, PTF in red
- Type: Micro
- Coordinates: 06°41′N 80°04′W
- Movement^{1}: East
- Features: Bordering: Panama plate (north); North Andes plate (east); Malpelo plate (south); Cocos plate (west); Basins: Chocó Offshore Basin; Colombian Deep Pacific Basin
- ^{1}Relative to the African plate

The Coiba plate is a small tectonic plate (microplate) located off the coasts south of Panama and northwestern Colombia. It is named after Coiba, the largest island of Central America, just north of the plate offshore southern Panama. It is bounded on the west by the Cocos plate, on the south by the Malpelo plate, on the east by the North Andes plate, and on the north by the Panama plate. This microplate was previously assumed to be part of the Nazca Plate, forming the northeastern tongue of the Nazca plate together with the Malpelo plate. Bordering the Coiba plate on the east are the north–south striking Bahía Solano Fault and east of that, the Serranía de Baudó, an isolated mountain chain in northwestern Chocó, Colombia.

== Description ==
The Coiba plate was identified as early as 1981 by Pennington, and later in 1988 by Adamek et al. It is named after Coiba, to the south of mainland Panama, bordering the plate. It was presented together with the newly defined Malpelo plate by Tuo Zhang and lead-researcher Richard G. Gordon et al. of Rice University in a paper published in August 2017. The Coiba transform fault (CTF) separates the Coiba plate from the Malpelo plate. The slab tear between the microplates could have happened during the fragmentation of the Farallon plate, in the Oligocene, around 30 to 25 Ma. The Coiba Ridge, a submerged part of the plate probably formed at the Galápagos hotspot, in contrast with the Malpelo Ridge, a product of volcanic activity.

The researchers led by Gordon used a Columbia University database of multibeam sonar soundings west of Ecuador and Colombia to identify a diffuse plate boundary that runs from the Panama transform fault (PTF) eastward.

== Gallery ==
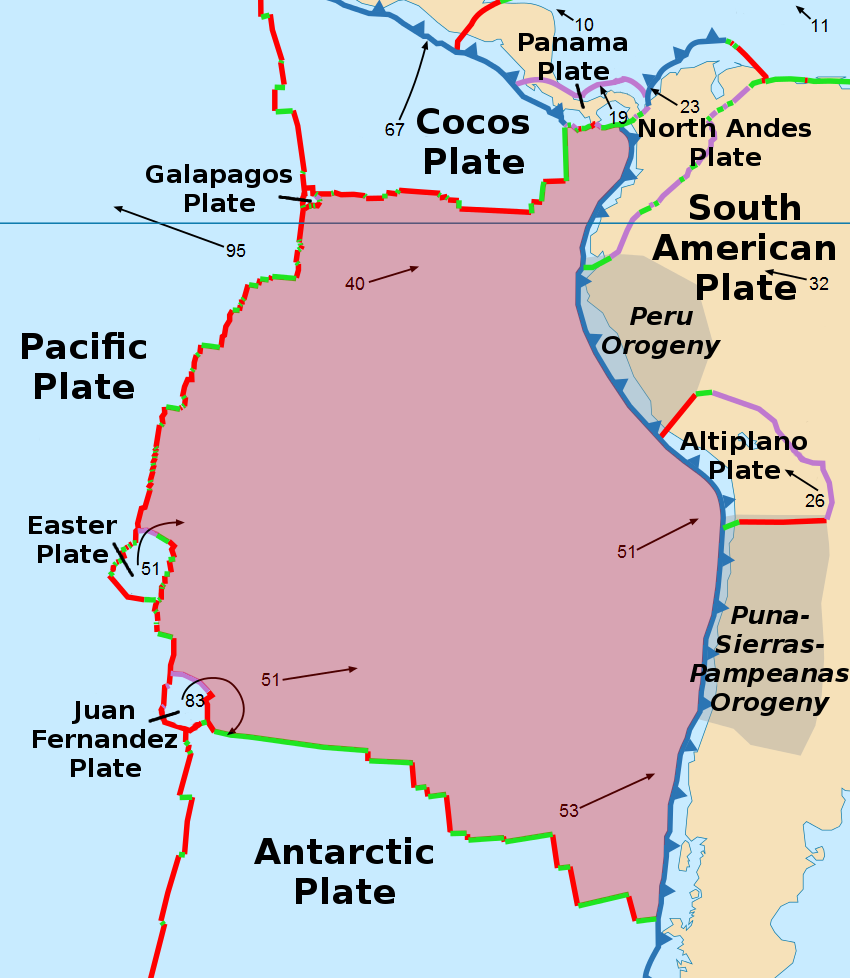
Former plate boundaries in the Pacific, offshore western South America

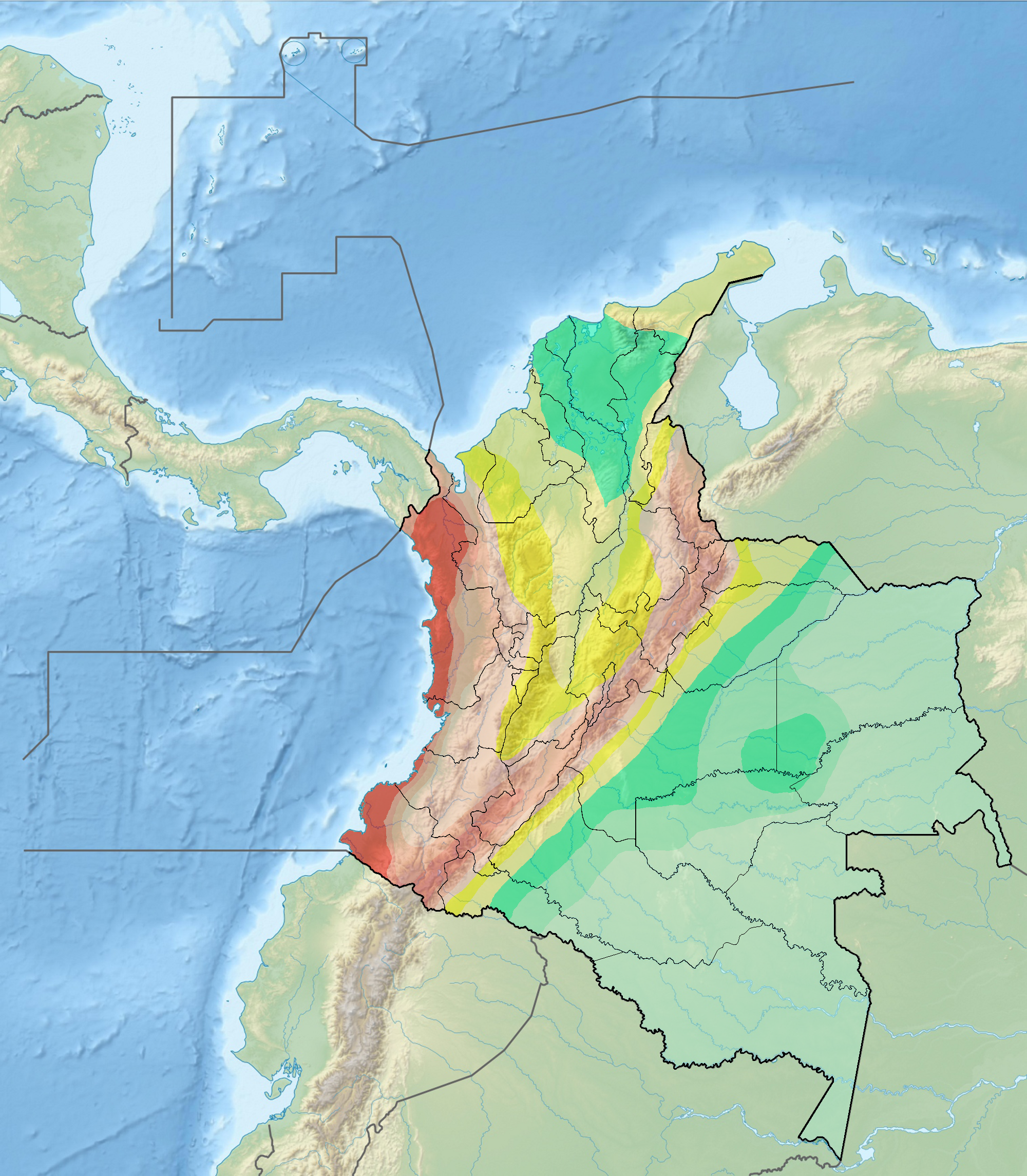
Seismic activity map of Colombia

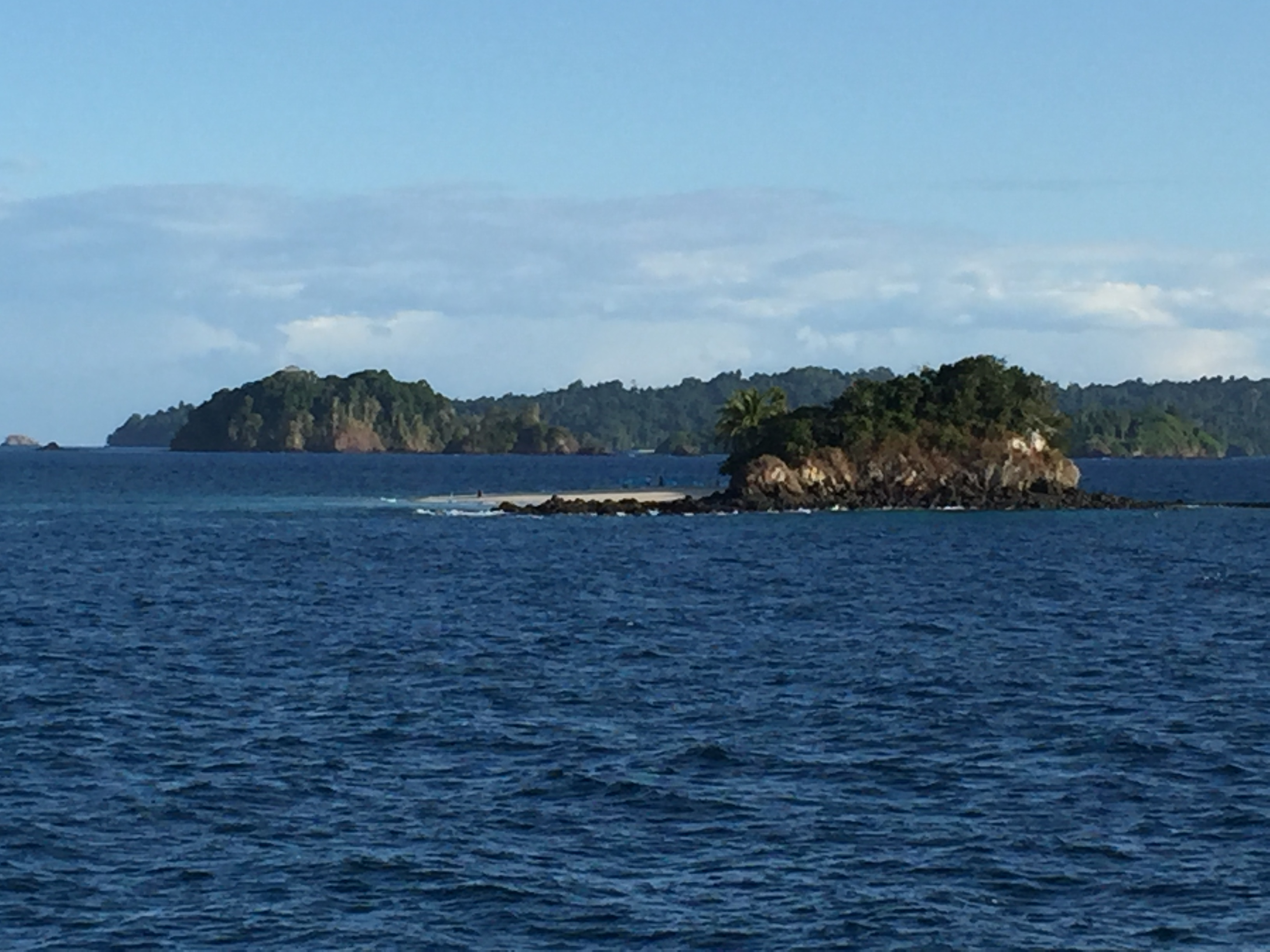
Coiba, namesake of the plate
