= List of earthquakes in 1967 =

Earthquakes in 1967
Approximate epicenters of notable earthquakes in 1967
- 4.0–5.9 magnitude
- 6.0–6.9 magnitude
- 7.0–7.9 magnitude
- 8.0+ magnitude
- Strongest: Turkey, Sakarya Province (Magnitude 7.4) July 22
- Deadliest: Venezuela, offshore Vargas (state) (Magnitude 6.6) July 29, 300 deaths
- Total fatalities: 961

Number by magnitude
- 9.0+: 0

This is a list of earthquakes in 1967. Only magnitude 6.0 or greater earthquakes appear on the list. Lower magnitude events are included if they have caused death, injury or damage. Events which occurred in remote areas will be excluded from the list as they wouldn't have generated significant media interest. All dates are listed according to UTC time. Maximum intensities are indicated on the Mercalli intensity scale and are sourced from United States Geological Survey (USGS) ShakeMap data.

Another year which had below normal activity. There were 11 magnitude 7.0+ events the largest of which measured 7.4. This event which struck Turkey in July was part of a series of earthquakes across the globe which made up the bulk of the death toll of 961. Turkey itself had two destructive events within days however Venezuela had the highest death toll with 300 of the year's fatalities. India was struck by a large earthquake in December which caused 180 deaths.

== Overall ==
=== By death toll ===
Rank	Death toll	Magnitude	Location	MMI	Depth (km)	Date
1	300	6.6	Venezuela, offshore Vargas (state)	IX (Violent)	25.0	July 30
2	180	6.6	India, Maharashtra	VIII (Severe)	15.0	December 10
3	98	7.0	Colombia, Caqueta Department	X (Extreme)	55.0	February 9
4	97	6.2	Turkey, Erzincan Province	VII (Very strong)	20.0	July 26
5	86	7.4	Turkey, Sakarya Province	X (Extreme)	30.0	July 22
6	71	5.5	Indonesia, off the west coast of Sulawesi	VIII (Severe)	33.0	April 11
7	54	6.3	Indonesia, south of Java	IX (Violent)	80.0	February 19
8	20	6.8	Colombia, Santander Department	V (Moderate)	161.2	July 29
9	18	6.7	Albania, Diber County	X (Extreme)	20.0	November 30
10	14	6.7	Indonesia, northern Sumatra	VII (Very strong)	50.0	April 12
11	10	5.0	Algeria, Mascara Province	( )	0.0	July 13

- Note: At least 10 casualties

=== By magnitude ===
Rank	Magnitude	Death toll	Location	MMI	Depth (km)	Date
1	7.4	86	Turkey, Sakarya Province	X (Extreme)	30.0	July 22
2	7.3	1	Chile, Antofagasta Region	VIII (Severe)	45.0	December 21
= 3	7.2	0	United Kingdom, Fiji	( )	636.8	October 9
= 3	7.2	0	Australia, west of Bougainville Island, Papua and New Guinea	VI (Strong)	35.0	December 25
4	7.1	0	Nicaragua, Lake Nicaragua	VI (Strong)	160.4	October 15
= 5	7.0	0	Mongolia, Bulgan Province	X (Extreme)	13.2	January 5
= 5	7.0	98	Colombia, Caqueta Department	VIII (Severe)	55.0	February 9
= 5	7.0	0	Reykjanes Ridge	( )	10.0	February 13
= 5	7.0	0	Brazil, Acre (state)	( )	600.4	February 15
= 5	7.0	0	Peru, off the coast of	( )	15.0	September 3
= 5	7.0	0	New Zealand, Auckland Islands	( )	20.0	September 20

- Note: At least 7.0 magnitude

== Notable events ==
=== January ===
January
- Strongest: 7.0 M_{w} Mongolia
- Total fatalities: 0

Number by magnitude
- 8.0–8.9: 0
- 7.0–7.9: 1
- 6.0–6.9: 10
- 5.0–5.9: 1

Date	Country and location	M_{w}	Depth (km)	MMI	Notes	Casualties	
Date	Country and location	M_{w}	Depth (km)	MMI	Notes	Dead	Injured
1	Tonga	6.5	30.0				
3	United Kingdom, Santa Cruz Islands, Solomon Islands	6.1	30.0	VII	Aftershock of events from December 31, 1966.		
5	Mongolia, Bulgan Province	7.0	13.2	X	Some damage was caused.		
11	Iran, Kermanshah Province	6.1	35.0	VI			
13	United Kingdom, Solomon Islands	6.2	40.0	VII			
16	United Kingdom, Santa Cruz Islands, Solomon Islands	6.0	30.0		Aftershock of event from December 31, 1966		
17	Argentina, Santiago del Estero Province	6.2	590.9				
17	Japan, off the east coast of Honshu	6.6	45.8	V			
20	Mongolia, Bulgan Province	6.4	20.0	VIII	Aftershock.		
24	China, Sichuan Province	5.5	0.0	VII	417 homes were destroyed. Unknown depth.		
25	Soviet Union, Gorno-Badakhshan Autonomous Region, Tajikistan	6.0	273.2	III			
28	United States, Fox Islands (Alaska)	6.8	35.0				

=== February ===
February
- Strongest: 7.0 M_{w} 3 events
- Deadliest: 7.0 M_{w} Colombia; 98 deaths
- Total fatalities: 152

Number by magnitude
- 8.0–8.9: 0
- 7.0–7.9: 3
- 6.0–6.9: 4
- 5.0–5.9: 1

Date	Country and location	M_{w}	Depth (km)	MMI	Notes	Casualties	
Date	Country and location	M_{w}	Depth (km)	MMI	Notes	Dead	Injured
9	Albania, Gjirokaster County	5.6	33.0		77 homes were destroyed.		
9	Colombia, Caqueta Department	7.0	55.0	X	98 people were killed in the 1967 Neiva earthquake. Property damage was extensive with costs being $20 million (1967 rate).	98	
13	Reykjanes Ridge	7.0	10.0				
14	Andaman Sea	6.8	30.0				
15	Brazil, Acre (state)	7.0	600.4				
17	Tonga	6.5	15.0				
19	Indonesia, south of Java	6.3	80.0	IX	54 people were killed and 300 were injured. 2,000 homes were destroyed and another 5,000 were damaged.	54	300
23	Japan, Ryukyu Islands	6.0	31.9				

=== March ===
March
- Strongest: 6.7 M_{w} 2 events
- Total fatalities: 0

Number by magnitude
- 8.0–8.9: 0
- 7.0–7.9: 0
- 6.0–6.9: 6

Date	Country and location	M_{w}	Depth (km)	MMI	Notes	Casualties	
Date	Country and location	M_{w}	Depth (km)	MMI	Notes	Dead	Injured
2	Ecuador, Pichincha Province	6.0	118.9	IV			
4	Greece, Aegean Sea	6.6	15.0	VII			
19	Soviet Union, Kuril Islands, Russia	6.7	40.0	IV			
24	Indonesia, Java Sea	6.7	598.0	II			
27	China, Hebei Province	6.1	29.7	VII	Widespread destruction was caused with the loss of 53,886 homes.		
27	New Hebrides, Vanuatu	6.4	15.0	VII			

=== April ===
April
- Strongest: 6.7 M_{w} Indonesia
- Deadliest: 5.5 M_{w} Indonesia; 71 deaths
- Total fatalities: 85

Number by magnitude
- 8.0–8.9: 0
- 7.0–7.9: 0
- 6.0–6.9: 3
- 5.0–5.9: 1

Date	Country and location	M_{w}	Depth (km)	MMI	Notes	Casualties	
Date	Country and location	M_{w}	Depth (km)	MMI	Notes	Dead	Injured
9	Indonesia, Papua (province)	6.0	15.0	VI			
10	United Kingdom, Solomon Islands	6.1	35.0	VI			
11	Indonesia, off the west coast of Sulawesi	5.5	33.0	VIII	Although a moderate magnitude, this event caused major damage in the area. 58 people were killed in the earthquake and a further 13 deaths were caused by a tsunami. 100 people were injured.	71	100
12	Indonesia, northern Sumatra	6.7	50.0	VII	14 people were killed and major damage was caused. 2,000 homes were destroyed.	14	

=== May ===
May
- Strongest: 6.7 M_{w} Indonesia
- Deadliest: 6.2 M_{w} Greece; 9 deaths
- Total fatalities: 9

Number by magnitude
- 8.0–8.9: 0
- 7.0–7.9: 0
- 6.0–6.9: 3

Date	Country and location	M_{w}	Depth (km)	MMI	Notes	Casualties	
Date	Country and location	M_{w}	Depth (km)	MMI	Notes	Dead	Injured
1	Greece, Thessaly	6.2	25.0	VII	9 people were killed and major damage was caused. Costs were $5 million (1967 rate).	9	
11	Chile, Tarapaca Region	6.1	109.4	V			
21	Indonesia, southern Sumatra	6.7	179.3	V			

=== June ===
June
- Strongest: 6.2 M_{w} 2 events
- Total fatalities: 0

Number by magnitude
- 8.0–8.9: 0
- 7.0–7.9: 0
- 6.0–6.9: 2

Date	Country and location	M_{w}	Depth (km)	MMI	Notes	Casualties	
Date	Country and location	M_{w}	Depth (km)	MMI	Notes	Dead	Injured
14	Tonga	6.2	29.6				
21	Chile, Antofagasta Region	6.2	35.0	VI			

=== July ===
July
- Strongest: 7.4 M_{w} Turkey
- Deadliest: 6.6 M_{w} Venezuela; 300 deaths
- Total fatalities: 513

Number by magnitude
- 8.0–8.9: 0
- 7.0–7.9: 1
- 6.0–6.9: 7
- 5.0–5.9: 1

Date	Country and location	M_{w}	Depth (km)	MMI	Notes	Casualties	
Date	Country and location	M_{w}	Depth (km)	MMI	Notes	Dead	Injured
1	United States, south of Alaska	6.5	27.5	IV			
6	United States, Fox Islands (Alaska)	6.1	27.3				
13	Algeria, Mascara Province	5.0	0.0		10 people were killed and 15 were injured. 40 homes were destroyed.	10	15
16	Indonesia, West Papua (province)	6.2	30.0	VI			
20	United States, Palau	6.4	20.0	V			
22	Turkey, Sakarya Province	7.4	30.0	X	86 people were killed in the 1967 Mudurnu earthquake. Property damage costs were $3 million (1967 rate).	86	
26	Turkey, Erzincan Province	6.2	20.0	VII	97 people were killed and major damage was caused. This came only days after a larger event to the west.	97	
29	Colombia, Santander Department	6.8	161.2	V	20 people were killed and major damage was caused.	20	
29	Venezuela, offshore Vargas (state)	6.6	25.0	IX	The 1967 Caracas earthquake left 300 dead and 1,536 injured. Major destruction was caused in the area with costs being $140 million (1967 rate).	300	1,536

=== August ===
August
- Strongest: 6.7 M_{w} United Kingdom, Fiji
- Deadliest: 5.7 M_{w} France; 1 death
- Total fatalities: 1

Number by magnitude
- 8.0–8.9: 0
- 7.0–7.9: 0
- 6.0–6.9: 6
- 5.0–5.9: 1

Date	Country and location	M_{w}	Depth (km)	MMI	Notes	Casualties	
Date	Country and location	M_{w}	Depth (km)	MMI	Notes	Dead	Injured
12	United Kingdom, south of Fiji	6.7	143.6				
13	Japan, Kyoto Prefecture, Honshu	6.3	364.3	III			
13	France, Nouvelle-Aquitaine	5.7	10.0	VIII	1 person died and 80 were injured. Many homes were destroyed.	1	80
13	Australia, off the east coast of New Britain, Papua and New Guinea	6.3	20.0	VI	Major damage was reported.		
19	Philippines, off the northeast coast of Mindanao	6.0	35.0	V			
21	Indonesia, off the west coast of Sumatra	6.6	39.1	V			
30	China, Sichuan Province	6.4	10.0	IX	Many homes were destroyed.		

=== September ===
September
- Strongest: 7.0 M_{w} 2 events
- Total fatalities: 0

Number by magnitude
- 8.0–8.9: 0
- 7.0–7.9: 2
- 6.0–6.9: 4

Date	Country and location	M_{w}	Depth (km)	MMI	Notes	Casualties	
Date	Country and location	M_{w}	Depth (km)	MMI	Notes	Dead	Injured
3	Peru, off the coast of	7.0	15.0				
4	New Zealand, Kermadec Islands	6.5	236.1				
9	Argentina, Santiago del Estero Province	6.7	580.4				
19	Japan, off the east coast of Hokkaido	6.1	80.0	V			
20	New Zealand, Auckland Islands	7.0	20.0				
26	Chile, off the coast of Coquimbo Region	6.2	50.0	VI			

=== October ===
October
- Strongest: 7.2 M_{w} United Kingdom, Fiji
- Deadliest: 6.8 M_{w} Taiwan; 2 deaths
- Total fatalities: 2

Number by magnitude
- 8.0–8.9: 0
- 7.0–7.9: 2
- 6.0–6.9: 3

Date	Country and location	M_{w}	Depth (km)	MMI	Notes	Casualties	
Date	Country and location	M_{w}	Depth (km)	MMI	Notes	Dead	Injured
3	Costa Rica, off the west coast	6.2	30.0	VI			
4	Australia, west of Bougainville Island, Papua and New Guinea	6.8	25.0	V			
9	United Kingdom, Fiji	7.2	636.8				
15	Nicaragua, Lake Nicaragua	7.1	160.4	VI			
25	Taiwan, off the east coast	6.8	71.1	VII	2 people were killed and 23 homes were destroyed.	2	

=== November ===
November
- Strongest: 6.7 M_{w} 2 events
- Deadliest: 6.7 M_{w} Albania, Albania; 18 deaths
- Total fatalities: 18

Number by magnitude
- 8.0–8.9: 0
- 7.0–7.9: 0
- 6.0–6.9: 6

Date	Country and location	M_{w}	Depth (km)	MMI	Notes	Casualties	
Date	Country and location	M_{w}	Depth (km)	MMI	Notes	Dead	Injured
4	Japan, off the east coast of Honshu	6.0	35.0				
4	Japan, Hokkaido	6.7	30.0	VII			
4	Ecuador, Morona-Santiago Province	6.1	93.7	V			
15	Chile, Atacama Region	6.3	34.8	VI			
23	Gulf of Aden	6.5	11.9				
30	Albania, Diber County	6.7	20.0	X	18 people were killed. Damage was extensive with costs reaching $20 million (1967 rate).	18	

=== December ===
December
- Strongest: 7.3 M_{w} Chile
- Deadliest: 6.6 M_{w} India; 180 deaths
- Total fatalities: 181

Number by magnitude
- 8.0–8.9: 0
- 7.0–7.9: 2
- 6.0–6.9: 8
- 5.0–5.9: 2

Date	Country and location	M_{w}	Depth (km)	MMI	Notes	Casualties	
Date	Country and location	M_{w}	Depth (km)	MMI	Notes	Dead	Injured
2	China, Hebei Province	5.7	25.0	VII	Some homes were destroyed.		
10	India, Maharashtra	6.6	15.0	VIII	180 people were killed and 2,000 were injured in the 1967 Koynanagar earthquake. Some damage was caused in the area. Costs were around $400,000 (1967 rate). This is an example of an earthquake possibly caused by human activity.	180	2,000
16	Soviet Union, off the east coast of Kamchatka, Russia	6.0	50.0				
18	China, Shanxi Province	5.4	30.0	VI	Some homes were destroyed.		
21	Chile, Antofagasta Region	7.3	45.0	VIII	1 person was killed and at least 101 were injured. Some homes collapsed.	1	101+
24	United Kingdom, east of Antigua and Barbuda	6.4	15.0				
24	United Kingdom, east of Antigua and Barbuda	6.2	15.0		Aftershock.		
25	Australia, west of Bougainville Island, Papua and New Guinea	7.2	35.0	VI			
25	Chile, off the coast of Antofagasta Region	6.3	46.4	VI	Aftershock.		
27	Chile, Antofagasta Region	6.7	114.7	VII	To the east of the December 21 event.		
27	Tonga	6.5	15.0				
