= Paratebueno =

Municipality and town in Colombia

- Municipality and town
- Flag Seal

- Location of the municipality and town of Gómez Plata in the Antioquia Department of Colombia

- Location in Colombia
- Coordinates: 4°22′31″N 73°12′47″W
- Country: Colombia
- Department: Cundinamarca

Population (2015)
  - Total: 7,726
- Time zone: UTC-5 (Colombia Standard Time)

Paratebueno is a municipality and town of Colombia in the department of Cundinamarca. It is 90 km (56 mi) outside the capital city of Bogotá.

== Population ==
There were 8,043 residents as of the 2018 census, updated November 2019.

== Earthquake ==
On June 8, 2025, Paratebueno was the epicenter of a 6.4 magnitude earthquake. Hundreds of homes, as well as multiple schools and churches, were damaged in the Santa Cecilia area of Paratebueno and in the nearby town of Medina.

== Climate ==
Paratebueno has a tropical monsoon climate (Köppen Am) with heavy to very heavy rainfall in all months except January.

Climate data for Paratebueno (Japon El), elevation 280 m (920 ft), (1981–2010)
Month	Jan	Feb	Mar	Apr	May	Jun	Jul	Aug	Sep	Oct	Nov	Dec	Year
Mean daily maximum °C (°F)	32.6 (90.7)	33.2 (91.8)	32.3 (90.1)	30.9 (87.6)	30.1 (86.2)	29.1 (84.4)	29.0 (84.2)	29.9 (85.8)	30.7 (87.3)	31.0 (87.8)	30.8 (87.4)	31.2 (88.2)	30.9 (87.6)
Daily mean °C (°F)	27.3 (81.1)	27.8 (82.0)	27.3 (81.1)	26.1 (79.0)	25.5 (77.9)	24.8 (76.6)	24.4 (75.9)	25.1 (77.2)	25.7 (78.3)	26.0 (78.8)	26.1 (79.0)	26.6 (79.9)	26.1 (79.0)
Mean daily minimum °C (°F)	21.6 (70.9)	22.1 (71.8)	22.5 (72.5)	22.0 (71.6)	21.8 (71.2)	21.5 (70.7)	21.1 (70.0)	21.3 (70.3)	21.6 (70.9)	21.7 (71.1)	22.0 (71.6)	21.8 (71.2)	21.7 (71.1)
Average precipitation mm (inches)	51.6 (2.03)	102.5 (4.04)	170.8 (6.72)	450.6 (17.74)	560.1 (22.05)	482.1 (18.98)	446.2 (17.57)	346.0 (13.62)	338.2 (13.31)	418.6 (16.48)	328.0 (12.91)	119.4 (4.70)	3,753.2 (147.76)
Average precipitation days	5	7	12	21	25	25	25	22	19	20	18	10	203
Average relative humidity (%)	69	67	72	80	83	85	84	82	80	80	80	76	78
Mean monthly sunshine hours	173.6	141.2	111.6	99.0	108.5	93.0	108.5	127.1	150.0	155.0	144.0	161.2	1,572.7
Mean daily sunshine hours	5.6	5.0	3.6	3.3	3.5	3.1	3.5	4.1	5.0	5.0	4.8	5.2	4.3
Source: Instituto de Hidrologia Meteorologia y Estudios Ambientales
