= Aratoca =

Coordinates: 6°42′N 73°01′W

- Municipality and town
- Flag Coat of arms

- Location of the municipality and town of Aratoca in the Santander Department of Colombia.
- Country: Colombia
- Department: Santander Department
- Time zone: UTC-5 (Colombia Standard Time)
- Climate: Am

Aratoca is a town and municipality in the Santander Department in northcentral Colombia.
