= Irlanda Fault =

- Falla Irlanda
- Location within Colombia
- Etymology: Vereda Irlanda, Popayán
- Coordinates: 02°55′01″N 76°03′25″W
- Country: Colombia
- Region: Andean
- State: Cauca, Huila
- Cities: Popayán

Characteristics
- Range: Central Ranges, Andes
- Part of: Andean strike-slip faults
- Length: 54.6 km (33.9 mi)
- Strike: 023.9 ± 4
- Dip: Vertical
- Dip angle: 90
- Displacement: <0.2 mm (0.0079 in)/yr

Tectonics
- Plate: North Andean
- Status: Active
- Earthquakes: 1994 Páez River (M_{w} 6.8)
- Type: Strike-slip fault
- Movement: Dextral
- Age: Quaternary
- Orogeny: Andean

The Irlanda Fault (Spanish: Falla Irlanda) is a dextral strike-slip fault in the department of Cauca in south-central Colombia. A small portion of the fault runs through Huila. The fault has a total length of 54.6 kilometres (33.9 mi) and runs along an average northeast to southwest strike of 023 ± 4 in the Central Ranges of the Colombian Andes. The fault is active and associated with the deadly 1994 Páez River earthquake.

== Etymology ==
The fault is named after vereda Irlanda of Popayán, Cauca.

== Description ==
The Irlanda Fault extends through the axis of the Central Ranges, east of the city of Popayán. It cuts igneous and metamorphic rocks that are capped with Quaternary volcanic ash and lapilli. The Irlanda Fault consists of two en-echelon strands. The fault trace has medium geomorphic expression and, although somewhat obscure, there are offset spurs, degraded fault scarps, broad fault valleys, saddles, aligned drainage, and deflected streams. The fault runs east of the Puracé volcano and south of the Nevado del Huila.

=== Activity ===
The fault has been estimated as being responsible for the 1994 Páez River earthquake, occurring on June 6, 1994. The earthquake happened at a depth of 12 kilometres (39,000 ft) and had a moment magnitude of 6.8 and an intensity of VII. The earthquake destroyed the town of Páez and produced approximately 1100 fatalities. The Colombian Red Cross presented a figure of 28,000 people affected by the earthquake and the resulting landslides, mudflows, avalanches and isolation due to lacking communication.

== See also ==
- List of earthquakes in Colombia
- Bucaramanga-Santa Marta Fault
- Romeral Fault System
