= 1967 Neiva earthquake =

Earthquake in Colombia

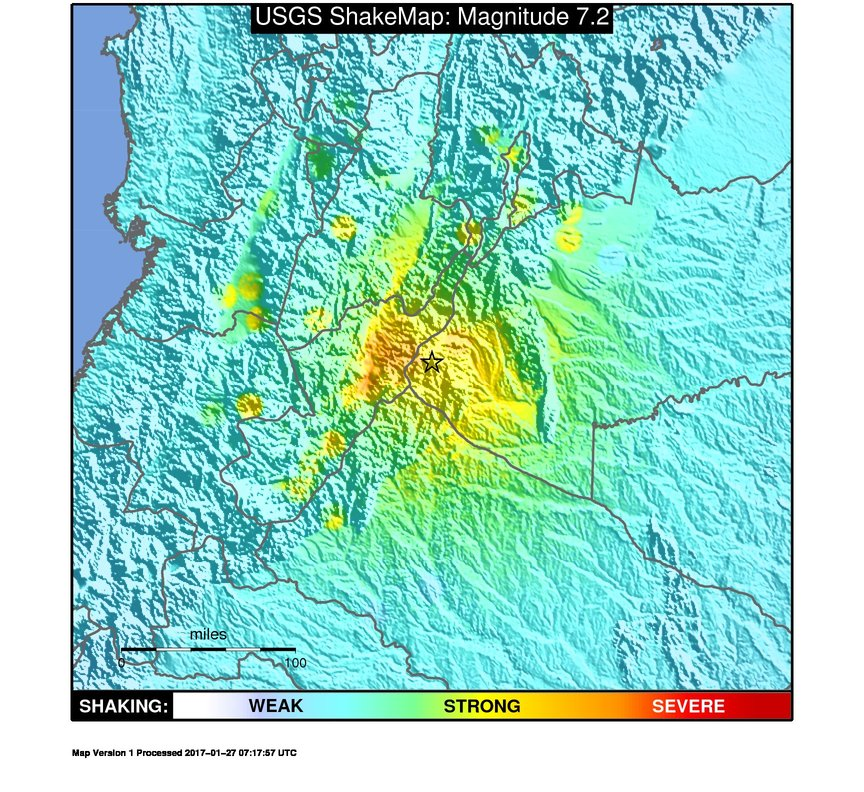
- ShakeMap for the 1967 Neiva earthquake

- Location within Colombia
- UTC time: 1967-02-09 15:24:49
- ISC event: 838623
- USGS-ANSS: ComCat
- Local date: February 9, 1967
- Local time: 10:24:49
- Magnitude: 7.0 M_{w}, 6.8 M_{L}
- Depth: 35.0 km (22 mi)
- Epicenter: 02°50′56.4″N 74°47′52.8″W
- Fault: Algeciras
- Areas affected: Huila, Tolima, Bogotá
- Total damage: 600,000 USD
- Max. intensity: MMI X (Extreme)
- Tsunami: No
- Aftershocks: 350
- Casualties: 98

The 1967 Neiva earthquake occurred at 10:24 local time (UTC-05) on February 9 in Colombia. The epicentre of the earthquake was located in San Vicente del Caguán in the department of Caquetá. The earthquake, associated with the Algeciras Fault, part of the megaregional Eastern Frontal Fault System, had a moment magnitude of 7.0 and an intensity of X and was felt in northwestern South America from Caracas to Iquitos and Buenaventura to Mitú. In the following months, 350 aftershocks were registered in the area. The earthquake produced 98 fatalities and approximately 600,000 USD in damage.

== Description ==
While the earthquake is commonly referred to as the Neiva earthquake, the epicentre was not located in Neiva as first reported, or Algeciras as later reports state, yet in San Vicente del Caguán in northern Caquetá. The earthquake had a moment magnitude of 7.0 and an intensity of VIII. The earthquake was felt from Caracas in Venezuela in the north to Iquitos in Peru in the south and from Buenaventura in southwestern Colombia in the west to Mitú, at the border with Brazil in the east. In the three days after the earthquake twenty aftershocks were felt and the seismological observation centre of Bogotá registered 350 aftershocks in the next month.

Activity of the Algeciras Fault, a dextral strike-slip fault and segment of the megaregional Eastern Frontal Fault System that forms the boundary between the North Andes and South American Plates, is associated with the earthquake. The earthquake manifested surface rupturing or cracking in the vicinity of El Paraíso, which is situated on the fault trace northeast of Algeciras.

=== Damage ===
The areas of Colombia, El Paraíso and Vegalarga were destroyed by the earthquake and Neiva and other populated areas in the north of Huila and south of Tolima notably affected. In Neiva, 15 fatalities were counted and 100,000 people were affected. Part of the church of Neiva collapsed. In the Colombian capital Bogotá, the tower of the San Juan de Dios Church collapsed as well as at least fifty walls as a result of the earthquake. A total damage of 600,000 USD was estimated as a result of the earthquake, of which 130,000,000 pesos in Huila alone.

== See also ==
- List of earthquakes in 1967
- List of earthquakes in Colombia
- 2008 El Calvario earthquake
