= Malpelo plate =

Small tectonic plate off the coasts of Ecuador and Colombia

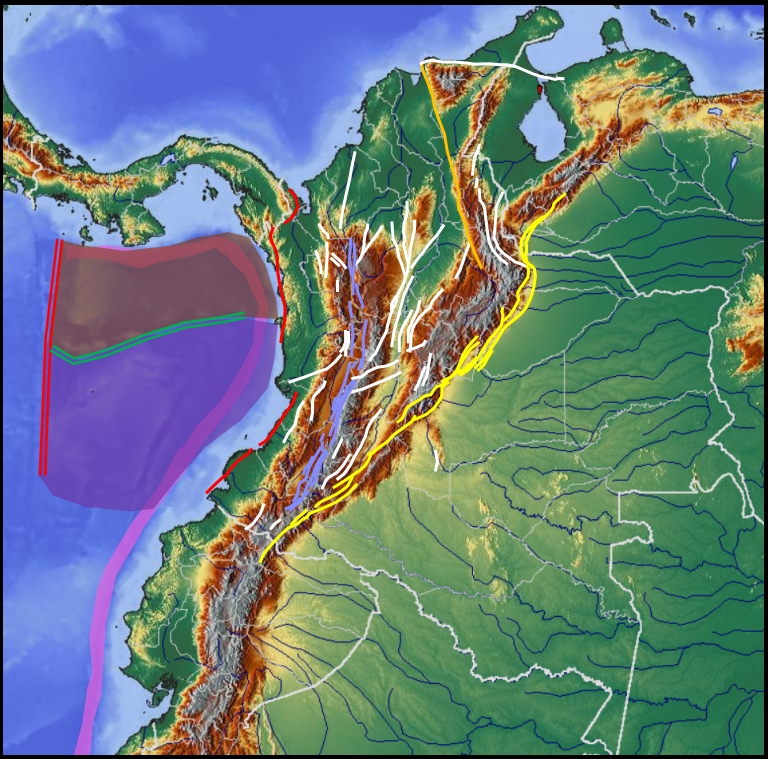
- Malpelo plate in purple, Coiba plate in dark red PTF in red, CTF in green
- Type: Micro
- Coordinates: 03°14′N 81°14′W
- Movement^{1}: East
- Features: Bordering: Coiba plate (north); North Andes plate (east); Nazca plate (south); Cocos plate (west); Basins: Chocó Offshore Basin; Colombian Deep Pacific Basin
- ^{1}Relative to the African plate

The Malpelo plate is a small tectonic plate (microplate) located off the coasts west of Ecuador and Colombia. It is the 57th plate to be identified. It is named after Colombia's Malpelo Island, the only emerged part of the plate. It is bounded on the west by the Cocos plate, on the south by the Nazca plate, on the east by the North Andes Plate, and on the north by the Coiba plate, separated by the Coiba transform fault (CTF). This microplate was previously assumed to be part of the Nazca plate. The Malpelo plate borders three major faults of Pacific Colombia, the north to south striking Bahía Solano Fault in the north and the Naya-Micay and Remolino-El Charco Faults in the south.

== Description ==
The Malpelo plate was hypothesised in 2013 and identified by a non-closure of the Nazca–Cocos–Pacific plate motion circuit, in a paper published in 2017. The formation of the oceanic crust of the plate has been estimated to be since the Middle Miocene (14.7 Ma).

The researchers used a Columbia University database of multibeam sonar soundings west of Ecuador and Colombia to identify a diffuse plate boundary that runs from the Panama transform fault (PTF) eastward to where the boundary intersects a deep oceanic trench just offshore of the South American coast, north of the Galapagos Islands.

== Gallery ==
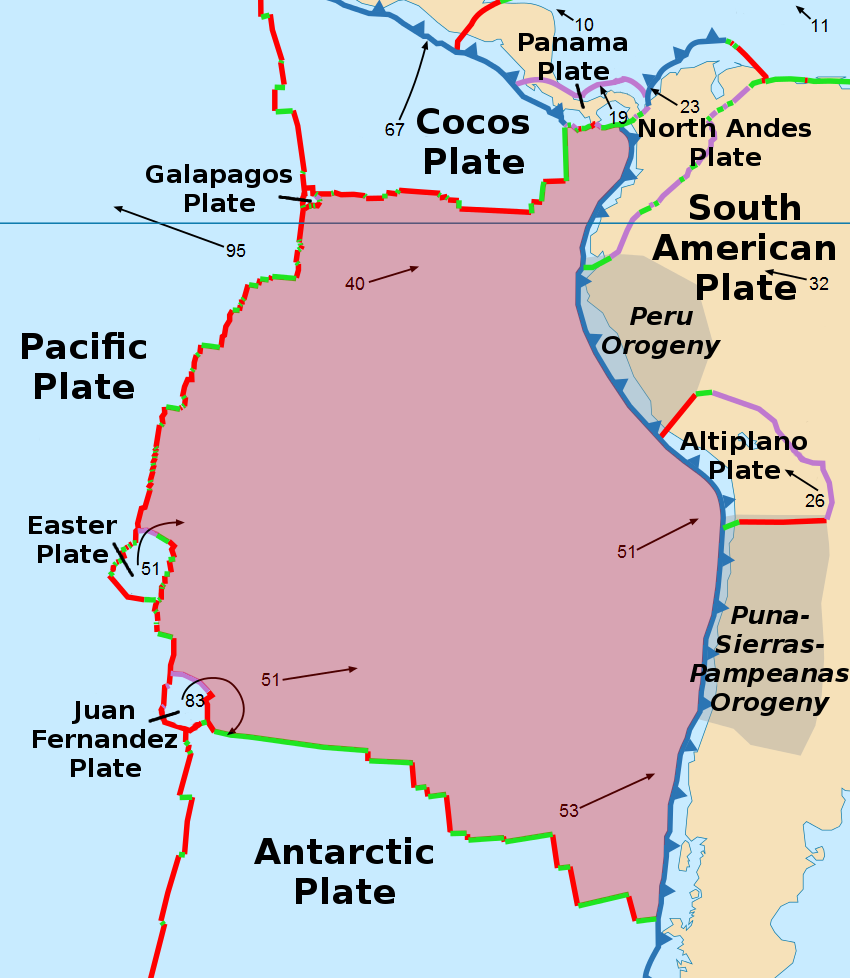
Former plate boundaries in the Pacific, offshore western South America

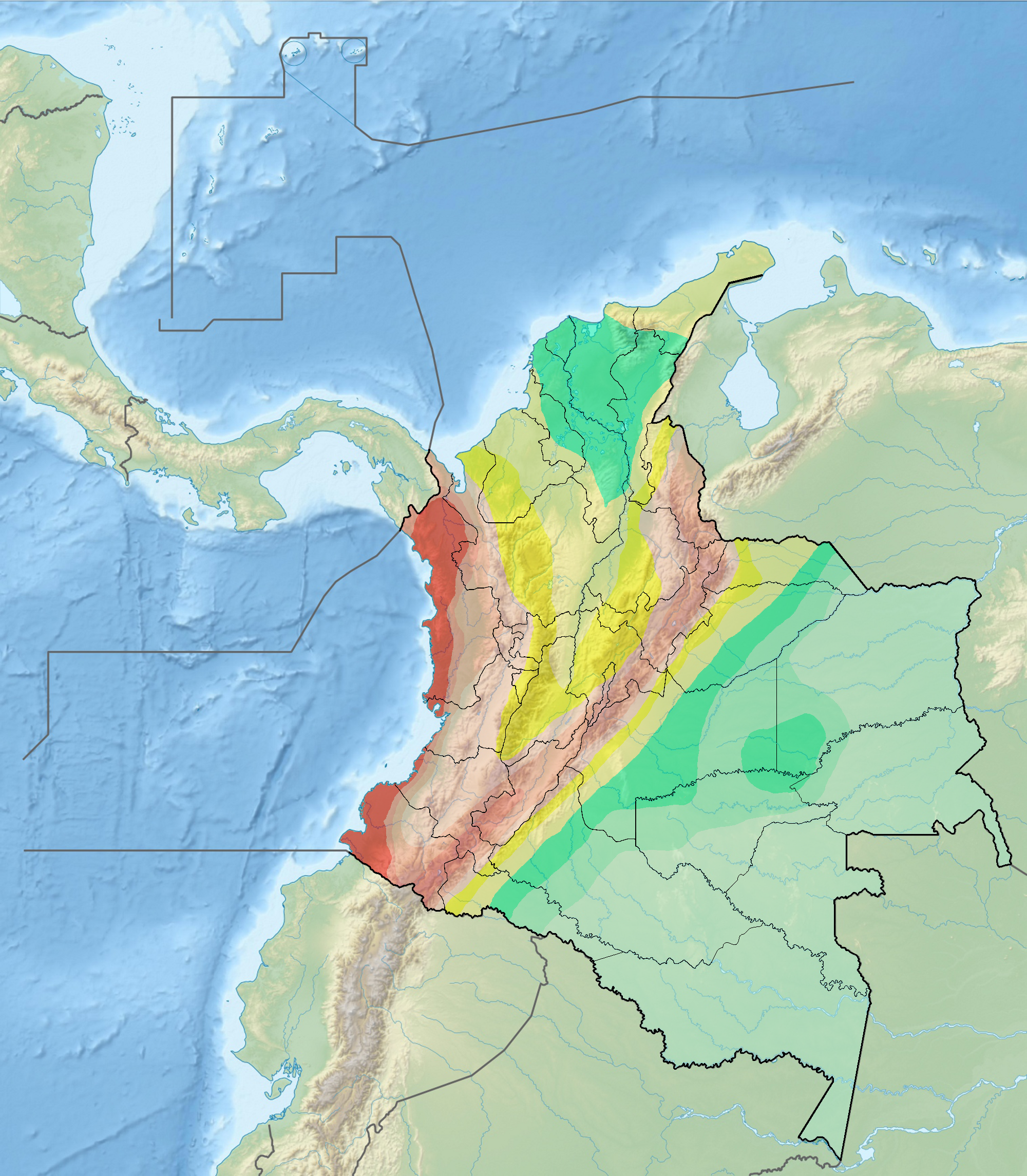
Seismic activity map of Colombia

Map of Malpelo Island, namesake of the plate

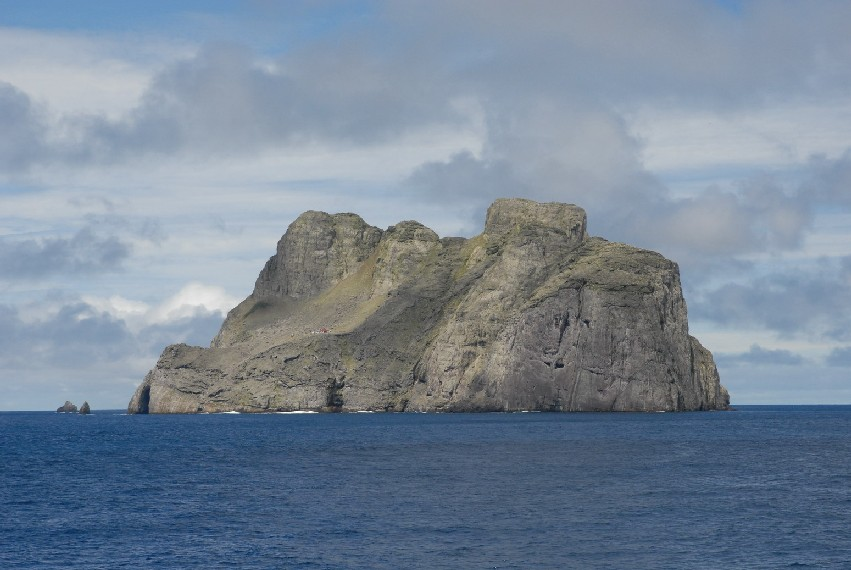
Malpelo Island, the only emerged section of the plate
