= Barranca de Upía =

Coordinates: 4°35′N 72°58′W

- Municipality and town
- Flag Coat of arms

- Location of the municipality and town of Barranca de Upía in the Meta Department of Colombia.

- Location in Colombia
- Country: Colombia
- Department: Meta Department

Area
  - Municipality and town: 815 km^{2} (315 sq mi)
- Elevation: 200 m (660 ft)

Population (2015)
  - Municipality and town: 3,926
  - Urban: 2,858
- Time zone: UTC-5 (Colombia Standard Time)
- Climate: Am

Barranca de Upía is a town and municipality in the Meta Department, Colombia.

== Climate ==
Climate data for Barranca de Upía (Guaicaramo), elevation 190 m (620 ft), (1981–2010)
Month	Jan	Feb	Mar	Apr	May	Jun	Jul	Aug	Sep	Oct	Nov	Dec	Year
Mean daily maximum °C (°F)	33.5 (92.3)	33.9 (93.0)	33.4 (92.1)	31.6 (88.9)	30.6 (87.1)	29.8 (85.6)	29.7 (85.5)	30.6 (87.1)	31.2 (88.2)	31.6 (88.9)	31.6 (88.9)	32.3 (90.1)	31.7 (89.1)
Daily mean °C (°F)	27.4 (81.3)	27.7 (81.9)	27.5 (81.5)	26.6 (79.9)	26.2 (79.2)	25.7 (78.3)	25.5 (77.9)	25.9 (78.6)	26.6 (79.9)	26.7 (80.1)	26.6 (79.9)	27.1 (80.8)	26.6 (79.9)
Mean daily minimum °C (°F)	21.1 (70.0)	21.3 (70.3)	21.8 (71.2)	22.3 (72.1)	22.0 (71.6)	21.6 (70.9)	21.3 (70.3)	21.7 (71.1)	21.9 (71.4)	22.2 (72.0)	22.1 (71.8)	21.6 (70.9)	21.7 (71.1)
Average precipitation mm (inches)	23.4 (0.92)	50.8 (2.00)	139.8 (5.50)	279.2 (10.99)	418.4 (16.47)	345.9 (13.62)	269.4 (10.61)	240.2 (9.46)	272.7 (10.74)	277.0 (10.91)	171.7 (6.76)	50.0 (1.97)	2,495.2 (98.24)
Average precipitation days	2	6	10	17	22	20	19	17	15	15	11	4	152
Average relative humidity (%)	70	71	74	83	86	87	86	85	83	82	81	76	80
Mean monthly sunshine hours	226.3	192.0	148.8	126.0	130.2	126.0	133.3	145.7	171.0	189.1	189.0	213.9	1,991.3
Mean daily sunshine hours	7.3	6.8	4.8	4.2	4.2	4.2	4.3	4.7	5.7	6.1	6.3	6.9	5.5
Source: Instituto de Hidrologia Meteorologia y Estudios Ambientales
