= San Juanito, Meta =

Coordinates: 4.45861°N 73.6731°W

San Juanito
- Municipality and town
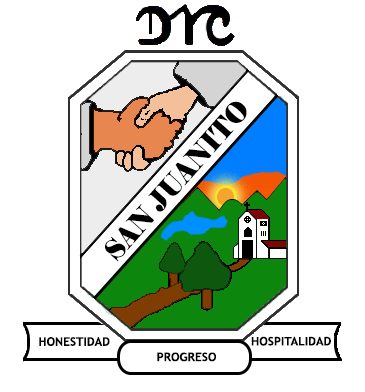
- Flag Coat of arms

- Location of the municipality and town of San Juanito in the Meta Department of Colombia.
- Country: Colombia
- Department: Meta Department

Area
  - Total: 162 km^{2} (63 sq mi)
- Elevation: 1,795 m (5,889 ft)
- Time zone: UTC-5 (Colombia Standard Time)
- Climate: Cfb

San Juanito is a town and municipality in the Meta Department, Colombia. San Juanito has an elevation of 2,018 metres. San Juanito is situated southwest of Vda. El Tablón, and south of Alto Buenavista.
