= Suaza =

Coordinates: 1°59′N 75°49′W

- Municipality and town
- Flag Coat of arms

- Location of the municipality and town of Suaza in the Huila Department of Colombia.
- Country: Colombia
- Department: Huila Department

Population (Census 2018)
  - Total: 17,376
- Time zone: UTC-5 (Colombia Standard Time)

Suaza (Spanish pronunciation: [ˈswasa]) is a town and municipality in the Huila Department, Colombia.

== Climate ==
Climate data for Suaza (Libano El), elevation 1,045 m (3,428 ft), (1981–2010)
Month	Jan	Feb	Mar	Apr	May	Jun	Jul	Aug	Sep	Oct	Nov	Dec	Year
Mean daily maximum °C (°F)	28.4 (83.1)	28.5 (83.3)	27.7 (81.9)	27.7 (81.9)	27.4 (81.3)	27.1 (80.8)	27.0 (80.6)	27.2 (81.0)	27.8 (82.0)	27.9 (82.2)	27.9 (82.2)	28.1 (82.6)	27.7 (81.9)
Daily mean °C (°F)	22.9 (73.2)	22.8 (73.0)	22.6 (72.7)	22.6 (72.7)	22.4 (72.3)	22.1 (71.8)	22.0 (71.6)	22.0 (71.6)	22.2 (72.0)	22.6 (72.7)	22.7 (72.9)	22.7 (72.9)	22.5 (72.5)
Mean daily minimum °C (°F)	17.1 (62.8)	17.1 (62.8)	17.3 (63.1)	17.3 (63.1)	17.3 (63.1)	17.1 (62.8)	16.9 (62.4)	16.9 (62.4)	16.7 (62.1)	17.0 (62.6)	17.2 (63.0)	17.0 (62.6)	17.1 (62.8)
Average precipitation mm (inches)	49.8 (1.96)	81.9 (3.22)	115.7 (4.56)	130.1 (5.12)	137.6 (5.42)	134.4 (5.29)	118.5 (4.67)	88.2 (3.47)	96.7 (3.81)	107.9 (4.25)	81.4 (3.20)	65.1 (2.56)	1,207.2 (47.53)
Average precipitation days	12	14	18	21	22	20	19	19	18	17	17	14	209
Average relative humidity (%)	80	81	81	82	82	83	83	82	80	81	81	82	82
Source: Instituto de Hidrologia Meteorologia y Estudios Ambientales
