= Yacuanquer =

Coordinates: 1°07′N 77°24′W

- Municipality and town
- Flag

- Location of the municipality and town of Yacuanquer in the Nariño Department of Colombia.
- Country: Colombia
- Department: Nariño Department

Area
  - Municipality and town: 111 km^{2} (43 sq mi)
- Elevation: 2,670 m (8,760 ft)

Population (Census 2018)
  - Municipality and town: 10,579
  - Density: 95.3/km^{2} (247/sq mi)
  - Urban: 2,815
- Time zone: UTC-5 (Colombia Standard Time)

Yacuanquer is a town and municipality in the Nariño Department, Colombia.

== Climate ==
Climate data for Yacuanquer/Tangua (Sindagua), elevation 2,800 m (9,200 ft), (1981–2010)
Month	Jan	Feb	Mar	Apr	May	Jun	Jul	Aug	Sep	Oct	Nov	Dec	Year
Mean daily maximum °C (°F)	17.2 (63.0)	17.4 (63.3)	17.4 (63.3)	17.6 (63.7)	17.5 (63.5)	17.4 (63.3)	17.3 (63.1)	17.7 (63.9)	18.3 (64.9)	18.0 (64.4)	17.0 (62.6)	16.9 (62.4)	17.5 (63.5)
Daily mean °C (°F)	13.1 (55.6)	13.2 (55.8)	13.2 (55.8)	13.3 (55.9)	13.3 (55.9)	13.1 (55.6)	12.9 (55.2)	13.1 (55.6)	13.3 (55.9)	13.3 (55.9)	12.9 (55.2)	13.0 (55.4)	13.1 (55.6)
Mean daily minimum °C (°F)	9.2 (48.6)	9.4 (48.9)	9.7 (49.5)	9.7 (49.5)	9.7 (49.5)	9.3 (48.7)	8.8 (47.8)	8.7 (47.7)	8.9 (48.0)	9.2 (48.6)	9.5 (49.1)	9.6 (49.3)	9.3 (48.7)
Average precipitation mm (inches)	91.3 (3.59)	83.5 (3.29)	91.0 (3.58)	113.7 (4.48)	94.1 (3.70)	50.9 (2.00)	29.4 (1.16)	22.5 (0.89)	50.8 (2.00)	111.6 (4.39)	137.8 (5.43)	112.4 (4.43)	989.0 (38.94)
Average precipitation days	20	18	23	24	24	19	15	12	15	19	24	23	235
Average relative humidity (%)	80	80	80	80	80	79	77	75	75	78	82	81	79
Mean monthly sunshine hours	120.9	101.6	96.1	99.0	114.7	123.0	158.1	158.1	135.0	127.1	114.0	117.8	1,465.4
Mean daily sunshine hours	3.9	3.6	3.1	3.3	3.7	4.1	5.1	5.1	4.5	4.1	3.8	3.8	4.0
Source: Instituto de Hidrologia Meteorologia y Estudios Ambientales
