= Eastern Frontal Fault System =

Fault system in South America

- Sistema de Fallas de la Falla Frontal de la Cordillera Oriental
- Location within Colombia
- Etymology: Eastern Ranges
- Coordinates: 04°12′03.5″N 73°40′46.7″W
- Country: Colombia
- Region: Andean, Amazon, Orinoquía
- State: Arauca, Boyacá, Caquetá, Casanare, Cauca, Cundinamarca, Huila, Meta, Nariño, Putumayo
- Cities: Florencia, Garzón, Mocoa, Villavicencio, Yopal

Characteristics
- Range: Eastern Ranges, Andes
- Part of: Andean megaregional fault systems
- Segments: Segments
- Length: 921.4 km (572.5 mi) (total); 1,821.8 km (1,132.0 mi) (cumulative)
- Strike: 042.1 ± 19
- Dip: West
- Dip angle: 30-40
- Displacement: <0.2 mm (0.0079 in)/yr

Tectonics
- Plate: North Andean, South American
- Status: Active
- Earthquakes: 1827 Timaná (M_{w} 7.7); 1834 Sibundoy (M_{w} 7.0); 1917 Sumapaz (M_{w} 7.3); 1967 Neiva (M_{w} 7.2); 1995 Tauramena (M_{w} 6.5); 2008 El Calvario (M_{w} 5.6)
- Type: Megaregional system of inverted Mesozoic normal faults into Cenozoic oblique and thrust faults
- Movement: Variable
- Age: Jurassic-Cretaceous (normal); Neogene (reversed); Quaternary (recent activity)
- Orogeny: Andean
- Volcanic arc/belt: North Volcanic Zone; Andean Volcanic Belt

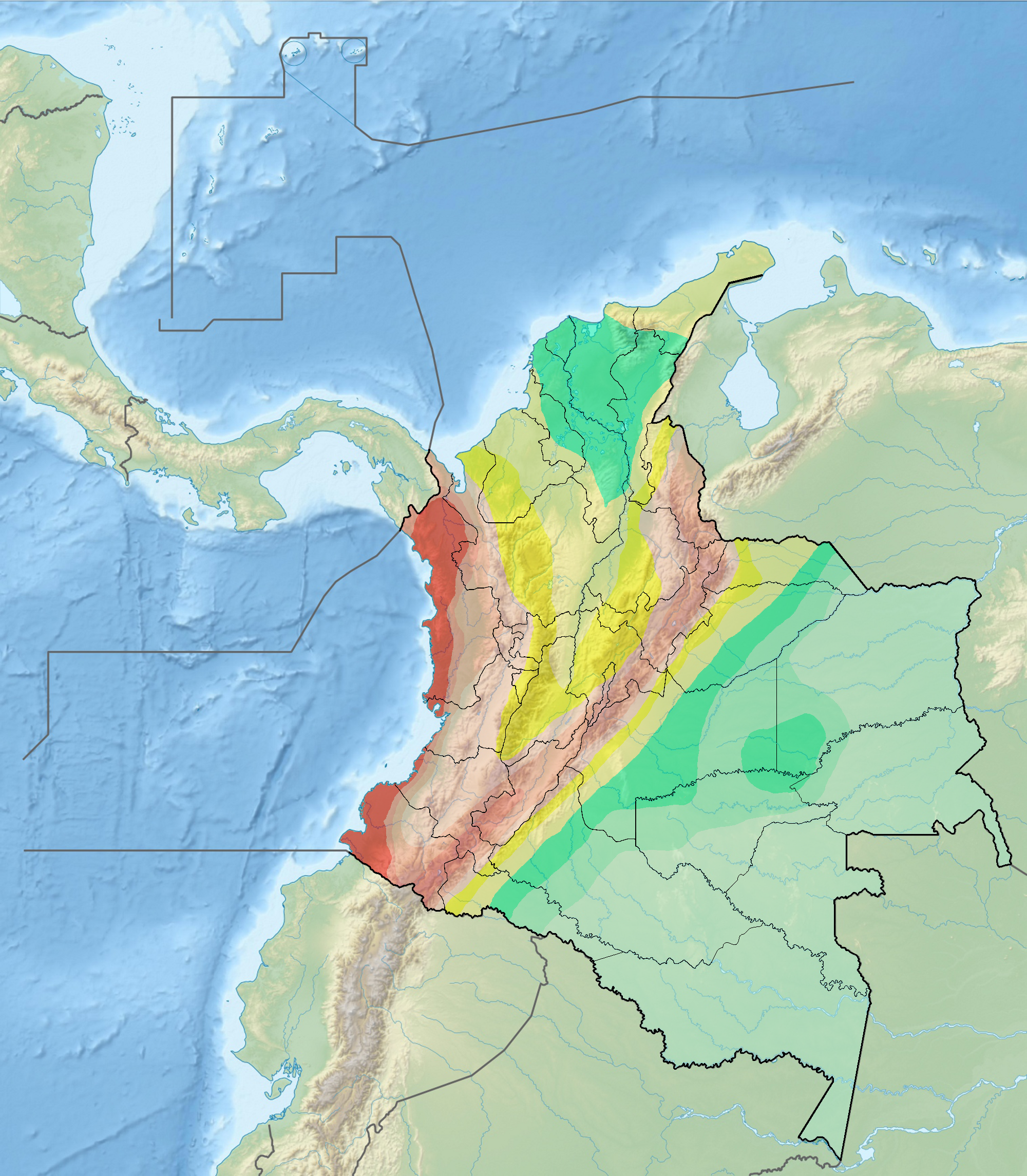
Seismic risk map of Colombia showing the Andean Eastern Frontal Fault System in light red along the yellow strip in the low-lying area to the east

The Eastern Frontal Fault System (Spanish: Sistema de Fallas de la Falla Frontal de la Cordillera Oriental) is a megaregional system of oblique and thrust faults cross-cutting Colombia from Ecuador in the south to Venezuela in the north. The system from south to north covers ten out of 32 departments of Colombia; Nariño, Putumayo, Cauca, Huila, Caquetá, Cundinamarca, Meta, Boyacá, Casanare and Arauca. The Eastern Frontal Fault System underlies and affects the capitals of Putumayo, Mocoa, Caquetá, Florencia, Meta, Villavicencio and Casanare, Yopal. The fault system has a total length of 921.4 kilometres (572.5 mi) with a cumulative length of the faults of 1,821.8 kilometres (1,132.0 mi) and runs along an average northeast to southwest strike of 042.1 ± 19 bordering and crossing the Eastern Ranges of the Colombian Andes. The fault system forms the boundary between the North Andes microplate and the South American Plate.

Several segments of the fault system are active, with major earthquakes occurring in historical times. The 1827 Timaná (M_{w} 7.7), 1834 Sibundoy (M_{w} 7.0), 1917 Sumapaz (M_{w} 7.3), 1967 Neiva (M_{w} 7.2), 1995 Tauramena (M_{w} 6.5) and 2008 El Calvario earthquakes (M_{w} 5.6) are associated with movement of the fault system.

== Etymology ==
The fault system is named after the Eastern Ranges, forming the front with the Llanos and Caguán-Putumayo Basins.

== Description ==
The Eastern Frontal Fault System is one of the most active and continuous fault systems in Colombia. Several names have been given to it according to where it has been studied along its length. Local common fault names or "sections" from north to south are the Guaicáramo, Yopal, San José, Servitá-Santa Maria, Guayuriba, Algeciras, Mocoa, Florencia and Afiladores Faults. Other less common names include the Pajarito, Colepato, Acacías, and Colonia Faults. The fault system is probably an extension of the Boconó Fault and associated faults of the Mérida Andes in Venezuela and likely continues south as a dextral fault in the Republic of Ecuador. The Eastern Frontal Fault System is the main fault system bounding the Andean Ranges in the west and the lowlands or Llanos Orientales plains in the east. This fault system extends all the way south to the Jambali Graben in the Gulf of Guayaquil in Ecuador. It is considered to be the actual plate boundary of the South American Plate disconnecting it from the North Andes Block. The Eastern Frontal Fault System extends from near latitude 3°N, north into the Venezuelan Andes, close to San Cristóbal at about latitude 7.5°N. The fault system developed from an initial set of parallel fractures (strike joints) arising from distensional forces. These dipped westwards, forming the eastern border of a huge Paleozoic to Cretaceous sedimentary basin. Later in the Neogene, regional uplift and shortening of the crust gave rise to the Eastern Ranges of Colombia. The initial normal faults reversed motion and became thrust faults in the Borde Llanero. The Guaicáramo Fault System deforms late Neogene deposits and is characterised by neotectonic morphology that is some of the most outstanding and continuous in the country.

=== Segments ===
The fault system is subdivided into multiple segments.

==== Guaicáramo Fault System ====
The Guaicáramo Fault System, which has an oblique sense of movement, with both reverse and right-lateral compnents of displacement, is composed of three segments, the northern Guaicáramo section of 145.5 kilometres (90.4 mi), the central Guaicáramo section of 121.9 kilometres (75.7 mi), and the southern Guaicáramo section of 75.9 kilometres (47.2 mi).

==== Yopal Fault ====
The 220.0 kilometres (136.7 mi) long Yopal Fault is the easternmost active geologic thrust fault known in northeastern Colombia. North of the city of Yopal, it places Neogene rocks on the west against Quaternary alluvial deposits of the Llanos Basin on the east.

==== San Pedro-Cumaral Fault ====
The 69.7 kilometres (43.3 mi) long San Pedro-Cumaral system is formed by the parallel San Pedro and Cumaral Faults. which have a reverse motion with a minor component of right-lateral movement. The faults form well defined fault scarps on Tertiary and Quaternary sedimentary rocks that form hilly landscapes, upwarping and tilting of terraces, deflected streams, linear fault ridges, and narrowing of streams on the eastern sides of the faults.

==== Servitá-Santa María Fault ====
The 295.8 kilometres (183.8 mi) long Servitá-Santa María Fault extends close to the east margin of the Eastern Colombian Ranges near the Guaicáramo Fault, east of Bogotá. The combined fault is grouped in a system because of their morphologic similarity, geometric characteristics and Quaternary activity and includes the Servitá Fault to the south and Santa María and San Pedro de Jagua Faults to the north. Thrusting of Paleozoic rocks over younger formations is seen along faults of this group. The faults offset Jurassic, Cretaceous and Tertiary strata and deform Quaternary strata.

==== Guayuriba Fault ====
The 131.0 kilometres (81.4 mi) long Guayuriba Fault, which has an oblique (reverse and right lateral) sense of movement, is located to the southeast of the Servitá-Santa María section. It lies south of and close to the city of Villavicencio, at the base of the eastern front of the Eastern Ranges, and extends along the change of slope between the uplifted range and the flat plains of the Llanos Basin.

==== Algeciras Fault ====
The 156.5 kilometres (97.2 mi) long right-lateral strike-slip Algeciras Fault crosses the southward narrowing Eastern Ranges at an oblique angle, with its southern extension following the western flank. The fault displaces Precambrian crystalline shield rocks and Mesozoic granites. Neotectonic deformation is suggested by the formation of a narrow and long pull-apart basin filled with Quaternary sediments. Younger faults cross the basin diagonally. The fault is part of a set of major strike-slip faults that farther north probably join the Guayuriba Fault, which borders the Eastern Ranges to the northeast.

==== Garzón-Pitalito Fault ====
The 125.5 kilometres (78.0 mi) long Garzón-Pitalito Fault, which probably has a right-lateral strike-slip sense of movement with some component of reverse faulting, extends along the western slope of the Eastern Ranges southeast from the city of Neiva and crosses the upper part of the Magdalena Valley. In the northern half, the fault places Jurassic to Triassic sedimentary rocks on the eastern side in contact with Quaternary alluvium and colluvium on the western side. Along its southern half, the fault places Jurassic-Triassic rocks in contact with Cretaceous rocks. The Garzón-Pitalito Fault strikes toward and merges with the Algeciras Fault to the north. To the south, it passes the towns of Garzón, Altamira, Timaná, Pitalito and San Agustín. In Pitalito, it creates a pull-apart basin. The fault appears to dextrally displace the Suaza Fault. The place of the offset is marked by a large shutter ridge near where the Suaza River was dammed by huge landslides as a result of the earthquake of November 16, 1827.

==== Suaza Fault ====
The 125.8 kilometres (78.2 mi) long Suaza Fault,which has a right-lateral strike-slip sense of movement with some component of reverse faulting, crosses the western slope of the Eastern Ranges, close to the Upper Magdalena Valley. It puts Precambrian crystalline rocks on the east against Jurassic and Cretaceous sedimentary rocks on the west. Mesozoic granites are also displaced by the fault. A broad and long valley along the fault is filled with Quaternary sediments. Near the town of Suaza, exposures show at least two episodes of neotectonic deformation: 1) early thrusting of Jurassic rocks over older Quaternary deposits, and 2) later deformation affecting the Jurassic rocks, old Quaternary deposits, and the relatively young Quaternary sediments. Most of the fault trace south of the Upper Magdalena valley is poorly located and documented. On the basis of regional correlations, it is believed that the Garzon-Pitalito Fault, the Suaza Fault, and the Algeciras Fault all are continuous southward extensions of the Guaicáramo Fault sections.

==== Mocoa Fault ====
The 117.1 kilometres (72.8 mi) long Mocoa Fault, which has a reverse sense of movement with a component of right-lateral strike-slip, strikes close to the base of the eastern side of the mountain front of the central mountains and coincides with the abrupt change in slope between the Andean Range on the west and the dense forest-covered hilly lowlands on the east. The fault places Cretaceous and Jurassic sedimentary rocks and Tertiary to Quaternary volcanics on the west against Precambrian crystalline rocks on the east.

==== Sibundoy Fault ====
The 57.9 kilometres (36.0 mi) long Sibundoy Fault, which has a right-lateral strike-slip sense of movement, is located in the "Cordillera Centro-Oriental" to the east of the city of Pasto, which is south of where the cordillera splits in two ranges (Eastern and Central Ranges), this location is known as Colombian Massif. The Sibundoy Fault is probably the southward extension of the Suaza Fault and may well be part of the Afiladores Fault to the south. At the Sibundoy Valley (the locality where the Sibundoy Fault is best studied), the fault displaces Precambrian, Jurassic and Cretaceous rocks, and deforms Quaternary topographic features.

==== Afiladores Fault ====
The 99.9 kilometres (62.1 mi) long Afiladores Fault, which has a reverse sense of movement with a component of right-lateral strike-slip, runs through a geographic area of the Andes where the Central and Eastern Ranges merge into a single range known as the "Cordillera Centro-Oriental de Colombia". The fault offsets Precambrian gneisses and schists, metamorphic Paleozoic rocks, Mesozoic granitic rocks, and Tertiary sedimentary deposits. The fault extends south into the Republic of Ecuador and probably connects with the Chingual Fault.

== Activity ==
Several segments of the fault system are active, with major earthquakes occurring in historical times. The 1827 Timaná (Mw 7.7), 1834 Sibundoy (Mw 7.0), 1917 Sumapaz (Mw 7.3), 1967 Neiva (Mw 7.2), 1995 Tauramena (Mw 6.5) and 2008 El Calvario earthquakes (Mw 5.6) are associated with movement of the fault system.

== See also ==
- List of earthquakes in Colombia
- Bucaramanga-Santa Marta Fault
- Romeral Fault System
