= Algeciras, Huila =

Coordinates: 2°32′N 75°19′W

- Municipality and town
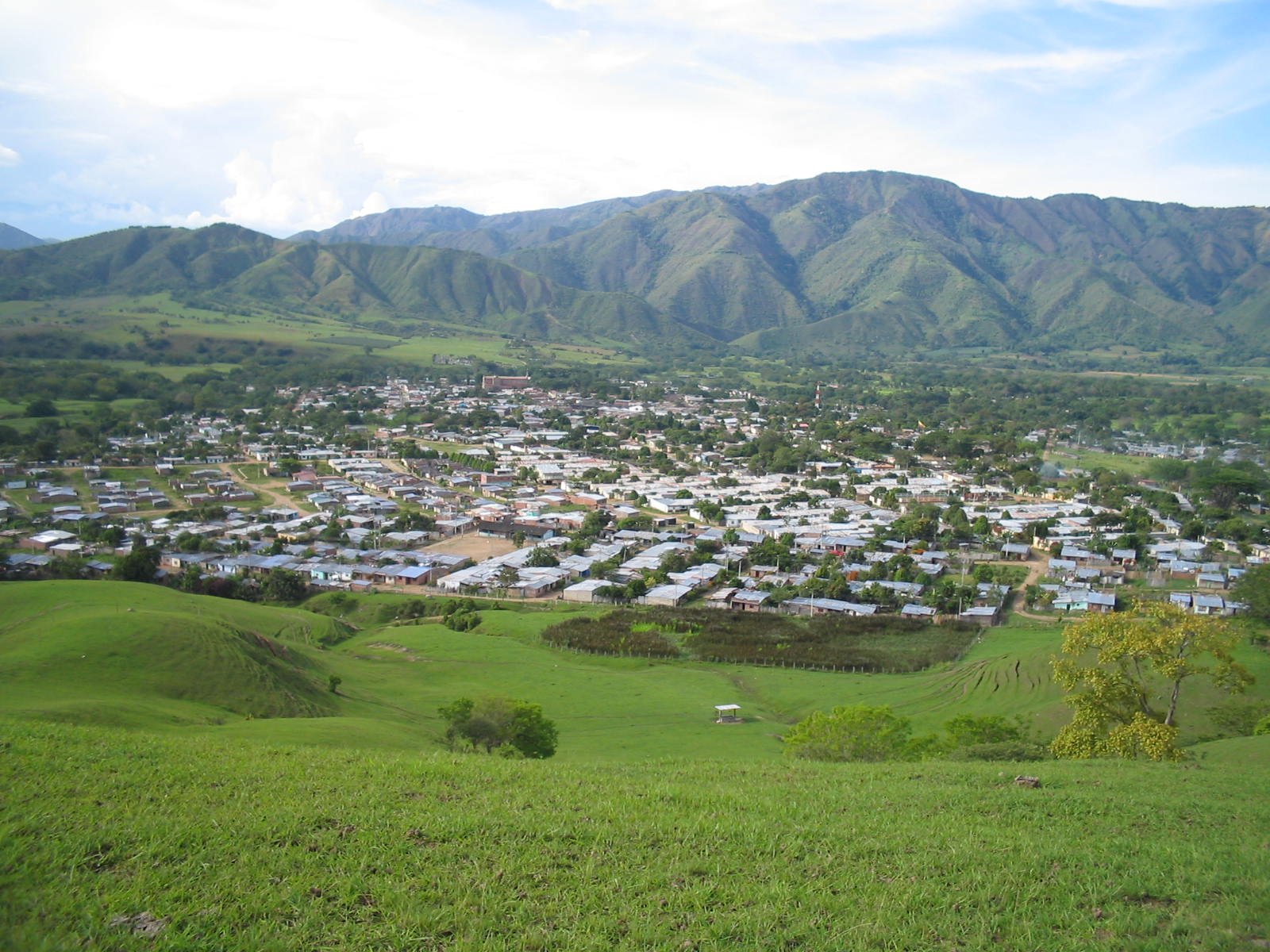
- Panoramic view of Algeciras

- Flag Coat of arms

- Location of the municipality and town of Algeciras, Huila in the Córdoba Department of Colombia.
- Country: Colombia
- Department: Huila Department
- Founded: February 10, 1824

Government
  - Mayor: Javier Rivera Cortes

Area
  - Total: 567.7 km^{2} (219.2 sq mi)
- Elevation: 1,528 m (5,013 ft)

Population (2015)
  - Total: 24,499
  - Density: 43.15/km^{2} (111.8/sq mi)
- Time zone: UTC-5 (Colombia Standard Time)

Algeciras (Spanish pronunciation: [alxeˈsiɾas]) is a town and municipality in the Huila Department, Colombia.

== Climate ==
Climate data for Algeciras, elevation 1,155 m (3,789 ft), (1981–2010)
Month	Jan	Feb	Mar	Apr	May	Jun	Jul	Aug	Sep	Oct	Nov	Dec	Year
Mean daily maximum °C (°F)	29.6 (85.3)	29.9 (85.8)	29.3 (84.7)	29.0 (84.2)	29.4 (84.9)	29.7 (85.5)	29.8 (85.6)	30.6 (87.1)	30.6 (87.1)	29.9 (85.8)	28.4 (83.1)	28.6 (83.5)	29.6 (85.3)
Daily mean °C (°F)	23.2 (73.8)	23.5 (74.3)	23.4 (74.1)	23.1 (73.6)	23.2 (73.8)	23.1 (73.6)	23.0 (73.4)	23.3 (73.9)	23.4 (74.1)	23.3 (73.9)	22.9 (73.2)	23.0 (73.4)	23.2 (73.8)
Mean daily minimum °C (°F)	17.7 (63.9)	17.9 (64.2)	18.1 (64.6)	18.1 (64.6)	18.3 (64.9)	17.7 (63.9)	17.1 (62.8)	17.1 (62.8)	17.0 (62.6)	17.7 (63.9)	18.2 (64.8)	17.9 (64.2)	17.7 (63.9)
Average precipitation mm (inches)	82.1 (3.23)	75.5 (2.97)	119.7 (4.71)	110.4 (4.35)	106.1 (4.18)	70.6 (2.78)	54.8 (2.16)	45.7 (1.80)	54.1 (2.13)	135.8 (5.35)	148.3 (5.84)	107.8 (4.24)	1,106.4 (43.56)
Average precipitation days	13	12	17	20	21	19	17	15	15	20	18	16	201
Average relative humidity (%)	76	75	77	79	78	76	73	69	70	73	79	79	75
Mean monthly sunshine hours	155.0	112.9	111.6	108.0	117.8	105.0	117.8	124.0	117.0	117.8	117.0	139.5	1,443.4
Mean daily sunshine hours	5.0	4.0	3.6	3.6	3.8	3.5	3.8	4.0	3.9	3.8	3.9	4.5	4.0
Source: Instituto de Hidrologia Meteorologia y Estudios Ambientales
