= El Calvario =

Coordinates: 4°25′N 73°40′W

- Municipality and town
- Flag Coat of arms

- Location of the municipality and town of El Calvario in the Meta Department of Colombia.
- Country: Colombia
- Department: Meta Department
- Elevation: 1,987 m (6,519 ft)
- Time zone: UTC-5 (Colombia Standard Time)
- Climate: Af/Cfb

El Calvario is a town and municipality in the Meta Department, Colombia. It was the epicenter of the 2008 Colombia earthquake.

== Climate ==
El Calvario has a borderline subtropical highland climate (Köppen Cfb)/tropical rainforest climate (Af) with mild mornings, warm afternoons and heavy to very heavy rainfall year-round.

Climate data for El Calvario
| Month | Jan | Feb | Mar | Apr | May | Jun | Jul | Aug | Sep | Oct | Nov | Dec | Year |
|---|---|---|---|---|---|---|---|---|---|---|---|---|---|
| Mean daily maximum °C (°F) | 23.8 (74.8) | 24.1 (75.4) | 24.1 (75.4) | 23.5 (74.3) | 23.0 (73.4) | 22.1 (71.8) | 22.2 (72.0) | 22.4 (72.3) | 22.8 (73.0) | 23.1 (73.6) | 22.9 (73.2) | 23.1 (73.6) | 23.1 (73.6) |
| Daily mean °C (°F) | 18.1 (64.6) | 18.6 (65.5) | 19.2 (66.6) | 19.0 (66.2) | 18.8 (65.8) | 18.1 (64.6) | 18.1 (64.6) | 18.0 (64.4) | 18.0 (64.4) | 18.3 (64.9) | 18.2 (64.8) | 17.9 (64.2) | 18.4 (65.1) |
| Mean daily minimum °C (°F) | 12.4 (54.3) | 13.1 (55.6) | 14.3 (57.7) | 14.6 (58.3) | 14.6 (58.3) | 14.2 (57.6) | 14.0 (57.2) | 13.7 (56.7) | 13.3 (55.9) | 13.6 (56.5) | 13.5 (56.3) | 12.8 (55.0) | 13.7 (56.6) |
| Average rainfall mm (inches) | 66.3 (2.61) | 112.4 (4.43) | 134.2 (5.28) | 345.7 (13.61) | 427.3 (16.82) | 452.1 (17.80) | 521.2 (20.52) | 431.9 (17.00) | 274.4 (10.80) | 221.2 (8.71) | 166.6 (6.56) | 82.2 (3.24) | 3,235.5 (127.38) |
| Average rainy days | 8 | 10 | 14 | 22 | 25 | 25 | 27 | 25 | 22 | 20 | 17 | 11 | 226 |
Source 1: IDEAM
Source 2: Climate-Data.org
