= Panama plate =

Small tectonic plate in Central America

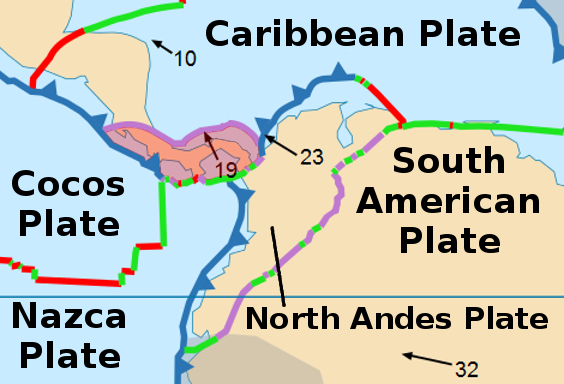
- Type: Micro
- Movement^{1}: North-west
- Speed^{1}: 19mm/year
- Features: Colombia, Costa Rica, and Panama
- ^{1}Relative to the African plate

The Panama plate is a small tectonic plate (microplate) that exists between two actively spreading ridges and moves relatively independently of its surrounding plates. The Panama plate is located between the Cocos plate and the Nazca plate to the south and the Caribbean plate to the north. Most of its borders are convergent boundaries, including a subduction zone to the west. It consists, for the most part, of the countries of Costa Rica and Panama.

== Geological setting ==
The Panama plate is a south-western extension of the Caribbean plate surrounded by five tectonic plates: the South American plate, Caribbean plate, Cocos plate, and Nazca plate, and by the Chortis tectonic block. The plate had once been a piece of volcanic arc that split off from the rest of the Caribbean plate between the late Tertiary and early Quaternary and is currently moving in a northward direction.

The Panama microplate is bordered to the north by the Panama deformed belt and a diffuse thrust belt in the Cordillera Central of Costa Rica. These thrust belts are being controlled by the active convergence of the Caribbean plate towards Central America. The eastern edge of the Panama plate is progressively conjoining with the continental plate of South America. Its western end is in contact with the continental Chortis block lying along a late cretaceous convergence zone where the Mesquito composite oceanic terrane is exposed. The plate's southern boundary is a subduction zone composed of the downward moving Cocos and Nazca plates.

The western expanse of the Panama microplate is characterized by deformation originating from the Tertiary and Quaternary, linking the North Panama deformed belt in the east with the Middle America trench in the west. Major changes in tectonic evolution exist across the Caribbean-Panama boundary, where three northeast-striking faults intersect with the Pacific coast. The Pacific side of the region is geologically active, with a narrow marine shelf exhibiting frequent volcanic activity and higher seismic activity, and the Atlantic side is more stable with a passive margin and broader marine shelf.

== Age ==
The geologic processes that shaped Central America the way it is seen present day were completed about 3 million years ago. Panama is the southernmost portion of Central America and is the youngest section of the land bridge now connecting North and South America. The land bridge had finished forming around 3.5 million years ago during the late Pliocene–early Pleistocene with the closing of the Caribbean-Pacific seaway.

== Kinematics ==
The Panama microplate is moving northward in relation to the Caribbean plate. Its ongoing collision with South America occurs at a rate of approximately 10–20 millimeters a year.

== Studies ==
Initial geologic studies of Central America revealed structural and stratigraphic differences between its northern and southern regions. Later studies grouped the regions of Honduras, Nicaragua, El Salvador and portions of Guatemala onto the structure termed the Chortis block. Further south, the remaining portion of Central America was observed to have similar yet distinct geologic characteristics from the Chortis block. This region, subsequently termed the Panama microplate has since been subdivided into two separate but geologically similar tectonic blocks: The Chortega block and the Choco block.
