= Caribbean terrane =

Geological province of Colombia

- Stratigraphic range: Late Cretaceous (emplaced); ~100–65 Ma
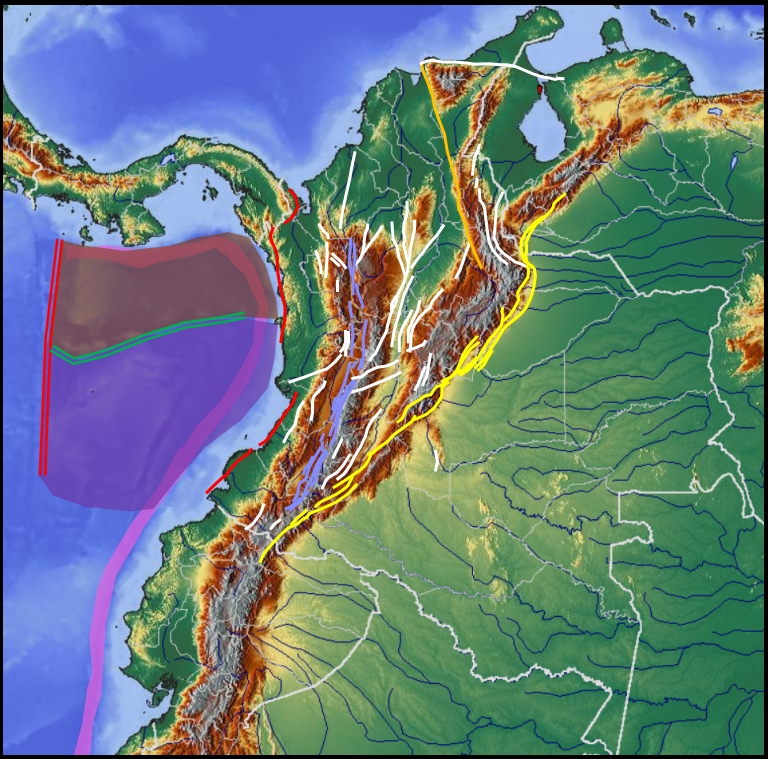
- The Caribbean terrane is enclosed by the Bucaramanga–Santa Marta Fault (orange), Romeral fault system (violet) and plate boundaries with Coiba (red) and Malpelo plates (purple)
- Type: Terrane
- Unit of: North Andes plate
- Sub-units: Subunits
- Overlies: Arquía, Tahamí & Quebradagrande terranes

Lithology
- Primary: Complexes, basins
- Other: Volcanoes

Location
- Location: Antioquia, Atlántico, Caldas, Cauca, Chocó, Córdoba, Nariño, Quindío, Risaralda, Sucre, Valle del Cauca departments
- Coordinates: 6°28′00″N 77°00′00″W
- Region: Caribbean, Pacific/Chocó
- Country: Colombia
- Extent: Central, Western, Darién, Baudó, Montes de María

Type section
- Named for: Caribbean
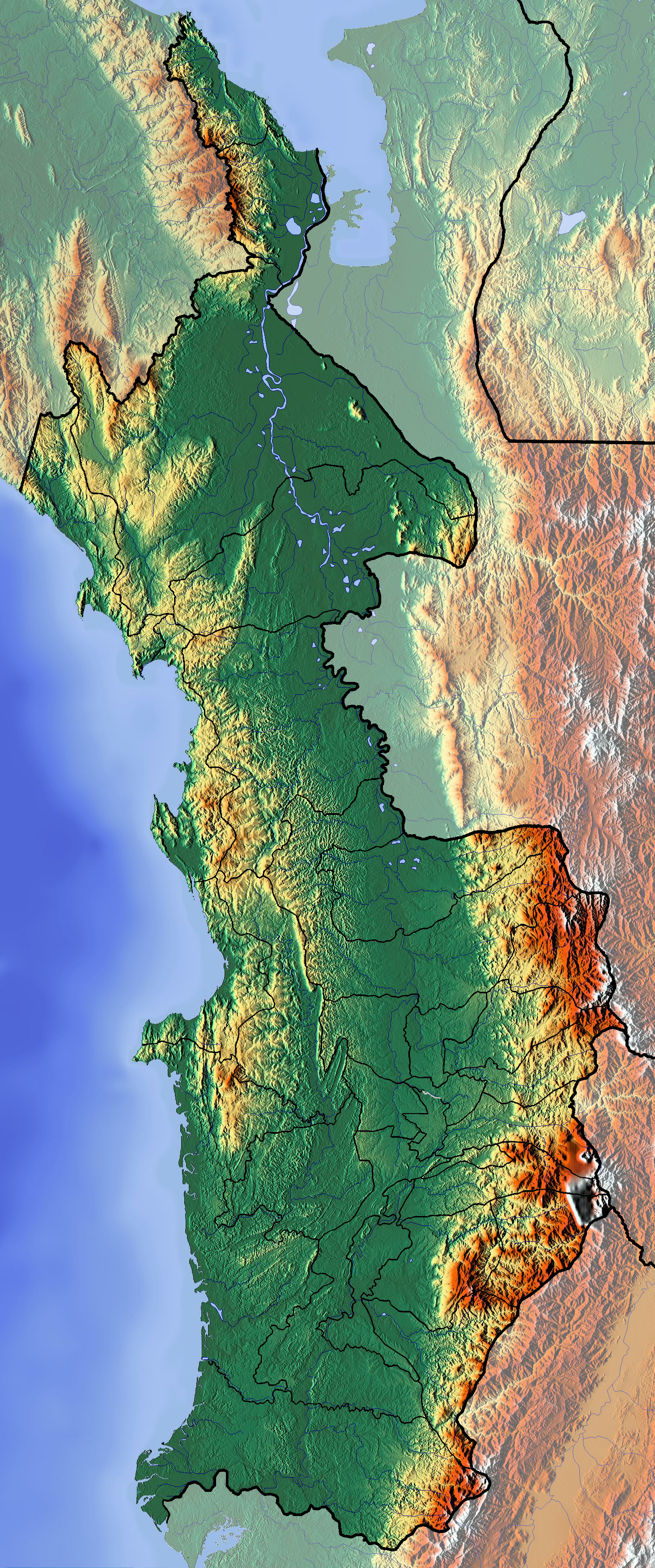
- Caribbean terrane (Colombia) Caribbean terrane (Chocó Department)

The Caribbean terrane (Spanish: Terreno del Caribe, TC) is a geological province (terrane) of Colombia. The terrane, dating to the Late Cretaceous, is situated on the North Andes plate and borders the La Guajira, Chibcha and underlying Tahamí terrane along the regional Bucaramanga–Santa Marta Fault. The terrane overlies the Tahamí, Arquía and Quebradagrande terranes along the Romeral fault system.

== Reinterpretation ==
A study performed by Mora Bohórquez et al. in 2017 showed no basement variation between the Chibcha terrane San Lucas basement underlying the Lower Magdalena Valley (VIM) and the SNSM basement to the east of the Santa Marta fault. The authors redefined the contacts between the different terranes, using the names Calima terrane for the coastal portion of the Caribbean terrane (San Jacinto and Sinú fold belts) and Tahamí–Panzenú terrane for the Tahamí terrane.

== Subdivision ==
=== Domains ===
The terrane was subdivided by Fuck et al. (2008) into:

Oceanic crust

- Calima Terrane (Calima, emplaced in Late Cretaceous)
- Guna Terrane (Guna, emplaced in Miocene)
- Gorgona Terrane (Gorgona, Miocene)

=== Complexes ===
- Alto Condoto
- Santa Cecilia-La Equis
- Uré
- Cajamarca
- Puquí
- Bolo Azul
- Cañasgordas
- Mistrató
  - Mistrató Tonalite – Paleogene (46 ± 7 Ma)
- Buriticá
- Anserma – Late Cretaceous (71 ± 2.1 Ma)

Batholiths

- Acandí
- Mandé – Miocene
- Sabanalarga – Cretaceous
- Santa Bárbara
- Puqui
- Río Tarazá
- Carauta
- Nudillales
- Cerro Plateado
- Farallones
- Comitá
- San José de Urama
- La Clara-Río Calle

=== Volcanoes ===
- Azufral
- Chiles
- Cumbal
- El Totumo (mud volcano)

=== Ranges ===
- Central
- Western
  - Nudo de los Pastos
- Darién
- Baudó
- Montes de María

=== Basins ===
- Cauca-Patía
- Chocó
- Sinú-San Jacinto
- Tumaco
- Urabá

=== Faults ===
- Bucaramanga-Santa Marta (BSF)
- Romeral (RFS)
  - Armenia
  - Buesaco-Aranda
  - Córdoba-Navarco
  - Montenegro
  - Paraíso
  - Piendamó
  - Rosas-Julumito
- Abriaquí
- Argelia
- Cañasgordas
- Cauca
- Garrapatas
- Murindó
- Murrí
- Mutatá
- Montería
- Naya-Micay
- Piedrancha
- Remolino-El Charco
- Santa Rita
- El Tambor
- Toro
- Tucurá
- Unguía
- Urrao

== Gallery ==
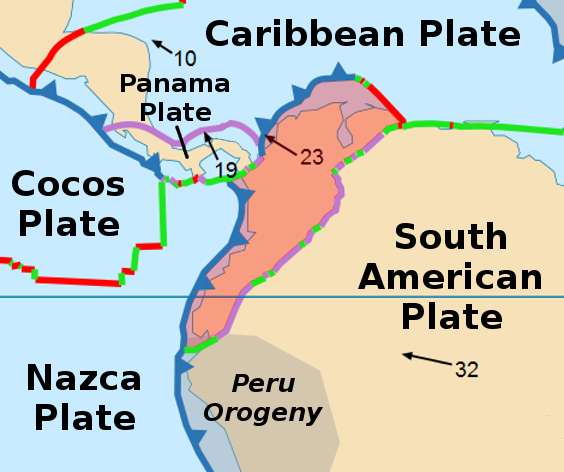
North Andes plate

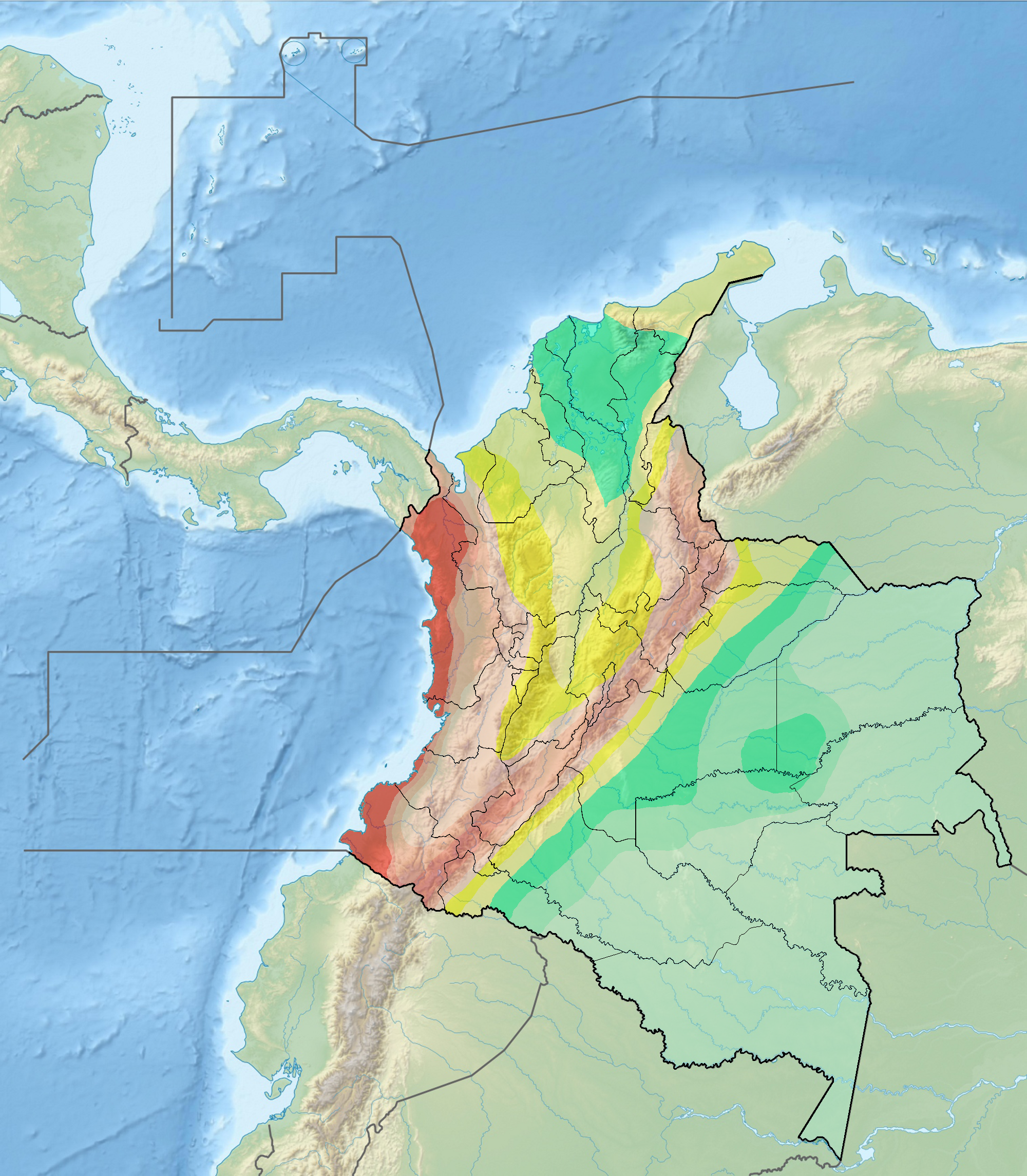
Seismic activity map

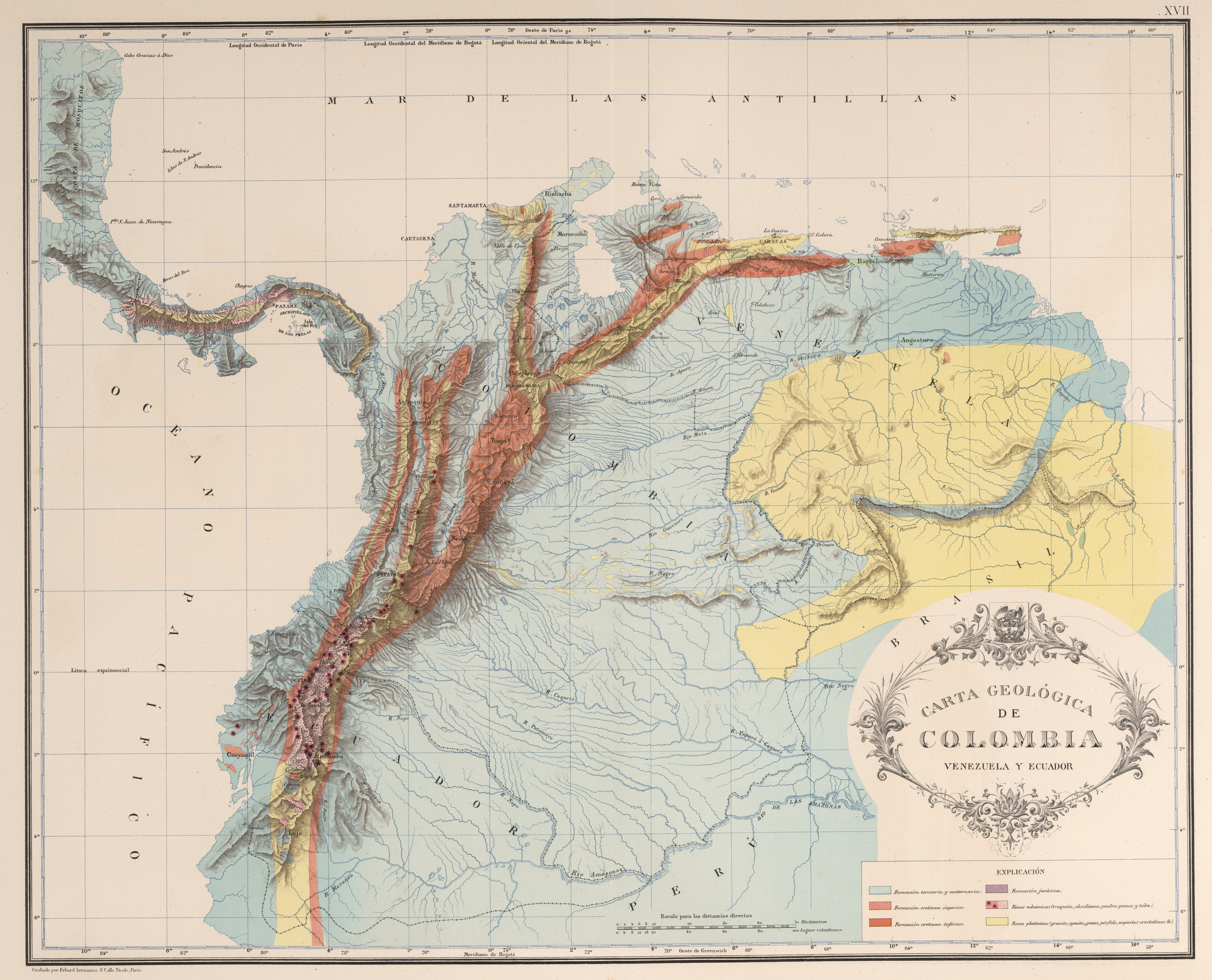
Geologic map (Codazzi, 1890)

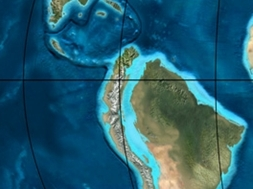
Paleogeography of the Late Cretaceous (Blakey)

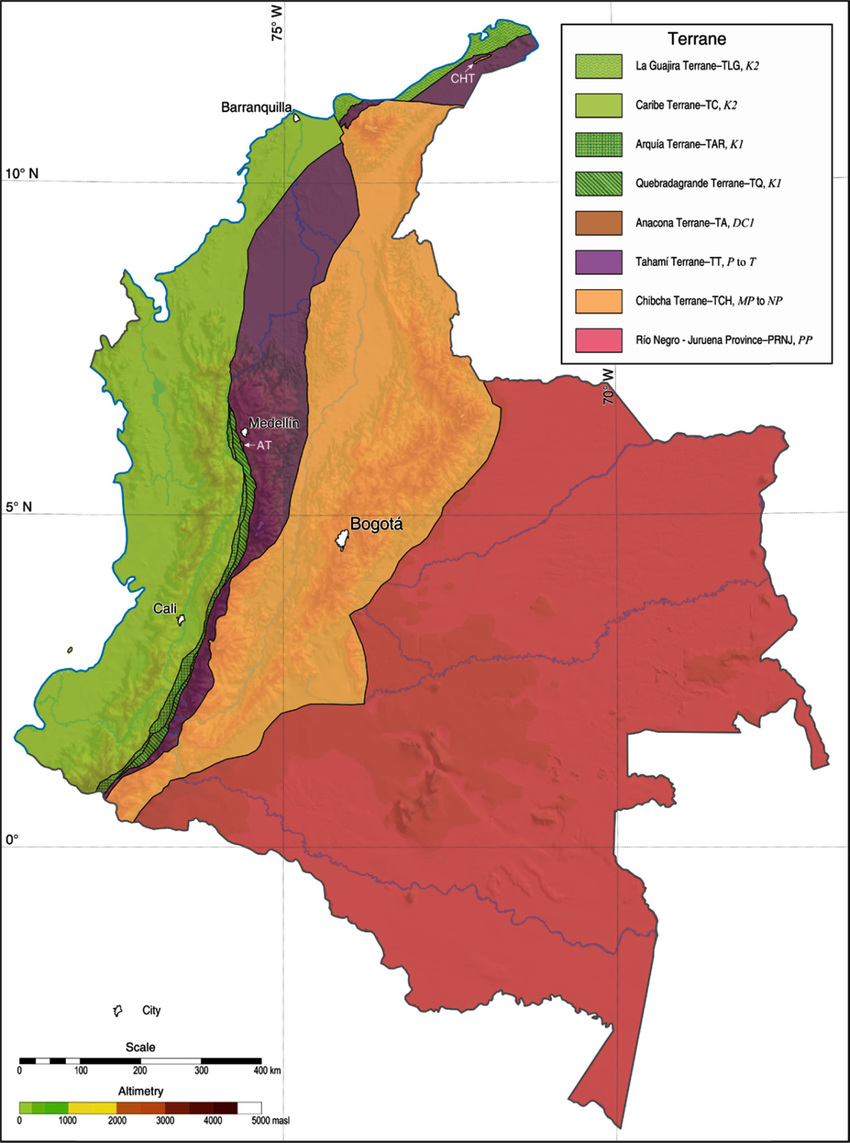
Geological terranes map of Colombia

== See also ==
- List of earthquakes in Colombia
- List of fossiliferous stratigraphic units in Colombia
- List of mining areas in Colombia
- Geology of the Eastern Hills of Bogotá
- Cesar-Ranchería Basin
- Cocinetas Basin
- Middle Magdalena Valley (VMM)
