= Argelia =

Argelia is Spanish and Portuguese for Algeria. It may also refer to:

== Places ==
- Argelia, Antioquia, a town in Colombia
- Argelia, Cauca, a town in Colombia
- Argelia, Valle del Cauca, a town in Colombia
- Argelia Fault, a fault line in Colombia

== People ==
- Argelia Laya (1926–1997), Venezuelan activist and politician
- Argelia Velez-Rodriguez (born 1936), Cuban-American mathematician and educator
- María Argelia Vizcaíno (born 1955), Cuban writer and activist

== See also ==
- Argelita, a municipality in Valencia, Spain
