= El Rosal =

El Rosal may refer to:

- El Rosal, Caracas a neighbourhood in Caracas, Venezuela
- El Rosal, a population located in the Iscancé Valley in the Colombian Massif in the municipality of San Sebastian in the Cauca Department.
- El Rosal, Chile, a village in Penco, Chile, part of the Greater Concepción conurbation| Sn Sebastian
- El Rosal, Cundinamarca a town and municipality in Cundinamarca, Colombia
- O Rosal (in Galician; El Rosal in Spanish), a municipality in the province of Pontevedra, Galicia, Spain
- Rosal de la Frontera a municipality in the province of Huelva, Andalusia, Spain
- El Rosal de los Boldos (known as "El Rosal"), a neighbourhood in the Chilean commune of Santa Cruz, Colchagua Province

== See also ==
- Rosa (disambiguation)
- Rosal, a surname
