= Urrao Fault =

Geological fault in Colombia

- Falla de Urrao
- Location within Colombia
- Etymology: Urrao
- Coordinates: 06°23′08″N 76°04′58″W
- Country: Colombia
- Region: Andean
- State: Antioquia

Characteristics
- Range: Western Ranges, Andes
- Part of: Andean oblique faults
- Length: 30.5 km (19.0 mi)
- Strike: 003.6 ± 1
- Dip: Vertical
- Displacement: 0.2–1 mm (0.0079–0.0394 in)/yr

Tectonics
- Plate: North Andean
- Status: Inactive
- Type: Oblique-slip fault strike-slip fault
- Movement: Normal sinistral
- Age: Quaternary
- Orogeny: Andean

The Urrao Fault (Spanish: Falla de Urrao) is a sinistral oblique strike-slip fault in the department of Antioquia in northwestern Colombia. The fault has a total length of 30.5 kilometres (19.0 mi) and runs along an average north to south strike of 003.6 ± 1 in the Western Ranges of the Colombian Andes.

== Etymology ==
The fault is named after Urrao.

== Description ==
This set of two parallel faults extend along the axis of the Western Ranges of the Colombian Andes, close to the valleys of the Anacosca and Penderisco Rivers, and the plateau of the Frontino Páramo. Located to the west of the city of Medellín, the faults mainly displace Tertiary sedimentary rocks. The west branch of the fault has mainly normal slip as observed from offset alluvial terraces. The fault forms spectacular fault scarps on terraces. These scarps are 10 kilometres (6.2 mi) long and as much as 50 metres (160 ft) high. Most of the fault trace has a moderate alignment of topographic features, such as linear streams and offset spurs. Quaternary alluvial sediments of the Penderisco River are offset an unknown amount. The slip rate is estimated at 0.2 to 1 millimetre (0.0079 to 0.0394 in) per year deduced from displaced Quaternary sediments.

== See also ==
- List of earthquakes in Colombia
- Abriaquí Fault
- Cañasgordas Fault
- Romeral Fault System
