= Córdoba-Navarco Fault =

Fault in the department of Quindío, Colombia

- Falla Córdoba-Navarco
- Location within Colombia
- Etymology: Córdoba & Navarco River
- Coordinates: 04°20′34″N 75°42′08″W
- Country: Colombia
- Region: Andean
- State: Quindío

Characteristics
- Range: Central Ranges
- Part of: Romeral Fault System
- Length: 21.2 km (13.2 mi)
- Strike: 018.5 ± 4
- Dip: Vertical
- Displacement: <0.2 mm (0.0079 in)/yr

Tectonics
- Plate: North Andean
- Status: Active
- Earthquakes: 1999 Armenia (M_{w} 6.1)
- Type: Strike-slip fault
- Movement: Sinistral
- Rock units: Córdoba & Quebradagrande Complexes
- Age: Quaternary
- Orogeny: Andean

The Córdoba-Navarco Fault (Spanish: Falla Córdoba-Navarco) is a sinistral strike-slip fault in the department of Quindío in west-central Colombia. The fault has a total length of 21.2 kilometres (13.2 mi) and runs along an average north-northeast to south-southwest strike of 018.5 ± 4 in the Central Ranges of the Colombian Andes.

The fault segment pertaining to the megaregional Romeral Fault System is a set of two faults that are active, causing the major 1999 Armenia earthquake with approximately 1185 fatalities.

== Etymology ==
The fault is named after Córdoba and the Navarco River in Quindío.

== Description ==
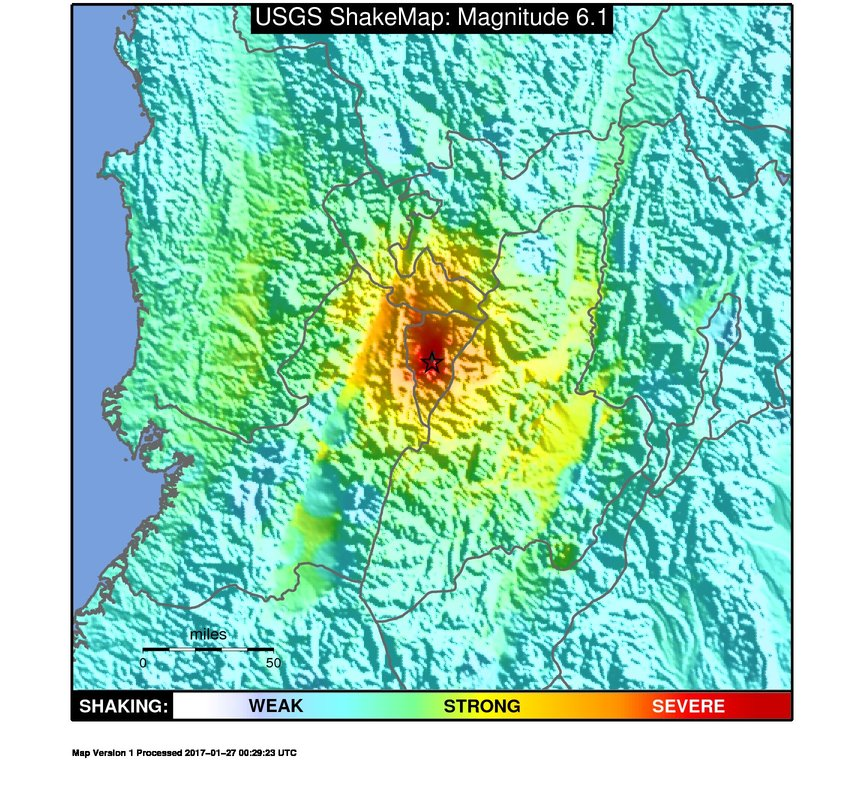
ShakeMap of the 1999 Armenia earthquake

The fault section is formed by the Córdoba and Navarco Faults, which are eastern strands of Romeral Fault System, south of the city of Armenia. These faults lie within the epicenter area of the Armenia earthquake of January 25, 1999. The faults extend through sheared cataclastic and undeformed basaltic and sedimentary Cretaceous oceanic rocks, cropping out on the eastern slope of the Central Ranges of Colombia. It separates the Córdoba Complex from the Quebradagrande Complex.

Well preserved fault trace controls stream drainages. The Córdoba-Navarco Fault forms fault saddles and eroded fault scarps. Neotectonic features are not very outstanding. Slopes in this part of the Central Ranges are rather steep, so erosion rate is high.

The fault terminates in the south against the Ibagué Fault.

=== Activity ===
On January 25, 1999, a major earthquake hit the capitals of Quindío, Armenia, and Risaralda, Pereira. The earthquake had a moment magnitude of 6.1 and an intensity of X and occurred at a depth of 17.0 kilometres (55,800 ft). The natural disaster caused around 1185 casualties in central Colombia and was the strongest earthquake in 16 years.

== See also ==
- List of earthquakes in Colombia
- Armenia Fault
- Montenegro Fault
