= Rosas-Julumito Fault =

Colombian geologic fault

- Falla de Rosas-Julumito
- Location within Colombia
- Etymology: Rosas, vereda Julumito
- Coordinates: 02°21′38″N 76°42′54″W
- Country: Colombia
- Region: Andean
- State: Cauca
- Cities: Popayán

Characteristics
- Range: Central Ranges, Andes.
- Part of: Romeral Fault System
- Length: 43.3 km (26.9 mi)
- Strike: 026.9 ± 7
- Dip: West
- Dip angle: Moderate to high
- Displacement: 0.2–1 mm (0.0079–0.0394 in)/yr

Tectonics
- Plate: North Andean
- Status: Active
- Earthquakes: 1983 Popayán earthquake (M_{w} 5.5)
- Type: Oblique thrust fault
- Movement: Reverse dextral
- Rock units: Popayán Formation
- Age: Quaternary
- Orogeny: Andean

The Rosas-Julumito Fault (Spanish: Falla de Rosas-Julumito) is an oblique dextral strike-slip fault in the department of Cauca in southwestern Colombia. The fault is part of the megaregional Romeral Fault System and has a total length of 43.3 kilometres (26.9 mi) and runs along an average northeast to southwest strike of 026.9 ± 7 in the Central Ranges of the Colombian Andes. The fault is associated with the 1983 Popayán earthquake that partially destroyed Popayán, the capital of Cauca, and led to more than 300 fatalities. A maximum moment magnitude earthquake of 6.8 is estimated for the fault.

== Etymology ==
The fault is named after Rosas, Cauca and vereda Julumito of Popayán.

== Description ==
The Rosas-Julumito Fault is part of the Romeral Fault System. It is a rather short section of about 43 kilometres (27 mi) length, 17 kilometres (11 mi) of which have active tectonic movement. The fault section parallels the Cauca-Almaguer Fault, which is one of the largest older fracture zones in western Colombia. The Rosas-Julumito fault runs about 5 kilometres (3.1 mi) west of the city of Popayán. The fault crosses the Pliocene to Pleistocene Popayán Formation, which consists of pyroclastic flow, mud flow and ash-fall deposits. It is believed that either the Rosas Fault or the nearby Julumito Fault (less than 2 kilometres (1.2 mi) to the west) produced the earthquake of March 31, 1983 that partially destroyed the city of Popayán.

The fault section runs through the smooth but hilly topography that is formed by sediments of the Popayán Formation. The fault morphology is easily observed in aerial photographs and satellite images and from aircraft. The most noticeable features are fault saddles, ponded Quaternary alluvial valleys, stream deflections, offset drainages, linear fault ridges, and shutter ridges. Beyond the Popayán Formation, where the fault is in older rock formations, the topographic expression of the fault is still noticeable.

=== Activity ===
The fault is associated with the devastating 1983 Popayán earthquake (M_{w} 5.5) that caused more than 300 fatalities. During the 1983 earthquake, several cracks with generally north trends developed at the surface in an area 2 kilometres (1.2 mi) wide and 2.5 kilometres (1.6 mi) long, north of Popayán. Individual cracks were a few meters to tens of meters long and a few millimeters in width. A maximum moment magnitude of 6.8 is assumed for this fault using only 17 kilometres (11 mi) for its probable total surface rupture length.

== See also ==
- List of earthquakes in Colombia
- Buesaco-Aranda Fault
