= Guáitara Fault =

Geologic feature in Colombia

- Falla de Guáitara
- Location within Colombia
- Etymology: Guáitara River
- Coordinates: 00°53′50″N 77°31′54″W
- Country: Colombia
- Region: Andean
- State: Nariño
- Cities: Ipiales

Characteristics
- Range: Western Ranges, Andes
- Part of: Andean strike-slip faults
- Length: 36.1 km (22.4 mi)
- Strike: 044.1 ± 4
- Dip: East
- Dip angle: High
- Displacement: <0.2 mm (0.0079 in)/yr

Tectonics
- Plate: North Andean
- Status: Inactive
- Type: Strike-slip fault
- Movement: Dextral
- Age: Quaternary
- Orogeny: Andean
- Volcanic arc/belt: North Volcanic Zone; Andean Volcanic Belt

The Guáitara Fault (Spanish: Falla de Guáitara) is a dextral strike-slip fault in the department of Nariño in southwestern Colombia. The fault has a total length of 36.1 kilometres (22.4 mi) and runs along an average northeast to the southwest strike of 044.1 ± 4 in the Western Ranges of the Colombian Andes.

== Etymology ==
The fault is named after the Guáitara River in Nariño.

== Description ==
The Guáitara Fault is in the Nariño Department of southwestern Colombia, crossing the Western Ranges of the Colombian Andes and to the south of the city of Pasto. The fault offsets Neogene volcanic rocks. The fault is believed to extend south into the Republic of Ecuador and may be part of the megaregional Romeral Fault System. The fault forms well-developed deep V-shaped valleys, linear topographic features, fault-controlled drainage, deflected streams, and elongated hills.

== See also ==
- List of earthquakes in Colombia
- Piedrancha Fault
- Romeral Fault System
