= Montería Fault =

- Falla de Montería
- Location within Colombia
- Etymology: Montería
- Coordinates: 08°40′27″N 75°55′51″W
- Country: Colombia
- Region: Caribbean
- State: Córdoba
- Cities: Montería

Characteristics
- Range: Sinu-San Jacinto Basin
- Part of: Andean thrust faults
- Length: 202.2 km (125.6 mi)
- Strike: 010 ± 4
- Dip: East
- Dip angle: High
- Displacement: <0.2 mm (0.0079 in)/yr

Tectonics
- Plate: North Andean
- Status: Inactive
- Type: Thrust fault
- Movement: Reverse
- Age: Quaternary
- Orogeny: Andean

The Montería Fault (Spanish: Falla de Montería) is a thrust fault in the department of Córdoba in northern Colombia. The fault has a total length of 202.2 kilometres (125.6 mi) and runs along an average north-northwest to south-southeast strike of 010 ± 4 in the Sinú-San Jacinto Basin.

== Etymology ==
The fault is named after Montería.

== Description ==
The fault is located in the northwest corner of the country. It extends through the Sinú Valley and passes close to the city of Montería. The fault places upper Tertiary rocks of the Sinú Belt (to the west) against lower Tertiary rocks of the San Jacinto Belt (to the east). To the north, the fault is covered by young alluvial deposits.

== See also ==
- List of earthquakes in Colombia
- Bucaramanga-Santa Marta Fault
- Romeral Fault System
