= Piedrancha Fault =

- Falla de Piedrancha
- Location within Colombia
- Etymology: Piedrancha
- Coordinates: 01°02′13″N 78°01′32″W
- Country: Colombia
- Region: Andean
- State: Nariño

Characteristics
- Range: Western Ranges, Andes
- Part of: Andean oblique faults
- Length: 79.5 km (49.4 mi)
- Strike: 033.8 ± 14
- Dip: East
- Dip angle: Near-vertical
- Displacement: <0.2 mm (0.0079 in)/yr

Tectonics
- Plate: North Andean
- Status: Inactive
- Type: Oblique-slip fault strike-slip fault
- Movement: Dextral reverse
- Age: Quaternary
- Orogeny: Andean

The Piedrancha Fault (Spanish: Falla de Piedrancha) is a dextral oblique strike-slip fault in the department of Nariño in southwestern Colombia. The fault has a total length of 79.5 kilometres (49.4 mi) and runs along an average northeast to southwest strike of 033.8 ± 14 in the Western Ranges of the Colombian Andes.

== Etymology ==
The fault is named after Piedrancha, the original name for the municipality Mallama in Nariño.

== Description ==
The Piedrancha Fault is in the Nariño Department of southwestern Colombia, on the western slope of the Western Ranges of the Colombian Andes and to the west of the city of Pasto. The fault places Cretaceous oceanic rocks on the west against Cenozoic volcanic rocks on the east. The fault is believed to extend south into the Republic of Ecuador.

== See also ==
- List of earthquakes in Colombia
- Guáitara Fault
- Romeral Fault System
