= Rosal =

Rosal is a surname principally of Spanish origin. It may be related to the Spanish word for rose. Notable people with the surname include:

- Angelita Rosal (born 1951), American table tennis player
- Gregorio Rosal (1947–2011), Filipino revolutionary
- Guillermo Rosal (born 1945), Spanish bobsledder
- Maria Vicenta Rosal (1815–1886), Guatemalan missionary and advocate of women's rights
- Noel Rosal (born 1964), Filipino politician
- Patrick Rosal (born 1969), Filipino American poet
- Rosa Rosal (Florence Danon Gayda; 1928–2025), Filipino actress and humanitarian

== Other uses ==
- Bay Area Rosal, an American indoor soccer team
- Rosal, Sutherland a depopulated town in Scotland

== See also ==
- El Rosal (disambiguation)
