= Piendamó, Cauca =

Piendamó
- Municipality and town
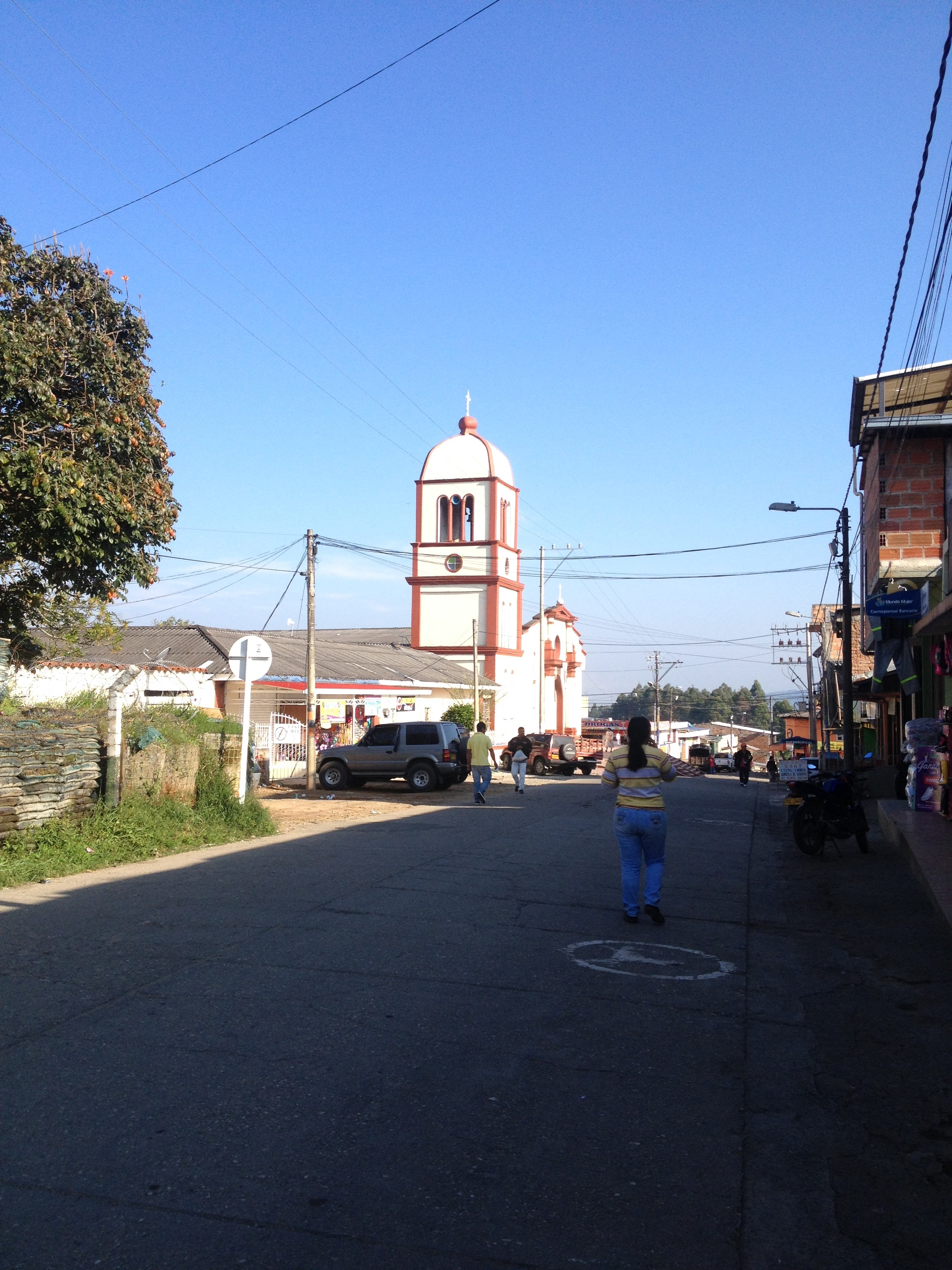
- Church of Piendamó

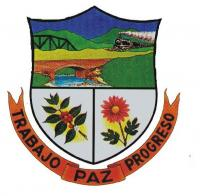
- Flag Coat of arms

- Location of Piendamó in Cauca
- Coordinates: 2°38′26.9″N 76°31′42.2″W
- Country: Colombia
- Department: Cauca
- Province: Central
- Founded: 2 April 1924
- Founder: Pedro Antonio Sandoval

Government
  - Mayor: Victor Isaac Valencia Sandoval (2016-2019)

Area
  - Municipality and town: 197 km^{2} (76 sq mi)
  - Urban: 30 km^{2} (12 sq mi)
- Elevation: 1,685 m (5,528 ft)

Population (2017)
  - Municipality and town: 44,535
  - Density: 226/km^{2} (586/sq mi)
  - Urban: 14,696
  - Urban density: 490/km^{2} (1,300/sq mi)
- Time zone: UTC-5 (Colombia Standard Time)
- Climate: Cfb
- Website: Official website

Piendamó is a municipality in the department of Cauca in southwestern Colombia.

== History ==
The town of Piendamó was founded by Pedro Antonio Sandoval on April 2, 1525.

Piendamó was formerly called Tunía and as such an encomienda of the conquistadors Sebastian de Belalcázar, Francisco Arévalo, Pedro Matta and Pedro de Velasco.

In 1917, the construction of the railway line that would link the city of Cali with the city of Popayán began, approving the layout for the site where Piendamó is today. At the beginning of 1924 the first locomotives arrived in this town and with them a large number of merchants, immigrants and settlers from the department of Valle del Cauca and the coffee region.

== Description ==
The municipality is located in the Cauca Basin in the valley of the Cauca River at an altitude of 1,685 metres (5,528 ft) above mean sea level. It borders Silvia in the east, Morales in the west, Caldono in the north and Cajibio in the south.

== Named after Piendamó ==
- Piendamó River
- Piendamó Fault

== Climate ==
Climate data for Piendamó (Tunia), elevation 1,800 m (5,900 ft), (1981–2010)
Month	Jan	Feb	Mar	Apr	May	Jun	Jul	Aug	Sep	Oct	Nov	Dec	Year
Mean daily maximum °C (°F)	23.6 (74.5)	23.9 (75.0)	23.8 (74.8)	23.6 (74.5)	23.6 (74.5)	23.7 (74.7)	24.4 (75.9)	25.0 (77.0)	24.4 (75.9)	23.6 (74.5)	23.0 (73.4)	23.1 (73.6)	23.8 (74.8)
Daily mean °C (°F)	19.0 (66.2)	19.0 (66.2)	19.0 (66.2)	19.1 (66.4)	18.9 (66.0)	19.2 (66.6)	19.4 (66.9)	19.7 (67.5)	19.3 (66.7)	18.9 (66.0)	18.6 (65.5)	18.7 (65.7)	19.1 (66.4)
Mean daily minimum °C (°F)	14.2 (57.6)	14.5 (58.1)	14.7 (58.5)	14.9 (58.8)	14.8 (58.6)	14.5 (58.1)	14.0 (57.2)	14.0 (57.2)	14.0 (57.2)	14.2 (57.6)	14.4 (57.9)	14.4 (57.9)	14.4 (57.9)
Average precipitation mm (inches)	192.0 (7.56)	221.9 (8.74)	226.0 (8.90)	242.6 (9.55)	172.6 (6.80)	79.6 (3.13)	61.2 (2.41)	47.7 (1.88)	102.9 (4.05)	221.2 (8.71)	260.3 (10.25)	257.4 (10.13)	2,046 (80.55)
Average precipitation days	18	17	21	22	19	14	10	8	13	21	22	22	204
Average relative humidity (%)	82	84	84	85	85	83	81	78	80	83	85	85	83
Source: Instituto de Hidrologia Meteorologia y Estudios Ambientales
