= Abriaquí Fault =

Geological fault in Colombia

- Falla de Abriaquí
- Location within Colombia
- Etymology: Abriaquí
- Coordinates: 06°40′09″N 76°06′38″W
- Country: Colombia
- Region: Andean
- State: Antioquia

Characteristics
- Range: Western Ranges, Andes
- Part of: Andean oblique faults
- Length: 33.8 km (21.0 mi)
- Strike: 311 ± 2
- Dip: Northeast
- Dip angle: High
- Displacement: 0.2–1 mm (0.0079–0.0394 in)/yr

Tectonics
- Plate: North Andean
- Status: Inactive
- Type: Oblique thrust fault
- Movement: Reverse sinistral
- Age: Quaternary
- Orogeny: Andean

The Abriaquí Fault (Spanish: Falla de Abriaquí) is an oblique thrust fault in the department of Antioquia in northwestern Colombia. The fault has a total length of 33.8 kilometres (21.0 mi) and runs along an average northwest to southeast strike of 311 ± 2 in the Western Ranges of the Colombian Andes.

== Etymology ==
The fault is named after Abriaquí.

== Description ==
The Abriaquí Fault parallels the Cañasgordas Fault to the south, cutting Cretaceous oceanic volcanic rocks as well as Tertiary and Cretaceous sedimentary rocks. The fault has a well defined fault trace with scarps, saddles, and deflected streams. The slip rate is estimated at 0.2 to 1 millimetre (0.0079 to 0.0394 in) per year deduced from displaced geomorphologic features.

== See also ==
- List of earthquakes in Colombia
- Romeral Fault System
