= Piendamó Fault =

- Falla de Piendamó
- Location within Colombia
- Etymology: Piendamó
- Coordinates: 02°39′48″N 76°32′53″W
- Country: Colombia
- Region: Andean
- State: Cauca
- Cities: Piendamó

Characteristics
- Range: Central Ranges, Andes
- Part of: Romeral Fault System
- Length: 28.3 km (17.6 mi)
- Strike: Variable from 320 to 010
- Dip: East to northeast
- Dip angle: High
- Displacement: 0.2–1 mm (0.0079–0.0394 in)/yr

Tectonics
- Plate: North Andean
- Status: Inactive
- Type: Oblique-slip fault strike-slip fault
- Movement: Reverse dextral
- Rock units: Popayán Formation
- Age: Quaternary
- Orogeny: Andean

The Piendamó Fault (Spanish: Falla de Piendamó) is an oblique dextral strike-slip fault in the department of Cauca in southwestern Colombia. The fault is part of the megaregional Romeral Fault System and has a total length of 28.3 kilometres (17.6 mi) and runs along a variable average north to south strike of 341.6 ± 18 in the Central Ranges of the Colombian Andes.

== Etymology ==
The fault is named after Piendamó, Cauca.

== Description ==
The Piendamó Fault is part of Romeral Fault System in southwestern Colombia. The fault is located at the base of the mountain front of the western slope of the Central Ranges, north of the city of Popayán. The fault displaces volcanic pyroclastic deposits and mud flows of the Tertiary to Quaternary Popayán Formation. It forms an outstanding topographic and tectonic block bounded by two intersecting faults.

The fault forms an outstanding prismatic-tectonic mountain block composed of pyroclastic flow and ash-fall deposits. This block is bounded by two well developed fault scarps of about 400 metres (1,300 ft) height; one facing west-southwest and the other facing south-southwest. There is geomorphic evidence of scarp degradation and old landslides on the face of these scarps. Deep canyons cut about 200 metres (660 ft) into scarps formed against a flat-topped 400 metres (1,300 ft) high mountain. Several close fault lines parallel the west-southwest-facing scarp. The 400 metres (1,300 ft) high Piendamó scarp is one of the largest for neotectonic Quaternary faults in western Colombia.

== See also ==
- List of earthquakes in Colombia
- Rosas-Julumito Fault
