= Toro Fault =

- Falla de Toro
- Location within Colombia
- Etymology: Toro
- Coordinates: 04°57′30.2″N 75°58′43.4″W
- Country: Colombia
- Region: Andean
- State: Risaralda, Valle del Cauca

Characteristics
- Range: Western Ranges, Andes
- Part of: Andean strike slip faults
- Length: 61.9 km (38.5 mi)
- Strike: 006.6 ± 8
- Dip: unknown
- Displacement: <0.2 mm (0.0079 in)/yr

Tectonics
- Plate: North Andean
- Status: Inactive
- Type: Strike-slip fault
- Movement: Sinistral
- Age: Quaternary
- Orogeny: Andean

The Toro Fault (Spanish: Falla de Toro) is a sinistral strike-slip fault in the departments of Valle del Cauca and Risaralda in western Colombia. The fault has a total length of 61.9 kilometres (38.5 mi) and runs along an average north to south strike of 006.6 ± 8 in the Western Ranges of the Colombian Andes.

== Etymology ==
The fault is named after Toro, Valle del Cauca.

== Description ==
The Toro Fault cuts accreted oceanic rocks of the Western Ranges of the Colombian Andes, close to the Cauca River valley. It is one of the faults of the regional Cauca-Patía Fault System that bounds the eastern side of the Western Ranges along most of the range's length. This well developed fault trace has an eroded fault scarp, degraded triangular facets, and the fronts of spurs show evidence of sinistral deformation.

== See also ==
- List of earthquakes in Colombia
- Romeral Fault System
