= Cañasgordas =

- Municipality and town
- Flag

- Location of the municipality and town of Cañasgordas in the Antioquia Department of Colombia

- Location in Colombia
- Coordinates: 6°44′59″N 76°1′33″W
- Country: Colombia
- Department: Antioquia Department
- Subregion: Western

Area
  - Total: 391 km^{2} (151 sq mi)
- Elevation: 1,320 m (4,330 ft)

Population (Census 2018)
  - Total: 13,595
  - Density: 34.8/km^{2} (90.1/sq mi)
- Time zone: UTC-5 (Colombia Standard Time)

Cañasgordas is a town and municipality in Antioquia Department, Colombia. The population was 13,595 at the 2018 census.

== Climate ==
Cañasgordas has a tropical rainforest climate (Af) with heavy rainfall year-round.

Climate data for Cañasgordas, elevation 1,200 m (3,900 ft), (1981–2010)
Month	Jan	Feb	Mar	Apr	May	Jun	Jul	Aug	Sep	Oct	Nov	Dec	Year
Mean daily maximum °C (°F)	27.1 (80.8)	27.6 (81.7)	27.5 (81.5)	26.9 (80.4)	26.6 (79.9)	26.7 (80.1)	27.0 (80.6)	27.3 (81.1)	27.0 (80.6)	26.1 (79.0)	26.1 (79.0)	26.5 (79.7)	26.8 (80.2)
Daily mean °C (°F)	21.6 (70.9)	21.7 (71.1)	21.8 (71.2)	21.7 (71.1)	21.6 (70.9)	21.7 (71.1)	21.7 (71.1)	21.7 (71.1)	21.5 (70.7)	21.1 (70.0)	21.2 (70.2)	21.4 (70.5)	21.5 (70.7)
Mean daily minimum °C (°F)	16.0 (60.8)	16.2 (61.2)	16.5 (61.7)	16.9 (62.4)	17.1 (62.8)	17.0 (62.6)	16.8 (62.2)	16.7 (62.1)	16.7 (62.1)	16.6 (61.9)	16.6 (61.9)	16.4 (61.5)	16.7 (62.1)
Average precipitation mm (inches)	90.1 (3.55)	96.3 (3.79)	140.7 (5.54)	244.9 (9.64)	273.9 (10.78)	203.6 (8.02)	158.3 (6.23)	177.3 (6.98)	262.7 (10.34)	308.5 (12.15)	289.2 (11.39)	150.7 (5.93)	2,396.2 (94.34)
Average precipitation days (≥ 1.0 mm)	11	10	13	19	21	17	17	16	20	24	21	14	202
Average relative humidity (%)	85	84	84	86	86	86	85	85	85	86	87	86	86
Mean monthly sunshine hours	167.4	146.8	145.7	108.0	114.7	129.0	148.8	139.5	120.0	111.6	123.0	139.5	1,594
Mean daily sunshine hours	5.4	5.2	4.7	3.6	3.7	4.3	4.8	4.5	4.0	3.6	4.1	4.5	4.4
Source: Instituto de Hidrologia Meteorologia y Estudios Ambientales
