= San Sebastián, Cauca =

- Municipality and town
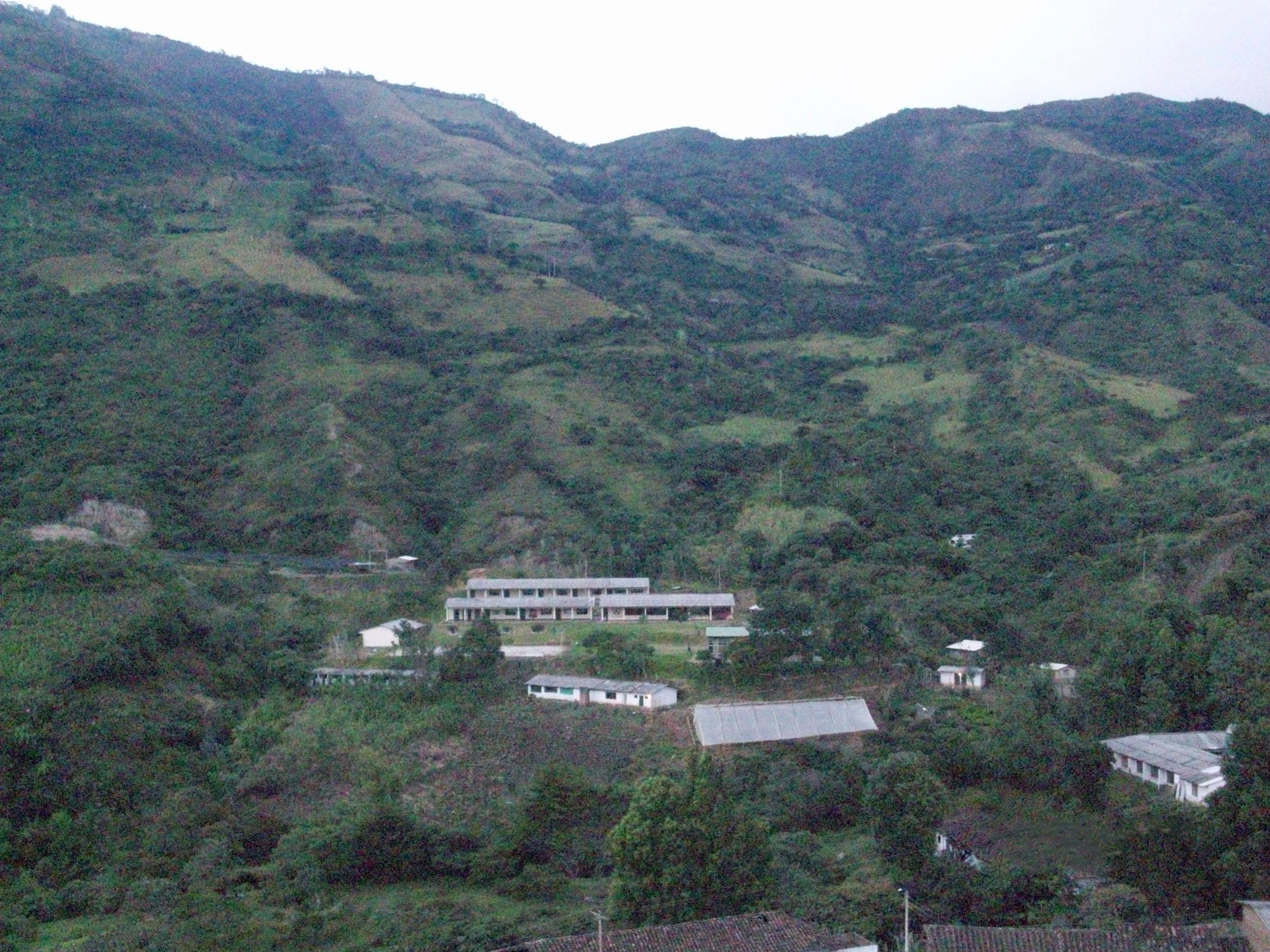
- View of San Sebastián, Cauca

- Flag Coat of arms

- Location of the municipality and town of San Sebastian, Cauca in the Cauca Department of Colombia.
- Coordinates: 1°50′38″N 76°46′18″W
- Country: Colombia
- Department: Cauca Department

Area
  - Total: 436 km^{2} (168 sq mi)

Population (Census 2018)
  - Total: 9,806
  - Density: 22.5/km^{2} (58.3/sq mi)
- Time zone: UTC-5 (Colombia Standard Time)
- Climate: Csb

San Sebastián is a town and municipality in the Cauca Department, Colombia at a distance of 165 km by road from the city of Popayán, capital city of the department of Cauca. The town was founded in 1562 by Pedro Antonio Gómez.

== History ==
It is believed that the town of San Sebastián was settled in the year 1582 by Pedro Antonio Gómez. However, research indicates that the lands in this region had been inhabited by the indigenous peoples since a time far back before the Hispanic foundation and it is not possible to establish clearly when it started.

== Administrative Division ==
The Municipality of San Sebastián has a municipal seat, known after the same name, but in the territorial administrative structure it is also called considered a corregiment, therefore the territory consists of seven corregiments which are subdivided into 50 veredas (hamlets), one legally constituted indigenous reservation of the Yanacona ethnic group, and a Papallaqta indigenous council in the corregimiento of Valencia. In addition to its capital, San Sebastián, the municipality has the following populated centers (corregimientos & Veredas) under its jurisdiction:

=== Corregimientos & Veredas ===
- San Sebastián
  - Alto Mu, La Marquesa, Laguna Negra, La Granja, Las Minas, Loma Grande, Ingenio Samango.
- El Rosal
  - Alto Potrerillo, Bajo Potrerillo, Costancillas, Domingote, Higuerones, Naranjos, La Laguna, Porvenir, Pueblo Viejo, Rodeo, Valle de Jambimbal
- Marmato
  - Bellavista, Esperanza, Florida
- Paramillos
  - El Tuno, Hatos, Pantano, La Cusumbe, Nuevo Horizonte, Tapias.
- Santiago
  - Cigarras, EL Chilco El Guarango, El Tambo, El Trilladero, Guacas, Hatillo, Piedra Blanca, La Pradera, Popayáncito,
- Valencia
  - Delicias, Encino, Guacas, La Aguada, La Entrada, La Oyola, Porvenir, Río Negro Caquetá.
- 'Venecia
  - Campo Alegre, Cerrillos, Cruz Chiquita, Garrizal, Paraíso, Santander.

== Climate ==
Climate data for San Sebastián (Valencia), elevation 2,900 m (9,500 ft), (1981–2010)
Month	Jan	Feb	Mar	Apr	May	Jun	Jul	Aug	Sep	Oct	Nov	Dec	Year
Mean daily maximum °C (°F)	17.0 (62.6)	16.9 (62.4)	16.6 (61.9)	16.6 (61.9)	16.6 (61.9)	15.5 (59.9)	14.8 (58.6)	14.6 (58.3)	15.5 (59.9)	16.2 (61.2)	16.4 (61.5)	16.5 (61.7)	16.1 (61.0)
Daily mean °C (°F)	10.8 (51.4)	11.0 (51.8)	11.1 (52.0)	11.1 (52.0)	11.2 (52.2)	10.6 (51.1)	10.0 (50.0)	10.0 (50.0)	10.3 (50.5)	10.7 (51.3)	10.9 (51.6)	11.0 (51.8)	10.7 (51.3)
Mean daily minimum °C (°F)	5.1 (41.2)	5.6 (42.1)	5.9 (42.6)	6.4 (43.5)	6.8 (44.2)	6.4 (43.5)	6.2 (43.2)	5.8 (42.4)	5.2 (41.4)	5.4 (41.7)	5.9 (42.6)	5.6 (42.1)	5.8 (42.4)
Average precipitation mm (inches)	76.1 (3.00)	71.8 (2.83)	84.8 (3.34)	103 (4.1)	94.0 (3.70)	83.7 (3.30)	99.1 (3.90)	71.2 (2.80)	56.2 (2.21)	111.1 (4.37)	115.1 (4.53)	99.8 (3.93)	1,065.8 (41.96)
Average precipitation days	15	14	17	20	21	21	22	20	17	18	19	17	217
Average relative humidity (%)	84	83	84	84	84	84	85	85	84	84	85	84	84
Mean monthly sunshine hours	117.8	93.2	83.7	69.0	71.3	75.0	80.6	83.7	84.0	86.8	90.0	108.5	1,043.6
Mean daily sunshine hours	3.8	3.3	2.7	2.3	2.3	2.5	2.6	2.7	2.8	2.8	3.0	3.5	2.9
Source: Instituto de Hidrologia Meteorologia y Estudios Ambientales
