= Cañasgordas Fault =

Oblique thrust fault

- Falla de Cañasgordas
- Location within Colombia
- Etymology: Cañasgordas
- Coordinates: 06°48′14″N 76°04′55″W
- Country: Colombia
- Region: Andean
- State: Antioquia
- Cities: Dabeiba

Characteristics
- Range: Western Ranges, Andes
- Part of: Andean oblique faults
- Length: 54.8 km (34.1 mi)
- Strike: 316 ± 4
- Dip: Southwest
- Dip angle: High
- Displacement: ~0.01–0.1 mm (0.00039–0.00394 in)/yr

Tectonics
- Plate: North Andean
- Status: Inactive
- Type: Oblique thrust fault
- Movement: Reverse sinistral
- Age: Quaternary
- Orogeny: Andean

The Cañasgordas Fault (Spanish: Falla de Cañasgordas) is an oblique thrust fault in the department of Antioquia in northwestern Colombia. The fault has a total length of 54.8 kilometres (34.1 mi) and runs along an average northwest to southeast strike of 316 ± 4 in the Western Ranges of the Colombian Andes.

== Etymology ==
The fault is named after the town of Cañasgordas.

== Description ==
The Cañasgordas Fault is located to the northwest of the city of Medellín. The fault traverses most of the Western Ranges of the Colombian Andes between the towns of Dabeiba and Giraldo in the department of Antioquia. The Cañasgordas Fault probably joins the Mutatá Fault. The fault displaces Cretaceous sedimentary and volcanic rocks, Tertiary sedimentary rocks, and Quaternary mud flows. The fault forms strong linear features on satellite images and aerial photographs and controls the course of the Río Sucio, which has a prominent, linear V-shaped valley. Fault scarps are formed on Quaternary mud flows. The slip rate is estimated at 0.01 to 0.1 millimetres (0.00039 to 0.00394 in) per year deduced from offset of mud flows and the fault was probably active in the Late Pleistocene.

== See also ==
- List of earthquakes in Colombia
- Romeral Fault System
