= Armenia Fault =

- Falla de Armenia
- Location within Colombia
- Etymology: Armenia
- Coordinates: 04°28′45″N 75°42′21″W
- Country: Colombia
- Region: Andean
- State: Quindío
- Cities: Armenia

Characteristics
- Range: Central Ranges, Andes
- Part of: Romeral Fault System
- Length: ~32 km (20 mi)
- Strike: 023.2 ± 11
- Dip: Very high
- Dip angle: West
- Displacement: 0.1 mm (0.0039 in)/yr

Tectonics
- Plate: North Andean
- Status: Active
- Type: Oblique strike-slip fault
- Movement: Normal sinistral
- Age: Quaternary
- Orogeny: Andean

The Armenia Fault (Spanish: Falla de Armenia) is an oblique sinistral strike-slip fault in the department of Quindío in west-central Colombia. The fault is part of the megaregional Romeral Fault System and has a total length of approximately 32 kilometres (20 mi) and runs along an average northwest to southeast strike of 023.2 ± 11 in the Central Ranges of the Colombian Andes. The fault shows Holocene activity with a surface rupture produced in 2001.

== Etymology ==
The fault is named after Armenia, the capital of Quindío.

== Description ==
The Armenia Fault is part of the Romeral Fault System on the western slope of the Central Ranges of the Colombian Andes. The fault crosses the city of Armenia and displaces Pliocene to Pleistocene volcanic and volcano-sedimentary deposits of the Quindío Fan (Spanish: Abanico del Quindío), which covers about 400 square kilometres (150 sq mi). The geometric and neotectonic features of the Montenegro and Armenia Faults are very similar.

The fault forms well-developed fault scarp as much as 50 metres (160 ft) high, characterised by beheaded streams, ponded alluvium, aligned and offset drainages, soil and rock slides on the face of the scarp, and localised tilting of terrain. The Armenia Fault deforms Quaternary volcano-sedimentary debris flow and pyroclastic flow deposits. The valley of the Quindío River follows the strike of the Armenia Fault.

=== Activity ===
The fault is considered active with Holocene tectonic movement. A trench opened in April 2001 near Circasia, about 20 kilometres (12 mi) north of Armenia, indicating that the fault last movement is younger than 4,820 years (and probably less than 3,000 years) based on a previously dated bed of lapilli that was erupted by the Machín volcano. A maximum moment magnitude of 6.5 to 6.8 and a recurrence interval of 1000 years is estimated for this fault, based on the length of Quaternary rupture and displacement of topographic features at the fault.

== See also ==
- List of earthquakes in Colombia
- Córdoba-Navarco Fault
