= Buesaco-Aranda Fault =

Strike-slip fault in Nariño, Colombia

- Falla Buesaco-Aranda
- Location within Colombia
- Etymology: Buesaco & vereda Aranda
- Coordinates: 01°20′14.3″N 77°11′36.8″W
- Country: Colombia
- Region: Andean
- State: Nariño
- Cities: Pasto

Characteristics
- Range: Central Ranges, Andes
- Part of: Romeral Fault System
- Length: 29 km (18 mi)
- Strike: NE-SW
- Dip: Vertical
- Displacement: 1–5 mm (0.039–0.197 in)/yr

Tectonics
- Plate: North Andean
- Status: Active
- Earthquakes: 1995 Pasto (M_{L} 5.0)
- Type: Strike-slip fault
- Movement: Dextral
- Age: Quaternary
- Orogeny: Andean

The Buesaco-Aranda Fault (Spanish: Falla Buesaco-Aranda) is a dextral strike-slip fault in the department of Nariño in southwestern Colombia. The fault has a total length of 29 kilometres (18 mi) and runs along an average northeast to southwest strike in the Central Ranges of the Colombian Andes. The 1995 Pasto earthquake is associated with the active fault showing high amounts of displacement. The earthquake caused seven fatalities.

== Etymology ==
The fault is named after Buesaco and Aranda, a vereda of Pasto. Other sources call the fault by the general name of Silvia-Pijao Fault.

== Description ==
The Buesaco-Aranda Fault, extends in a north-northeast to northeast direction from near the Galeras Volcano in southwestern Colombia. The Buesaco Fault is located 5 kilometres (3.1 mi) to the west of the Aranda Fault. On the eastern block of the Buesaco Fault, the basement rock consists of basic volcanic, andesite and dark sedimentary rocks which probably developed in a marginal basin environment during Early Cretaceous time. On the western block of the fault are a group of low-grade metamorphic rocks which consist of greenschist, amphibolite, quartzite and black schist, all of Paleozoic age. The area is mostly covered by a Pliocene blanket of pyroclastic rocks and calc-alkaline lavas, Quaternary lahar deposits and fluvio-glacial deposits.

The Buesaco-Aranda Fault has a very well-defined fault trace, with strongly deformed landforms of Pleistocene-Holocene age, clear breaks in slope along eroded fault scarps, and fault scarps facing both to the southeast or the northwest, which is a characteristic of strike-slip faults. Systematic right lateral deflections of some stream gullies, river channels, and ridges are visible. Offset features in confined alluvial deposits and in recent alluvial fans have fresh scarp morphology. The net cumulative horizontal slip calculated is 188 ± 14 metres (617 ± 46 ft), with 160 ± 10 metres (525 ± 33 ft) of displacement in offset landforms along the Aranda Fault. The Morasurco volcano is enclosed by the Buesaco and Aranda Fault segments.

=== Activity ===
The last strong seismic event occurred on the Buesaco Fault near Pasto at 18:23 on March 4, 1995; the magnitude of the biggest shock was M 5.0. Seven people died as a result of the earthquake and the aftershocks.

== See also ==
- List of earthquakes in Colombia
- Paraíso Fault
