= El Rosal, Cauca =

Village in Colombia

El Rosal
- Populated center
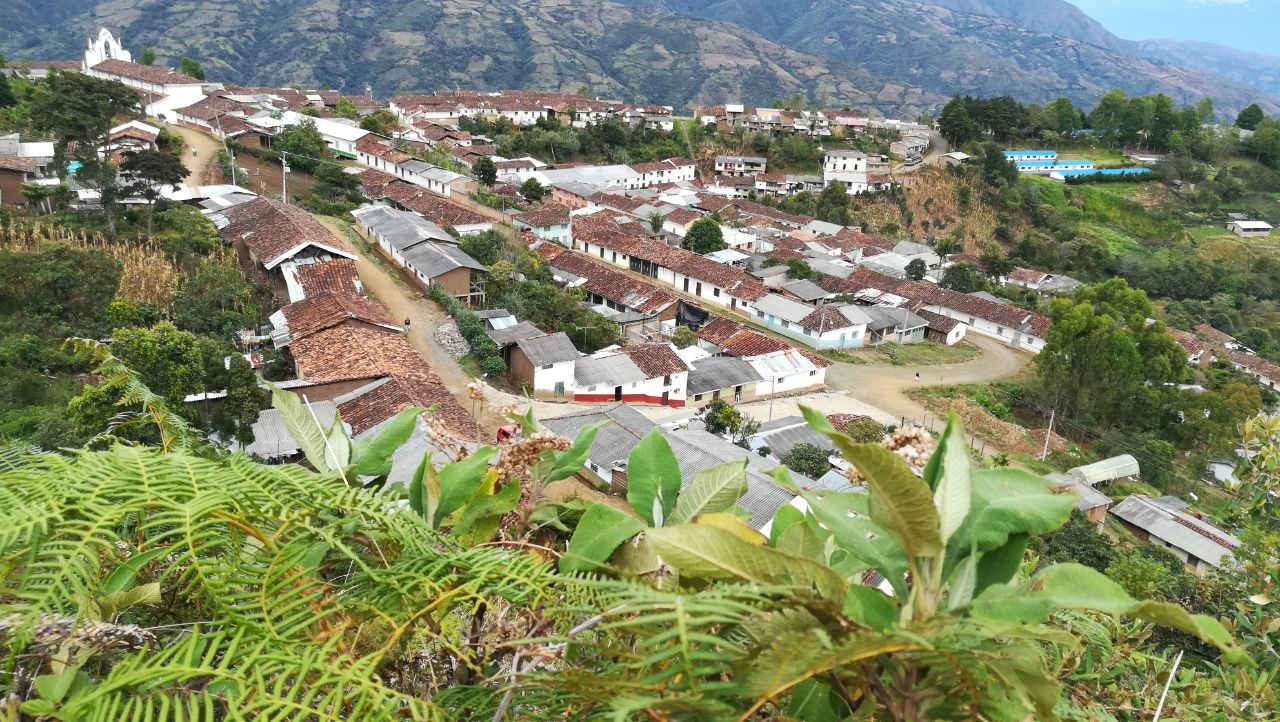

- Location within Colombia
- Coordinates: 1°47′02″N 76°49′40″W
- Country: Colombia
- Department: Cauca
- Municipality: San Sebastian

Population
  - Total: 2,157 (2,018)

El Rosal is a populated center of Colombia of the municipality of San Sebastián in the Cauca department located on the Colombian Massif. El Rosal limits to the north with the municipality of Almaguer, to the south with the municipality of Santa Rosa, to the east with the Lerma hill and to the west with the municipality of Bolívar; It has important water sources such as the Ramos River from its source downstream to its mouth in the San Jorge River, to the west with the Hato Frío River.

== History ==
Before being named El Rosal in 1710, it was called San Juan de Iscansé because it was located near the Ramos River above the small Iscancé Valley, however, its name changed in obedience to a religious event (like in most of the towns in the Colombian Massif), whereby, according to popular belief, the Virgin of Rosary appeared in the town, the place of her appearance determined the location where the Parish of El Rosal was to be built (where it remains today) and with it the first hamlet with walls of bahareque and straw roofs. The territories of the Colombian massif where El Rosal is located were reduced to reservations at the end of the conquest, with the purpose of protecting the few lands that were left to the indigenous people; The lands of the reservations during the colonial period They were always desired by clerics and residents, and defended bushel by bushel by the locals to avoid the usurpation that ended up being imposed, the indigenous people of the region did not inherit the land, but the disputes over it. El Rosal was a colonial indigenous resguardo that became extinct around year 1882 — without land distribution— and its indigenous council (cabildo) remained until around 1924, when the new church was completed. However, and despite the disappearance of the resguardo, collective memory has remained among its inhabitants, not only as oral memory, but as ritual memory.

== Communications ==
El Rosal can be reached by car along the road that begins at the Pan-American highway in El Bordo, in the direction of Guachicono and Bolívar. After eight or nine hours of travel on an unpaved road, which goes up and down mountains passing through all the Andean thermal floors, to reach the town; From there it is possible to return to the Pan-American Highway using the road that goes to the town of Rosas, after crossing the Yanakuna territories of Santiago, Guachicono and Río Blanco.

== Geography ==
El Rosal sits on a small plateau called Iscancé Valley in the middle of the broken geography of the Colombian Massif, surrounded by mountains that dangerously end in gorges and ravines that descend into deep canyons washed by rapid creeks.
