= Argelia Velez-Rodriguez =

Cuban-American mathematician and educator

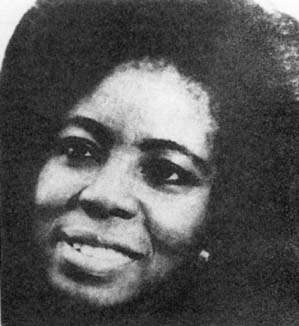
- Born: 1936 (age 89–90); Havana, Cuba

Academic background
- Education: Marianao Institute; University of Havana
- Thesis: Determination of Orbits Using Talcott's Method (1960)

Argelia Velez-Rodriguez (born 1936) is a Cuban-American mathematician and educator. She was the first Black woman to earn a doctorate in mathematics in Cuba.

== Early life ==
When Argelia Velez-Rodriguez was growing up, her father worked in the government under Cuba's leader, Fulgencio Batista. At the start of Batista's governing, he improved the Cuban educational system. Her family was Catholic, so she was educated in Catholic primary and secondary schools. During her schooling, teachers noticed her interest in mathematics, and she won a mathematic competition at age 9.

== Education ==
Velez-Rodriguez obtained her bachelor's degree at the Marianao Institute in 1955. She continued her studies at the University of Havana earning a Ph.D in 1960. Her instructors at these institutions were women with doctorates in mathematics. Only a small percentage of the Cuban population was black, so although all of her instructors were women with doctorates in mathematics, she would be the first black woman to earn a doctorate in Cuba. According to a quote from Velez-Rodriguez, she did not experience racial discrimination in Cuba. The only time she did was at places that were owned or controlled by the United States. Her doctoral studies consisted of differential equations and astronomical orbits, and her dissertation was the Determination of Orbits Using Talcott's Method where she earned her PhD in mathematics in 1960 with a dissertation on the application of differential equations to astronomy entitled "Determination of Orbits Using Talcott's Method".

== Career ==
In 1962, she decided to emigrate to the United States with her son and her daughter, followed by her husband three years later. Texas College is where she held first United States teaching position in 1962, and she taught math and physics. By 1972, she was a professor at Bishop College in Texas, and she was a department chair for mathematics from 1975–1978. She left Bishop in 1979 and was hired by the National Science Foundation to work with the Minority Science Improvement Program. In 1980 she was hired by the U.S. Department of Education to direct the Minority Science Improvement Program.
