= 1999 Colombia earthquake =

6.2-magnitude earthquake in Colombia

- Location within Colombia
- UTC time: 1999-01-25 18:19:18
- ISC event: 1443400
- USGS-ANSS: ComCat
- Local date: January 25, 1999
- Local time: 13:19:18 COT
- Magnitude: 6.2 M_{w}
- Depth: 17 km (11 mi)
- Epicenter: 4.461°N 75.724°W
- Areas affected: Colombia
- Max. intensity: MMI X (Extreme)
- Peak acceleration: 0.55 g
- Casualties: 1,900 dead, 4,000 injured, 3,900 missing

The 1999 Colombia earthquake occurred on 25 January 1999 at 13:19 with an epicenter 40 kilometers (25 mi) west southwest of Ibagué, Colombia. The shock heavily affected the city of Armenia in the Quindío department, and about 18 other towns and 28 additional villages in the Colombian Coffee-Growers Axis region departments, and to a lesser degree, the cities of Pereira and Manizales. The earthquake had a magnitude of 6.2 on the moment magnitude scale and was the strongest earthquake to strike Colombia in 16 years.

== Cause ==
This area has a well known high seismic risk, due to the triple junction that occurs at the northwest corner of the South American plate where the Nazca, Cocos, and Pacific plates converge. About 60% of the existent poorly engineered structures in Armenia collapsed, due to the high number of old structures, built without technical requirements and the lack of urban planning and land studies.

== Damage ==
The earthquake hit Colombia's coffee-growing region, and toppled tower blocks, hotels, and historic churches in Armenia. Most of the buildings that collapsed were old and poorly constructed, or were built on poor soil such as old landfill sites or steep slopes. The newer structures, for the most part, survived intact due to building codes established in 1984. The worst hit part of the country were regional capitals of Armenia and Pereira. In Armenia, about 16 km (10 mi) south of the epicentre, single-story homes were demolished.

The mainshock produced a rough casualty estimate of about 1,000 people. The first (17:40) aftershock produced a still indeterminate number of victims among the people trying to remove their goods from the semi-collapsed structures. The corpses that were retrieved were carried to the local University of Quindío auditorium to be identified by their relatives. Since the forensic services were out, many of them could not be recognized and were buried in common tombs.

The structures of many hospitals were damaged, and the resources available for health care were insufficient even before the event. Furthermore, the area had limited reaction plans for disasters and little experience with triage. As a consequence, the attention to the victims was chaotic. About 4,000 people with various degrees of lesions were attended to in the remaining health care centers of the city. An undetermined number of injured victims (many of them unidentified) were carried by airplane to different cities (mainly Bogotá, Medellín, and Cali), and out of the country.

The number of missing people as a result of the earthquake is estimated to be near 3,900. Some factors involved in the disappearance of these people are the security issues due to the riots, the collapse of communications and roads, the lack of coordination of the rescue forces, dispatch of the injured victims and identification of the corpses. Mainly the injuries in the earthquakes were made by collapsing buildings which broke bones, caused concussions, bruises, cuts and many more injuries.

== Aftershocks ==
A shock occurred at 15:40 (22:40 UTC) with a magnitude of 5.4 on the Richter scale. Other aftershocks that caused panic among the inhabitants were on January 29 at 23:33 (M4.2) and January 31 at 03:03 (M3.5)

== Response ==
Colombian authorities imposed a dawn-till-dusk curfew to allow rescue workers to work unhindered. Looting was widespread in Armenia after residents, disturbed by the slow movement of the relief effort, broke into food stores and stole supplies. Then Colombian president Andrés Pastrana postponed a trip to a World Bank meeting in Germany to view the destruction himself. He later sent soldiers to the afflicted area to restore order.

== Aftermath ==
The main economic activity of the region, the Colombian coffee industry was heavily affected. About 8,000 coffee farms were completely or partially destroyed, and 13,000 structures of several kinds of enterprises and industries were damaged and went temporarily or permanently out of service. The banks and financial entities could not dispense money for several weeks.

In January 2002 the new community of El Cantaro was finished. Many of the 125 families that gathered to celebrate the completion of their homes were chosen from among the neediest. An ecological park was created further down the eponymous stream.

== See also ==
- 2026 Colombia earthquake
- List of earthquakes in 1999
- List of earthquakes in Colombia
