= Romeral (volcano) =

Volcano in Colombia

- Volcán Romeral
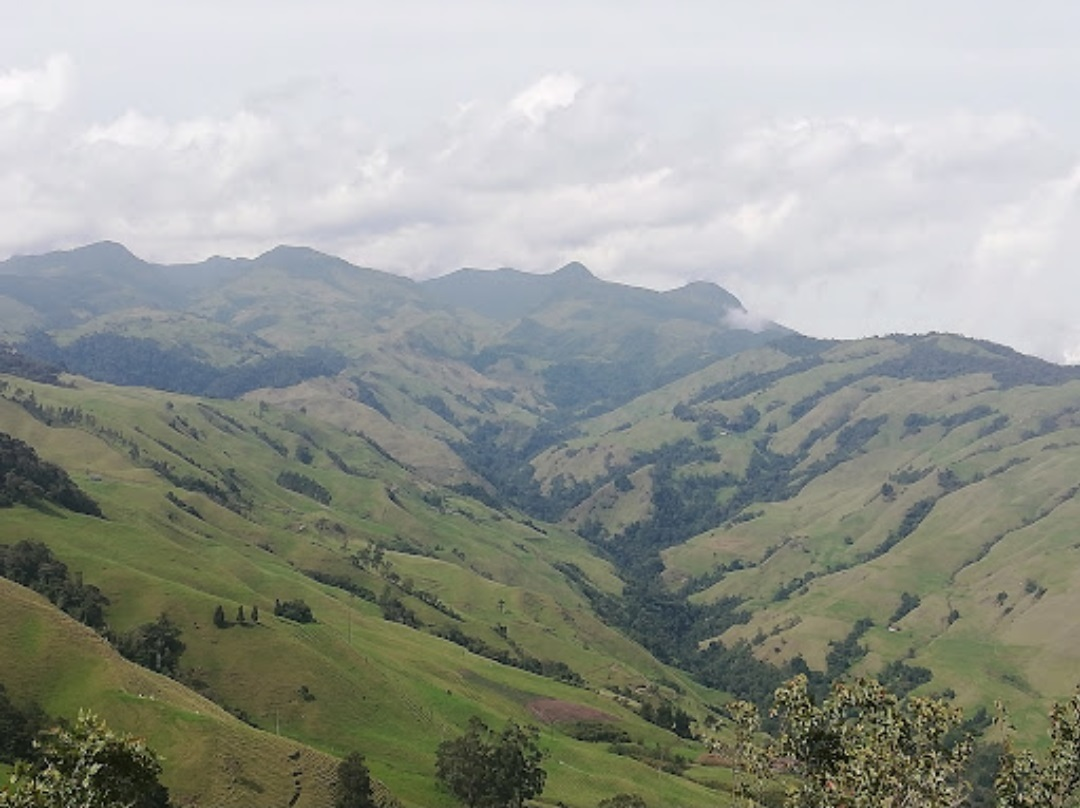
- Romeral

Highest point
- Elevation: 3,858 m (12,657 ft)
- Listing: Volcanoes of Colombia
- Coordinates: 5°12′22″N 75°21′50″W

Geography
- Location within Colombia
- Location: Caldas, Colombia
- Parent range: Central Ranges, Andes

Geology
- Rock age: Pliocene-Holocene
- Mountain type: Andesitic-dacitic stratovolcano
- Last eruption: 5390 BCE ± 500 years

Romeral is a stratovolcano located in Caldas, Colombia. It is the northernmost Holocene volcano of South America, of the North Volcanic Zone in the Andean Volcanic Belt. The volcano was formed in the Late Pliocene, approximately 3 million years ago.

== See also ==
- List of volcanoes in Colombia
- List of volcanoes by elevation
