= Argelia Fault =

- Falla de Argelia
- Location within Colombia
- Etymology: Argelia
- Coordinates: 04°51′44″N 75°57′09″W
- Country: Colombia
- Region: Andean
- State: Risaralda, Valle del Cauca

Characteristics
- Range: Western Ranges, Andes
- Part of: Andean oblique faults
- Length: 59.4 km (36.9 mi)
- Strike: 014.5 ± 18
- Dip: West
- Dip angle: Moderate to high
- Displacement: <0.2 mm (0.0079 in)/yr

Tectonics
- Plate: North Andean
- Status: Inactive
- Type: Oblique thrust fault
- Movement: Dextral reverse
- Age: Quaternary
- Orogeny: Andean

The Argelia Fault (Spanish: Falla de Argelia) is an inactive dextral oblique thrust fault in the departments of Risaralda and Valle del Cauca in Colombia. The fault has a total length of 59.4 kilometres (36.9 mi) and runs along an average north to south strike of 014.5 ± 18 in the Western Ranges of the Colombian Andes.

== Etymology ==
The fault is named after Argelia, Valle del Cauca.

== Description ==
The Argelia Fault is located in the Western Ranges of the Colombian Andes, to the west of the city of Pereira. The fault cuts Mesozoic oceanic rocks that were accreted to the continent during Late Cretaceous time. The Argelia Fault shows some neotectonic features and probably connects with the Garrapatas Fault.

The vertical component of the fault is west-side up. Dextral movement in this fault is an exception to the common sinistral (left-lateral) movement of north–south trending faults in the region.

== See also ==
- List of earthquakes in Colombia
- Romeral Fault System
