= Paraíso Fault =

Geological fault in Colombia

- Falla de Paraíso, Palmira-Buga Fault
- Location within Colombia
- Etymology: Hacienda El Paraíso, Palmira, Buga
- Coordinates: 03°34′37″N 76°18′18″W
- Country: Colombia
- Region: Andean
- State: Valle del Cauca
- Cities: Buga, Palmira

Characteristics
- Range: Central Ranges
- Part of: Romeral Fault System
- Segments: North and south
- Length: 35.3 km (21.9 mi)
- Strike: 012.5 ± 3
- Dip: East to northeast
- Dip angle: Variable from 12 to 30
- Displacement: 0.2–1 mm (0.0079–0.0394 in)/yr

Tectonics
- Plate: North Andean
- Status: Active
- Type: Thrust fault
- Movement: Reverse, minor dextral
- Age: Quaternary
- Orogeny: Andean

The Paraíso Fault or Palmira-Buga Fault (Spanish: Falla de Paraíso, Falla de Palmira-Buga) is a thrust fault with minor dextral lateral movement in the department of Valle del Cauca in southwestern Colombia. The fault is part of the megaregional Romeral Fault System and has a total length of 35.3 kilometres (21.9 mi) and runs along an average north-northwest to south-southeast strike of 012.5 ± 3 in the Cauca Basin and the Central Ranges of the Colombian Andes.

== Etymology ==
The fault is named after hacienda El Paraíso. An alternative name is Palmira-Buga Fault.

== Description ==
The Paraiso Fault is part of the Romeral Fault System in southwestern Colombia. It is located at the western slope of the Central Ranges, east of the city of Palmira. The fault displaces alluvial fans and debris flows on the eastern border of the Valle del Cauca Department. North of the Amaime River, the fault seems to be more active in late Quaternary than the portion south of the river.

The Paraiso Fault is concave to the east and shows an outstanding linear trace for more than 20 kilometres (12 mi). The fault is divided in two portions: the southern portion, about 15 kilometres (9.3 mi) long, is located to the south of the Amaime River; the northern part extends about 7 kilometres (4.3 mi) north of the river. Geographic expression suggests that the northern portion is more active than the southern one. The fault is characterised by a series of discontinuous short sinuous scarps of about 1 to 2 kilometres (0.62 to 1.24 mi) long. The height of the scarps varies from 2 to 10 metres (6.6 to 32.8 ft).

=== Activity ===
The fault is considered active with Holocene tectonic movement. Two trenches were opened in the northern part of the fault: the Venecia and Piedechinche trenches, each of which show Holocene tectonic deformation. Movement is well-defined as early Holocene, it is younger than 6,320 yr as determined from C-14 ages of folded paleosoils sampled in the Venecia trench.

== See also ==
- List of earthquakes in Colombia
- Romeral Fault System
- Geology of Colombia
- Geology of the Andes
- Andes
- Thrust fault
- Strike-slip fault
- Fault (geology)
- Holocene
- Valle del Cauca Department
