= Rosas, Cauca =

Coordinates: 2°16′N 76°45′W

- Municipality and town
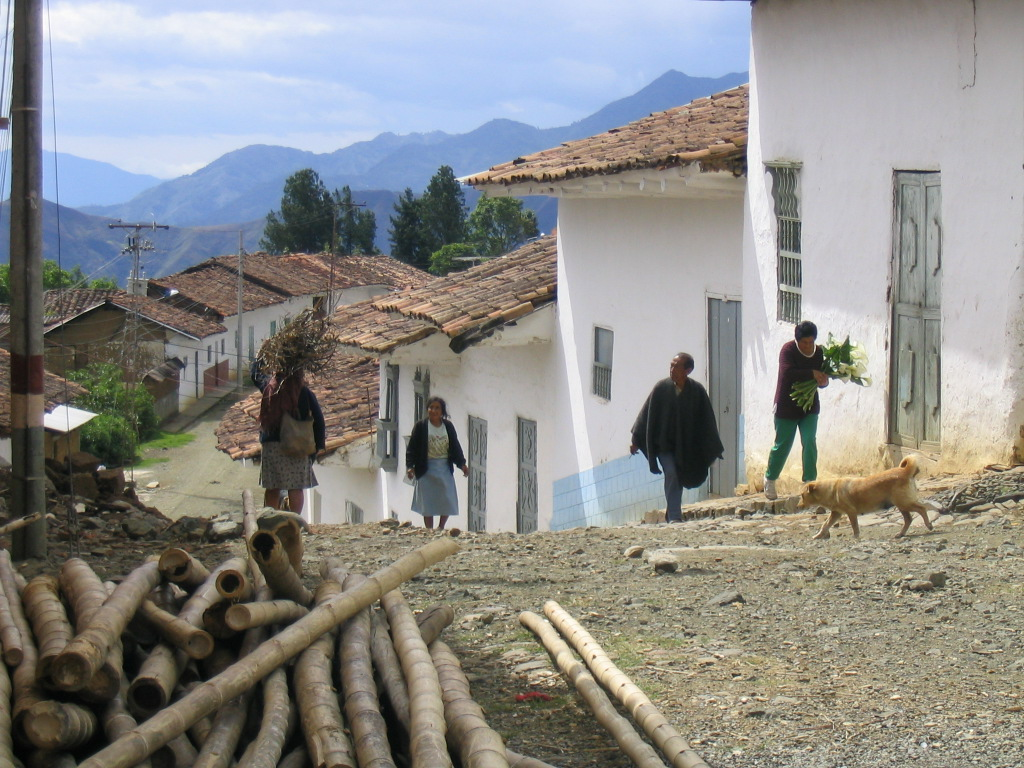
- Street of Rosas

- Flag Coat of arms

- Location of the municipality and town of Rosas, Cauca in the Cauca Department of Colombia.
- Country: Colombia
- Department: Cauca Department

Area
  - Total: 197 km^{2} (76 sq mi)

Population (Census 2018)
  - Total: 9,336
  - Density: 47.4/km^{2} (123/sq mi)
- Time zone: UTC-5 (Colombia Standard Time)
- Climate: Cfb

Rosas (Spanish pronunciation: [ˈrosas]) is a town and municipality in the Cauca Department, Colombia.
