= Montenegro Fault =

- Falla de Montenegro
- Location within Colombia
- Etymology: Montenegro
- Coordinates: 04°31′00″N 75°46′32″W
- Country: Colombia
- Region: Andean
- State: Quindío

Characteristics
- Range: Central Ranges, Andes
- Part of: Romeral Fault System
- Length: 21.7 km (13.5 mi)
- Strike: 025.1 ± 9
- Dip: West
- Dip angle: High
- Displacement: 0.1 mm (0.0039 in)/yr

Tectonics
- Plate: North Andean
- Status: Inactive
- Type: Oblique-slip fault strike-slip fault
- Movement: Normal sinistral
- Age: Quaternary
- Orogeny: Andean

The Montenegro Fault (Spanish: Falla de Montenegro) is an oblique sinistral strike-slip fault in the department of Quindío in west-central Colombia. The fault is part of the megaregional Romeral Fault System and has a total length of 21.7 kilometres (13.5 mi) and runs along an average northwest to southeast strike of 025.1 ± 9 in the Central Ranges of the Colombian Andes.

== Etymology ==
The fault is named after Montenegro, Quindío.

== Description ==
The 21.7 kilometres (13.5 mi) Montenegro Fault is part of the Romeral Fault System, running through the western slope of the Central Ranges. The fault is located to the west of the city of Armenia. The fault crosscuts and deforms the Pleistocene volcanic and volcano-sedimentary deposits of the Quindío Fan (Spanish: Abanico del Quindío), which covers about 400 square kilometres (150 sq mi).

The Montenegro Fault forms outstanding fault scarps as much as 60 metres (200 ft) in height, beheaded streams, hanging valleys, ponded alluvium, aligned and offset drainages, as well as soil and rock slides on the face of the scarps. The fault deforms Quaternary volcanic debris flows and ash deposits. The Espejo River follows the strike of the Montenegro Fault.

== See also ==
- List of earthquakes in Colombia
- Armenia Fault
