= Argelia, Valle del Cauca =

Argelia
- Municipality and town
- Flag Coat of arms

- Location of the municipality and town of Argelia, Valle del Cauca in the Valle del Cauca Department of Colombia.

- Location in Colombia
- Coordinates: 4°40′N 76°40′W
- Country: Colombia
- Department: Valle del Cauca Department

Area
  - Total: 87 km^{2} (34 sq mi)
- Elevation: 1,560 m (5,120 ft)

Population (2015)
  - Total: 6,440
- Time zone: UTC-5 (Colombia Standard Time)
- Climate: Af

Argelia is a town and municipality located in the Department of Valle del Cauca, Colombia. The main means of income for this region is coffee.

Argelia was founded by the Ospina-Agi brothers, and are now recognized by a donkey statue for their great efforts in transporting goods by donkey up the jungle terrain and steep hills.

== Climate ==
Climate data for Argelia (Argelia El Recreo), elevation 1,600 m (5,200 ft), (1981–2010)
Month	Jan	Feb	Mar	Apr	May	Jun	Jul	Aug	Sep	Oct	Nov	Dec	Year
Mean daily maximum °C (°F)	26.8 (80.2)	27.3 (81.1)	26.8 (80.2)	26.5 (79.7)	26.4 (79.5)	26.7 (80.1)	26.6 (79.9)	27.0 (80.6)	26.6 (79.9)	26.1 (79.0)	26.1 (79.0)	26.5 (79.7)	26.6 (79.9)
Daily mean °C (°F)	20.6 (69.1)	20.7 (69.3)	20.6 (69.1)	20.5 (68.9)	20.5 (68.9)	20.6 (69.1)	20.4 (68.7)	20.6 (69.1)	20.5 (68.9)	20.1 (68.2)	20.3 (68.5)	20.4 (68.7)	20.4 (68.7)
Mean daily minimum °C (°F)	15.5 (59.9)	15.5 (59.9)	15.6 (60.1)	15.8 (60.4)	15.8 (60.4)	15.7 (60.3)	15.4 (59.7)	15.5 (59.9)	15.4 (59.7)	15.3 (59.5)	15.3 (59.5)	15.4 (59.7)	15.5 (59.9)
Average precipitation mm (inches)	79.8 (3.14)	80.3 (3.16)	112.9 (4.44)	170.1 (6.70)	167.7 (6.60)	106.5 (4.19)	94.9 (3.74)	86.4 (3.40)	126.5 (4.98)	184.0 (7.24)	148.2 (5.83)	91.8 (3.61)	1,438.7 (56.64)
Average precipitation days	12	12	15	19	20	14	13	13	17	22	20	14	184
Average relative humidity (%)	90	90	89	89	90	90	89	89	89	90	90	90	90
Mean monthly sunshine hours	124.0	110.1	114.7	111.0	114.7	126.0	161.2	161.2	126.0	105.4	105.0	111.6	1,470.9
Mean daily sunshine hours	4.0	3.9	3.7	3.7	3.7	4.2	5.2	5.2	4.2	3.4	3.5	3.6	4.0
Source: Instituto de Hidrologia Meteorologia y Estudios Ambientales
