= 1983 Popayán earthquake =

Natural disaster in Colombia

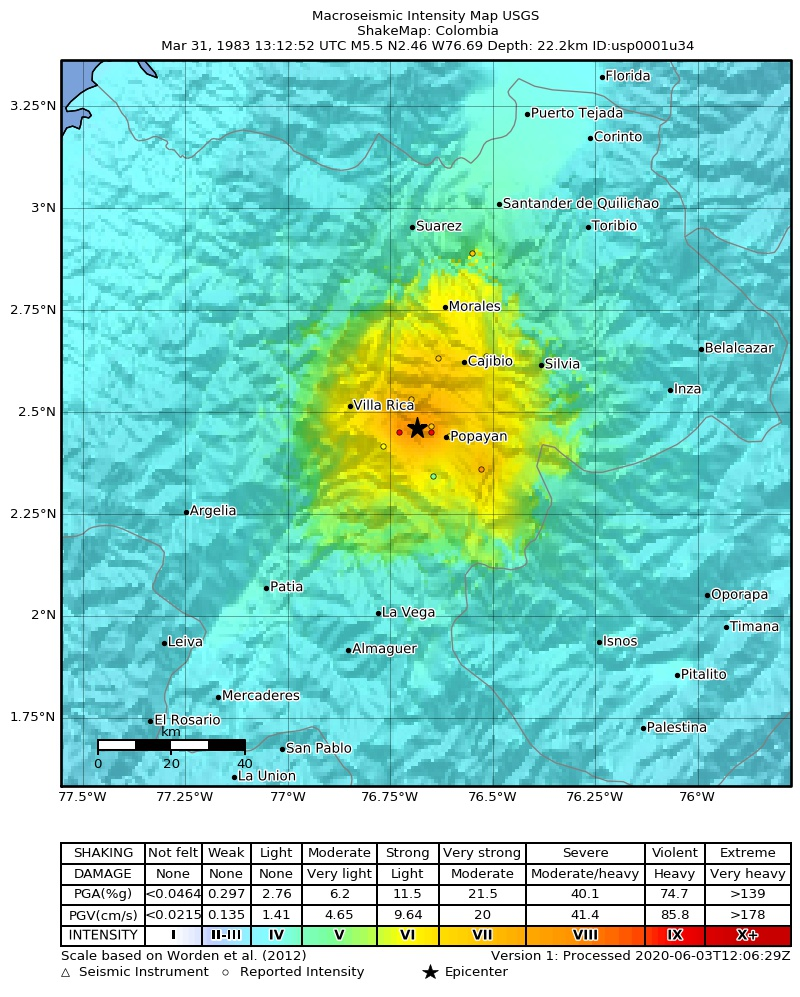
- USGS ShakeMap

- Location within Colombia
- UTC time: 1983-03-31 13:12:53
- ISC event: 581906
- USGS-ANSS: ComCat
- Local date: 31 March 1983
- Local time: 08:13 (UTC-5)
- Duration: 18–28 seconds
- Magnitude: 5.6 M_{w}
- Depth: 15 kilometers (9.3 mi)
- Epicenter: 2.461°N 76.686°W
- Areas affected: Popayán, Colombia
- Max. intensity: MMI VIII (Severe)
- Casualties: 267 killed

The 1983 Popayán earthquake (Spanish: El Terremoto de Popayán) occurred on 31 March in Popayán, Colombia. It had a moment magnitude of 5.6 with an epicenter south west of Popayán at a depth of 15 kilometers (9.3 mi). The earthquake killed 267 people and resulted in the passing of new laws requiring earthquake resistant building materials in zones at risk of tremors.

== Background ==
Popayán was founded in 1537 and had been renowned for its beauty and surviving examples of architecture from the Spanish colonial period. The city had already suffered natural disasters and had been destroyed on three occasions by an earthquake and two volcanic eruptions.

== Earthquake ==
The 1983 earthquake occurred at 08:13 on Maundy Thursday of that year. Although it lasted less than half a minute, damage to property was extensive and 267 people were killed, with a further 7,500 people injured. In total, 14,000 buildings were damaged, the majority of them in the city's historic centre. 6,885 of them suffered damage greater than 50 percent to the structure and a further 4,500 minor damage. 2,470 houses collapsed. Approximately $50 million of damage was caused. Serious damage was also caused to local infrastructure. The residents were left without electricity and water, communications were affected and the damage to the town's airport meant that it could only be used by helicopters and smaller planes. Many of the injured had to be airlifted to Cali, the nearest large city.

The quake also affected many of the neighbouring towns and regions and in Cajibio, at least ten people were killed.

== Aftermath ==
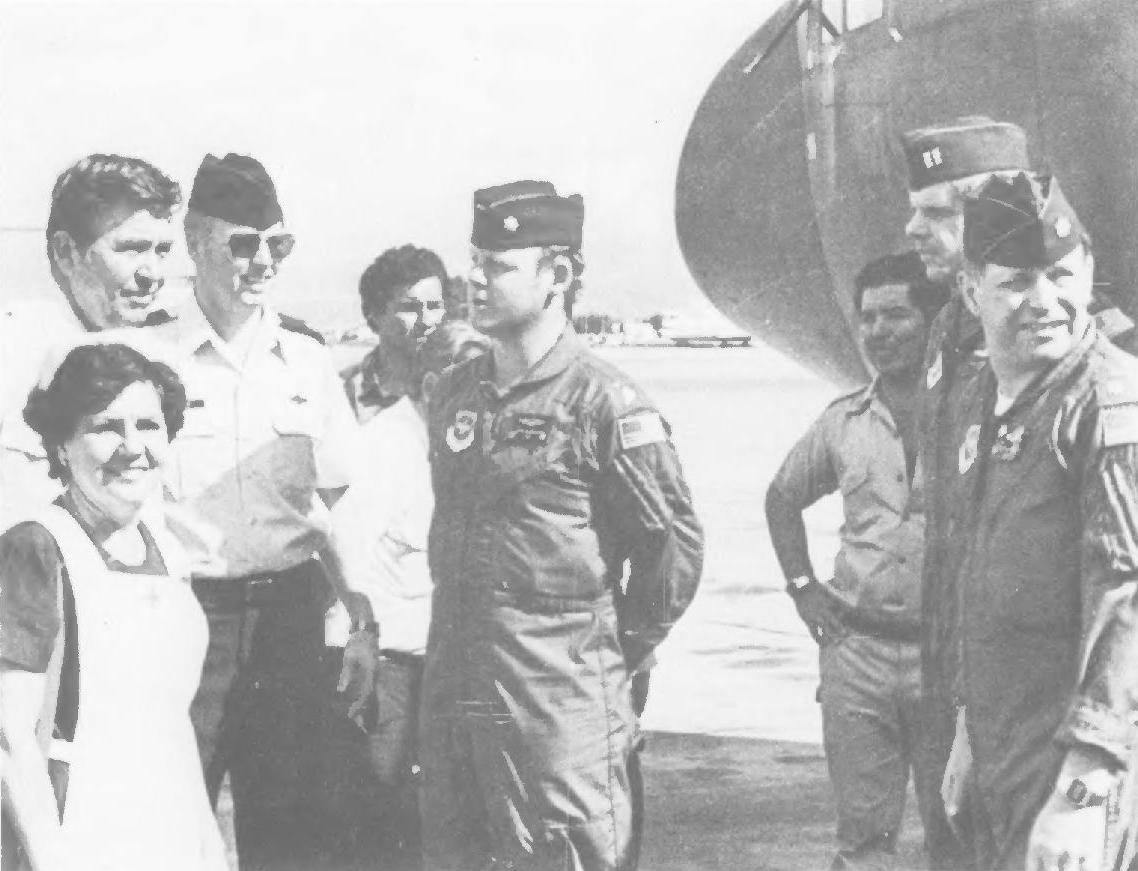
US Ambassador Thomas D. Boyatt receiving the first plane-load of American aid supplies in Popayan

The President of Colombia, Belisario Betancur, accompanied by other members of the government, visited the scene and attended the funerals which followed the disaster. The government responded by securing credit from the World Bank and earmarked $80 million for the city, with half of this to be used for reconstruction and the rest for economic regeneration.

Colombia also received assistance from other countries. The Spanish Red Cross sent material to help those injured, the Spanish government also offered assistance, while Venezuela sent a plane to provide medical assistance to the survivors and the United States sent material and medical supplies worth US$700,000.

Famous narcotics trafficker, Gonzalo Rodriguez Gacha, traveled to Popayán and gifted 200,000 dollars to victims of the disaster.

Many one and two-storey buildings which were damaged had been constructed using materials which could not resist earthquakes, based on a mistaken belief that these buildings would be unaffected by any earth tremors. Consequently, the following year, the Colombian government passed a new building code (Spanish: Código Colombiano de Construcciones Sismorresistentes) into legislation which required the construction of dwellings capable of resisting earthquakes. The Colombian Seismic Network was also created, tasked with monitoring seismic changes.
