= Romeral fault system =

Colombian fault system

- Sistema de Fallas (de) Romeral
- Location within Colombia
- Etymology: Romeral Volcano
- Coordinates: 04°31′36″N 75°40′48″W
- Country: Colombia
- Region: Andean, Caribbean
- State: Bolívar, Sucre, Córdoba, Antioquia, Caldas, Cauca, Quindío, Risaralda, Valle del Cauca, Nariño
- Cities: Sincelejo, Medellín, Manizales, Armenia, Pereira, Palmira, Cali, Popayán, Pasto

Characteristics
- Range: Central Ranges, Andes
- Part of: Andean megaregional fault systems
- Segments: Romeral Lineament, Cauca-Almaguer, Sabanalarga East, Armenia, Montenegro, Córdoba-Navarco, Paraíso, Piendamó, Rosas-Julumito, Buesaco-Aranda
- Length: 697.4 km (433.3 mi) (total); 1,787.9 km (1,110.9 mi) (cumulative)
- Width: 20–40 km (12–25 mi)
- Strike: 017.6 ± 16
- Dip: East (general)
- Dip angle: 65
- Displacement: 0.2–1.2 mm (0.0079–0.0472 in)/yr

Tectonics
- Plate: North Andean
- Status: Active
- Earthquakes: 1983 Popayán (M_{w} 5.5); 1999 Armenia (M_{w} 6.2)
- Type: System of strike-slip and thrust faults
- Movement: Variable
- Rock units: Rock units
- Age: Triassic-Quaternary
- Orogeny: Andean
- Volcanic arc/belt: North Volcanic Zone, Andean Volcanic Belt

The Romeral fault system (Spanish: Sistema de Fallas (de) Romeral) is a megaregional system of major parallel and anastomosing faults in the Central Ranges of the Colombian Andes and the Cauca, Amagá, and Sinú-San Jacinto Basins. The system spans across ten departments of Colombia, from northeast to south Bolívar, Sucre, Córdoba, Antioquia, Caldas, Risaralda, Quindío, Valle del Cauca, Cauca and Nariño. The fault zone extends into Ecuador where it is known as the Peltetec fault system. The in detail described part of the Romeral fault system south of Córdoba has a total length of 697.4 kilometres (433.3 mi) with a cumulative length of 1,787.9 kilometres (1,110.9 mi) and runs along an average north to south strike of 017.6 ± 16, cross-cutting the central-western portion of Colombia.

The fault system, active during more than 200 million years from the Triassic to recent, represents the ancient western continental margin of northwestern South America and forms the boundary between obducted oceanic crust to the west of the fault zone and continental crust to the east. The Romeral fault system is situated at the intersection of five tectonic plates; the Caribbean plate in the north, the Panama, Coiba and Malpelo plates, formerly considered part of the Nazca plate to the west and the North Andes plate where the fault system is located. The Romeral fault system forms the structural boundary between the Western and Central Ranges of the Colombian Andes. The tectonic depression produced by the fault zone in the central and southern portion is filled by the valley of the Cauca River, the second-most important fluvial artery of Colombia after the Magdalena River.

The major active volcanoes of Colombia, such as Galeras and Romeral are underlain by the Romeral fault system. Segments of the fault zone are active, producing many minor and occasional devastating earthquakes, such as the 1983 earthquake in Popayán, Cauca and the 1999 Armenia earthquake, with a combined total of more than 2000 casualties. The capitals of Sucre (Sincelejo), Antioquia (Medellín), Caldas (Manizales), Quindío (Armenia), Risaralda (Pereira), Valle del Cauca (Cali), Cauca (Popayán) and Nariño (Pasto) are all situated near or on top of the fault zone.

== Etymology ==
The Romeral fault system is named after the volcano Romeral, located in the centre of the fault zone. The system has received various names as Romeral Lineament (Spanish: Lineamiento Romeral), Romeral Fault, Romeral Fault Zone, Romeral Shear Zone, and many individual segments of the system are known by local names.

== Description ==
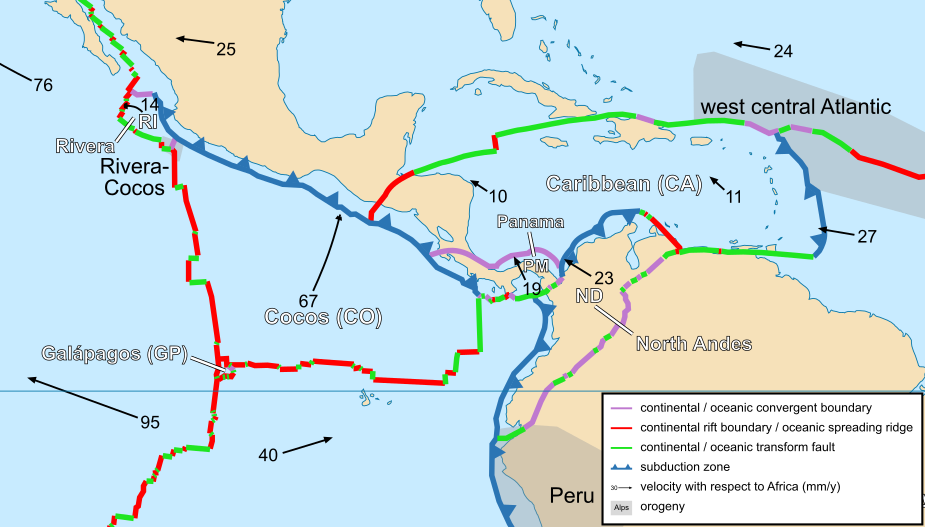
Colombia is located at the intersection of six tectonic plates: CP - Caribbean plate NAP - North Andes plate SAP - South American plate MP - Malpelo plate CMP - Coiba microplate PMP - Panama microplate

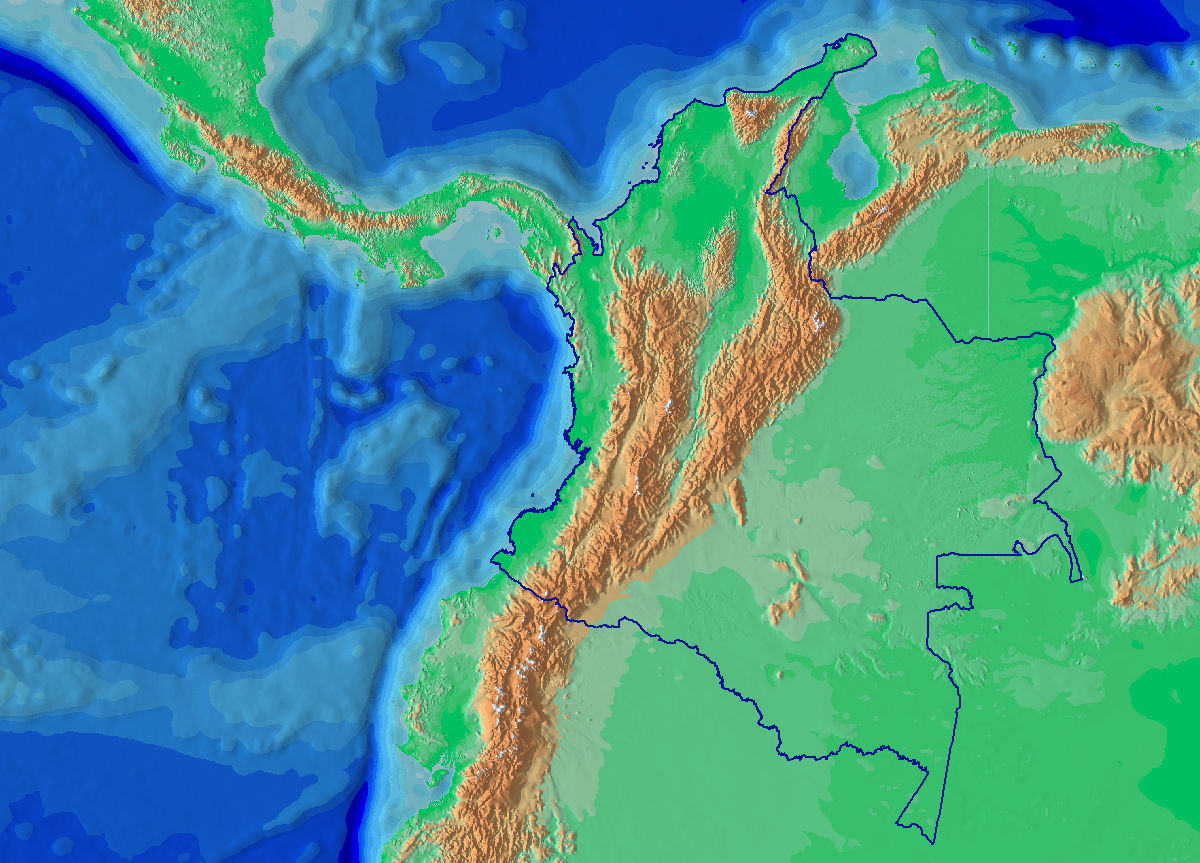
The topography of western Colombia is largely dominated by the Romeral fault system, extending from northern Colombia into Ecuador

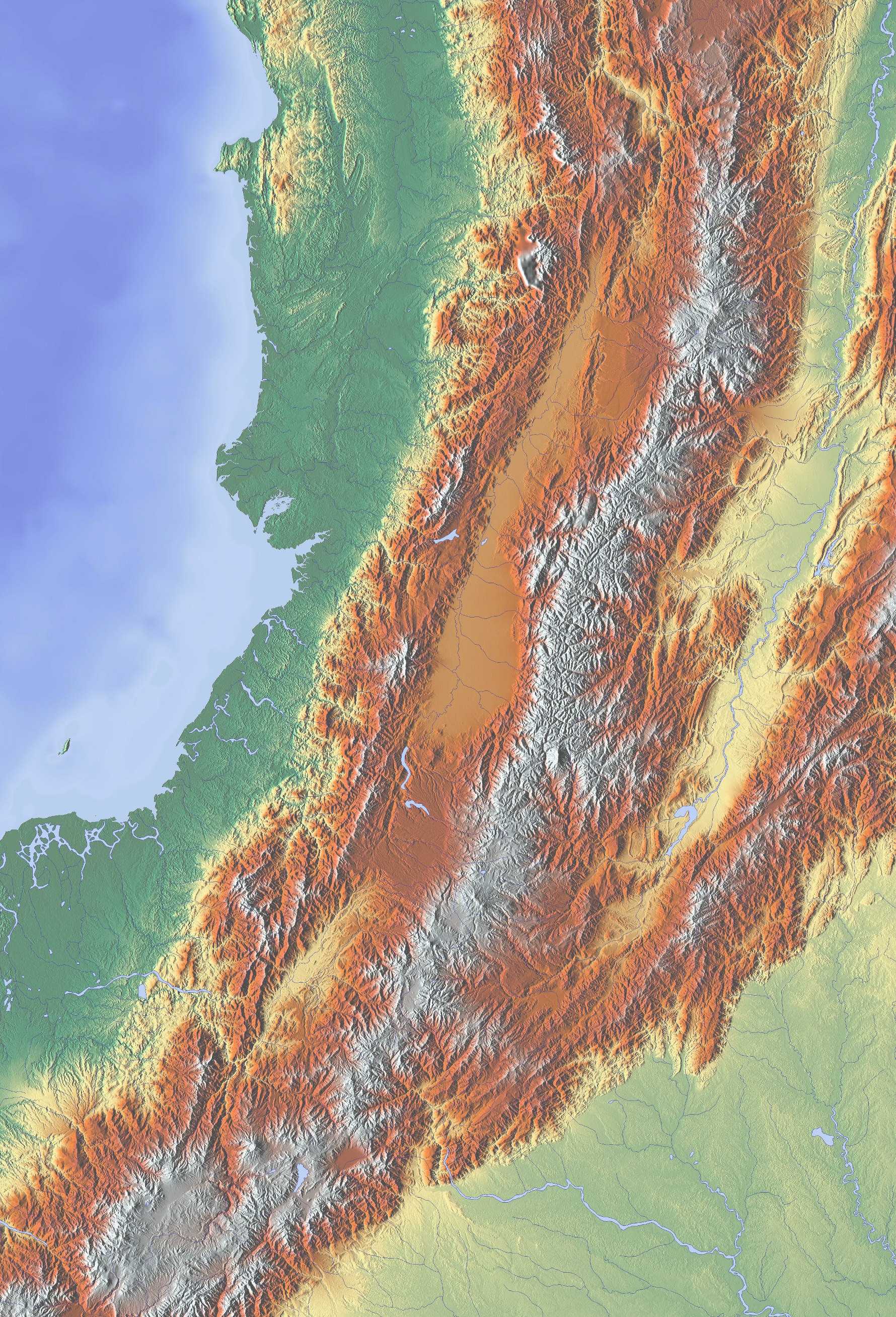
The topographically pronounced Romeral fault system encloses the Cauca Basin in south-central Colombia and forms the boundary between the Western and Central Ranges of the Colombian Andes

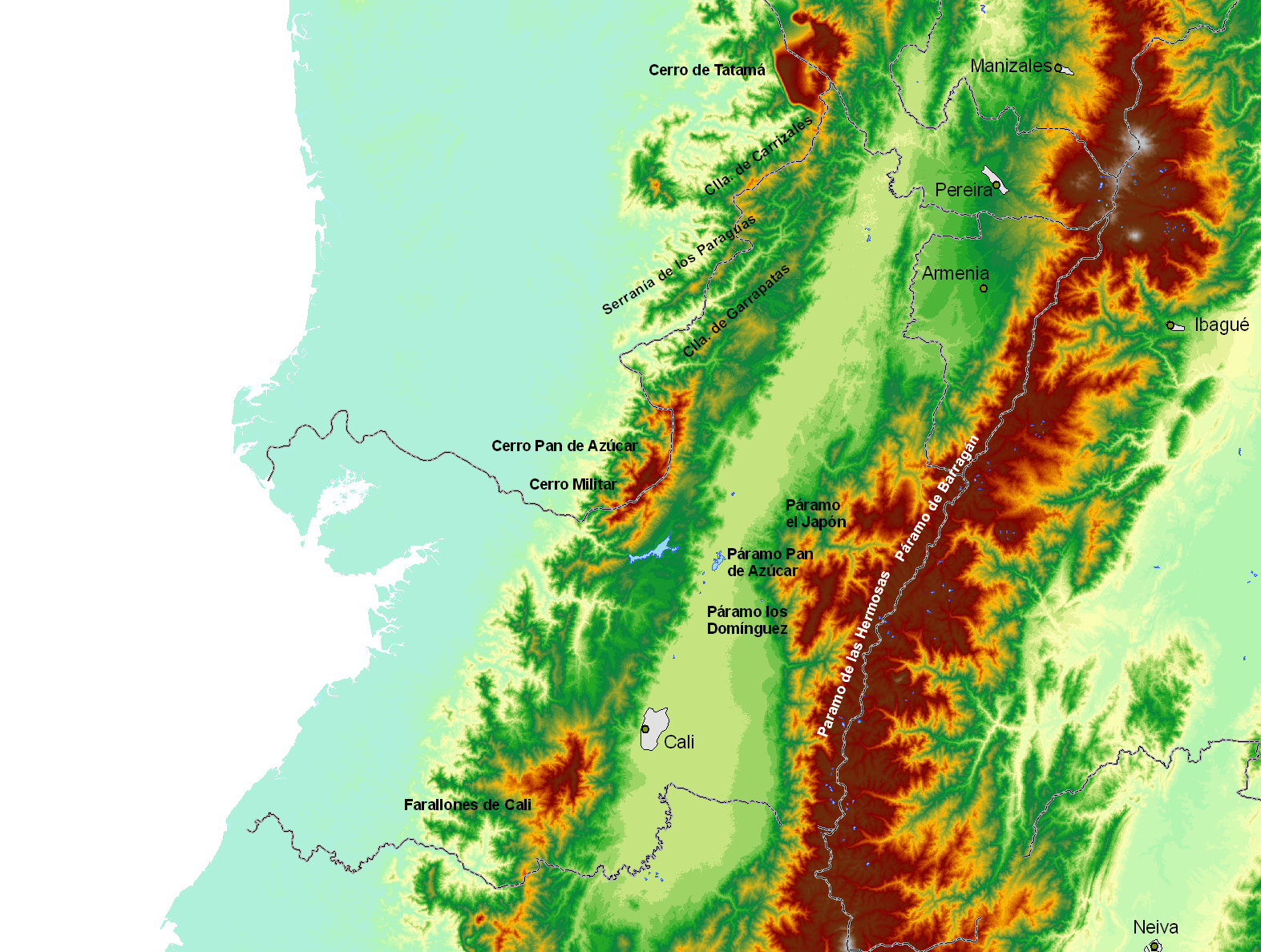
The cities of Cali, situated in the valley of the Cauca River and Armenia, Pereira and Manizales in the adjacent mountainous areas are all affected by the movements of the Romeral fault system with frequent smaller and occasional major earthquakes

The megaregional Romeral fault system represents the geological boundary between the Western and Central Ranges of the Colombian Andes. The fault system was active since the Triassic. During the Cretaceous, this was the western margin of northwestern South America. It is one of the most active and continuous fault systems in Colombia. It extends southward into Ecuador and is known there as the Peltetec Fault System. In the literature, several names have been applied to the fault system as it traverses the length of the country. The oldest name is the Guayaquil-Dolores Megashear, which involves a whole set of parallel fractures in western Colombia. The number of faults that comprise the width of the system ranges between three and five, depending upon location in the country. Near latitude 7° N, the fault system includes the Peque, Heliconia, Sabanalarga, and Cauca Occidental Faults, mainly in the department of Antioquia. Farther south, between about latitudes 1° and 5° N, the faults are known from north to south as the Pijao-Silvia, Quebradagrande, Potrerillos, Guabas-Pradera, Cauca-Almaguer, Rosas-Julumito, Popayán, Paispamba, El Rosal, and Buesaco Faults.

The fault system with described segments totalling almost 700 kilometres (430 mi) in length comprises several parallel regional fractures (faults) that form the transition zone between oceanic rocks to the west and continental rocks to the east. The geology of the western domain consists of an ophiolitic belt with oceanic gabbroic, basaltic and sedimentary rocks of Cretaceous age. The eastern domain consists primarily of continentalised metamorphic schistose, oceanic, and continental rocks, mainly of Paleozoic age. The Romeral fault system forms a 20 to 40 kilometres (12 to 25 mi) wide deformed belt that is parallel to the western slope of the Central Ranges of the Colombian Andes; it extends from the Gulf of Guayaquil in Ecuador in the south through Colombia to the Caribbean Sea in the north. At least one ancient subduction zone is believed to underlay some parts of the zone. Although this is the most studied fault system in Colombia, little is still known about its paleoseismic characteristics (most recent faulting, slip rates, and recurrence intervals). Parallel to the Romeral fault system runs the Cauca-Pujilí Fault that also extends into Ecuador in the south. The two fault zones converge in the northern part of the Cauca Basin.

The fault system is reverse sinistral (left lateral) in the northern part of the country, conspicuous to about latitude 5° N, from there south to Ecuador, it is mainly reverse-dextral (right lateral). The system forms prominent fault lines and well-developed fault scarps as much as 400 metres (1,300 ft) high on Pleistocene-aged sedimentary deposits, and eroded scarps on older Cretaceous to Paleozoic rocks. The system forms an outstanding break in slope above the easternmost parallel set of faults. The upper part of the easternmost major scarps forms the topographic divide of the Central Ranges of Colombia. Regional neotectonic features include linear valleys, offset drainages, aligned creeks, triangular facets, saddles, and L-shaped spurs and linear ridges. The fault offsets Quaternary volcanic rocks, alluvium and colluvium.

=== Segments ===
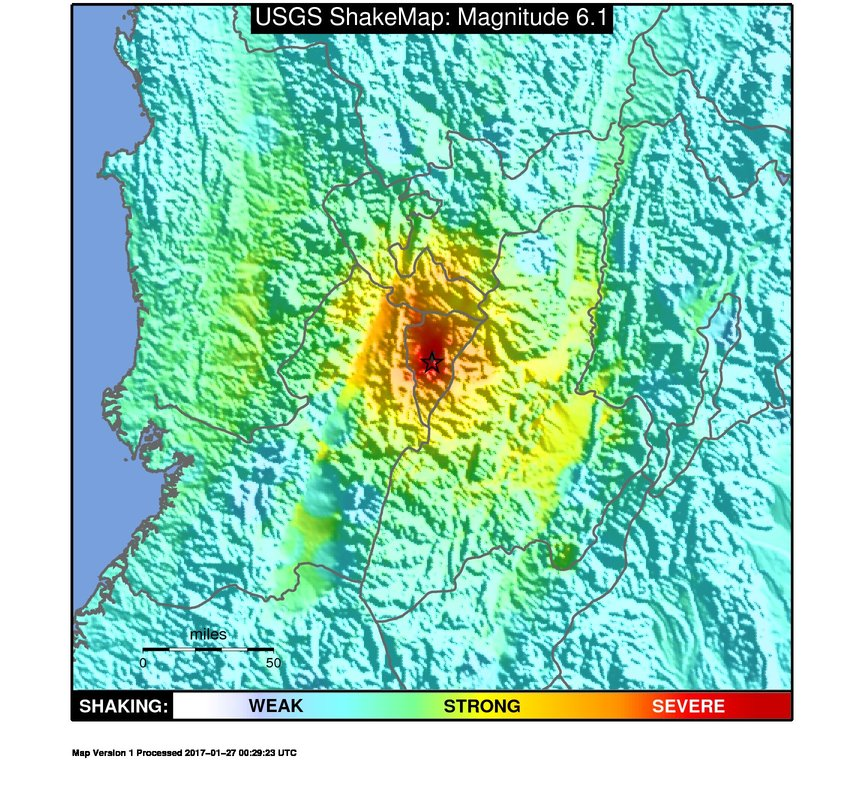
ShakeMap of the 1999 Armenia earthquake, associated with the Córdoba-Navarco segment of the Romeral fault system

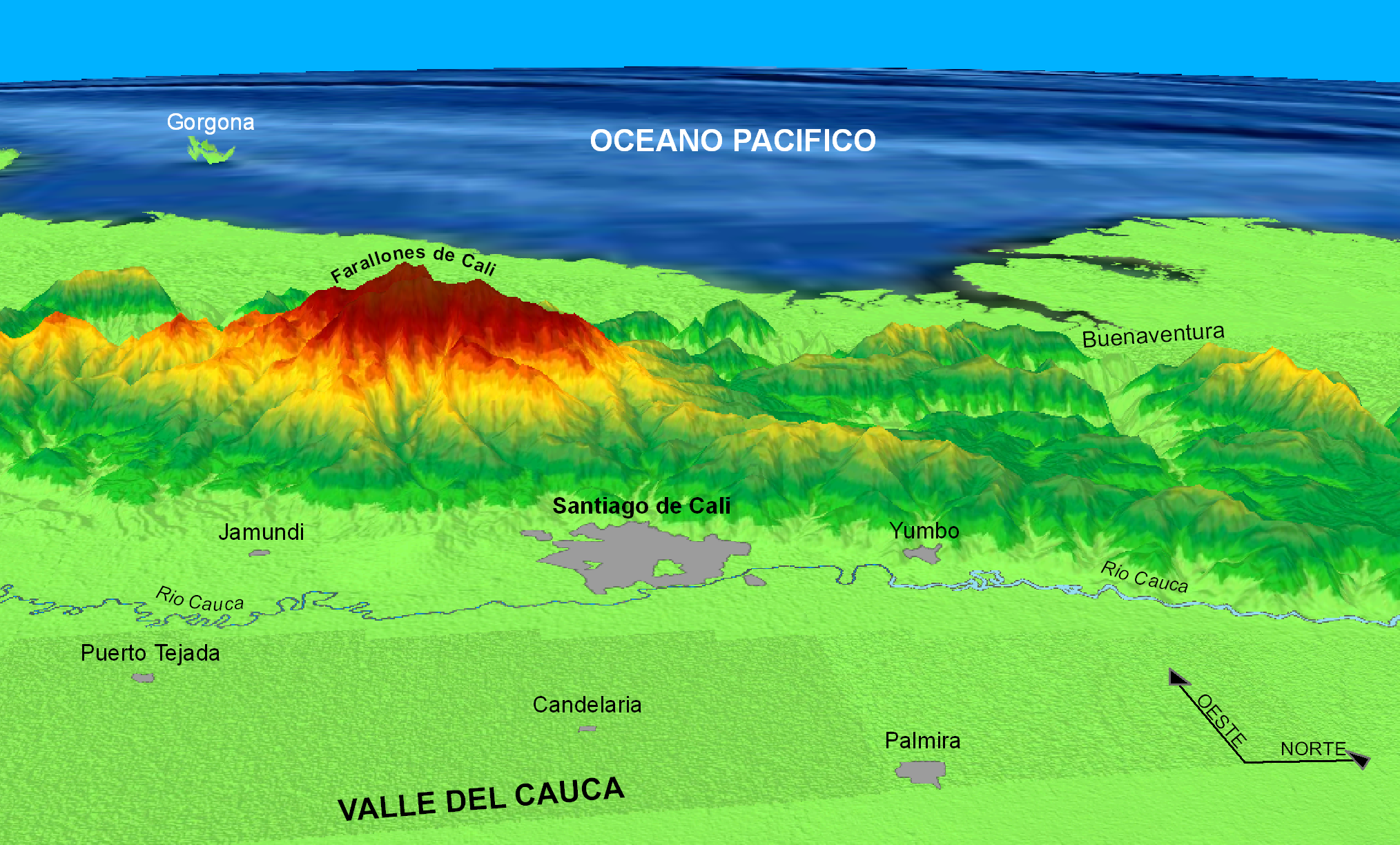
The city of Cali is situated against the Western Ranges and the Cauca Fault segment of the Romeral fault system.

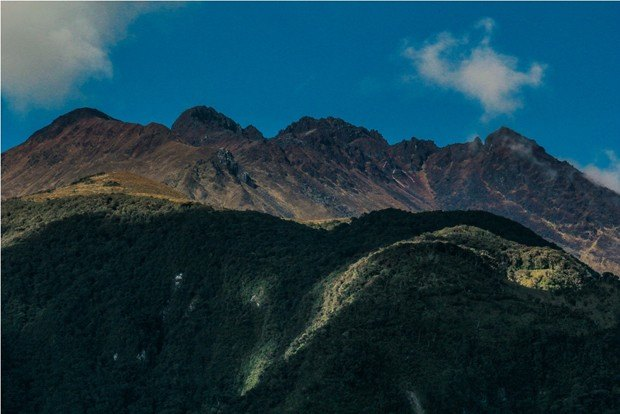
The Sotará is a volcano of the Central Ranges just east of the Silvia-Pijao segment of the Romeral fault system

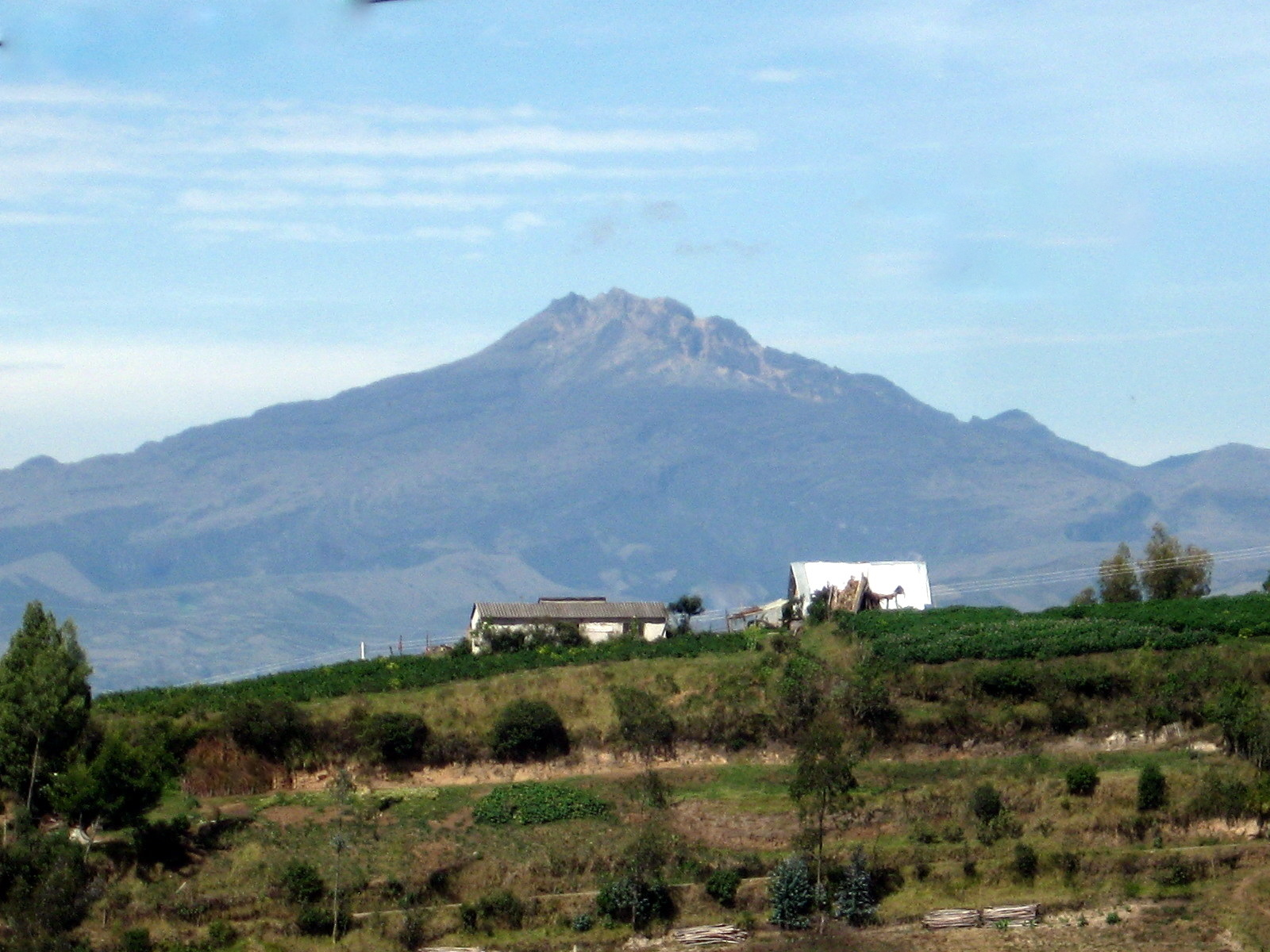
The Silvia-Pijao segment continues into Ecuador just east of the Chiles Volcano

Several segments of the Romeral fault system have been identified under different names in the geological literature. The system starts as the Romeral Lineament in northern Colombia, in the department of Bolívar, where the lineament is covered by young sediments and runs parallel to and southeast from the Guamo Anticlinal, continuing into Sucre, where the lineament runs east of Sincelejo along a north–south strike, into Córdoba through Montelíbano.

==== Cauca-Almaguer Fault ====
The Cauca-Almaguer Fault is a name given to several segments of the Romeral fault system. In the north, the segment bearing this name starts in Puerto Libertador, Córdoba, and extends southward into Antioquia. Between Bolombolo and Santa Fe de Antioquia, the fault covers a zone of 2 to 5 kilometres (1.2 to 3.1 mi) wide with anastomosing fault segments. The fault connects to the Sabanalarga East Fault. The fault delimits the western edge of the Arquía Complex schists. In the department of Risaralda, the system receives the name Cauca-Almaguer Fault again, running east of Pereira. The name appears again in the department of Valle del Cauca, bordering Cali to the west, and in Cauca east of Popayán.

==== Sabanalarga East Fault ====
The Sabanalarga East Fault is the segment of the Romeral fault system in Antioquia between Sabanalarga in the north and Liborina in the south.

==== Romeral Fault ====
The system is known as Romeral Fault when cutting north to south through the department of Caldas, where the fault runs west of Manizales.

==== Montenegro Fault ====
The Montenegro Fault runs through the western slope of the Central Ranges. The fault is located to the west of the city of Armenia. The fault crosscuts and deforms the Pleistocene volcanic and volcano-sedimentary deposits of the Quindío Fan (Abanico del Quindío), which covers about 400 square kilometres (150 sq mi).

==== Armenia Fault ====
The Armenia Fault is part of the Romeral fault system on the western slope of the Central Ranges. The fault runs west of Pereira and the Cauca-Almaguer Fault in the department of Risaralda. Farther south, the fault crosses the city of Armenia and displaces Pliocene to Pleistocene volcanic and volcano-sedimentary deposits of the Quindío Fan. The geometric and neotectonic features of the Montenegro and Armenia Faults are very similar.

==== Córdoba-Navarco Fault ====
This section of the fault system is formed by the locally named Córdoba and Navarco Faults, which are eastern strands of the Romeral fault system, south of the city of Armenia. These faults lie within the epicentre area of the Armenia earthquake of January 25, 1999. The faults extend through sheared cataclastic and undeformed basaltic and sedimentary Cretaceous oceanic rocks, cropping out on the eastern slope of the Central Ranges.

==== Paraíso Fault ====
The Paraíso Fault is located at the western slope of the Central Ranges, east of the city of Palmira. The fault displaces alluvial fans and debris flows on the eastern border of the department of Valle del Cauca. North of the Amaime River, the fault seems to be more active in late Quaternary than the portion south of the river. Two trenches were opened in the northern part: the Venecia and Piedechinche trenches, each of which show Holocene tectonic deformation.

==== Piendamó Fault ====
The Piendamó Fault is located at the base of the mountain front of the western slope of the Central Ranges, north of the city of Popayán, Cauca. The fault displaces pyroclastic deposits and mud flows of the Tertiary to Quaternary Popayán Formation. It forms an outstanding topographic and tectonic block bounded by two intersecting faults.

==== Rosas-Julumito Fault ====
The Rosas-Julimito Fault is a rather short section of about 43 kilometres (27 mi) length, 17 kilometres (11 mi) of which have active tectonic movement. The fault section parallels the Cauca-Almaguer Fault, which is one of the largest older fracture zones in western Colombia. The Rosas-Julumito Fault runs about 5 kilometres (3.1 mi) west of the city of Popayán. The fault crosses the Pliocene-Pleistocene Popayán Formation, which consists of pyroclastic flow, mud flow and ash-fall deposits. It is believed that either the Rosas Fault or the nearby Julumito Fault (less than 2 kilometres (1.2 mi) to the west) produced the earthquake of March 31, 1983 that partially destroyed the city of Popayán. The fault is noted in the south of the Cauca Department.

==== Popayán Fault ====
The Popayán Fault segment of the Romeral fault system is noted near the village of Timbío in the department of Cauca, joining to the south with the Rosas-Julumito Fault. Here, also the Silvia-Pijao Fault segment is present, just west of the Sotará volcano.

==== Buesaco-Aranda Fault ====
The Buesaco-Aranda Faults, which are parallel, extend in a north-northeast to northeast direction from near the Galeras Volcano in southwestern Colombia. The Buesaco Fault is located 5 kilometres (3.1 mi) to the west of the Aranda Fault. On the eastern block of the Buesaco Fault, the basement rock consists of basic volcanic, andesite and dark sedimentary rocks which probably developed in a marginal basin environment during Early Cretaceous time. On the western block of the fault are a group of low-grade metamorphic rocks which consist of greenschist, amphibolite, quartzite and black schist, all of Paleozoic age. The area is mostly covered by a Pliocene blanket of pyroclastic rocks and calc-alkaline lavas, Quaternary lahar deposits and fluvio-glacial deposits.

==== Silvia-Pijao Fault ====
The Silvia-Pijao segment continues southward from Popayán, where it runs parallel to the Cauca-Almaguer and Buesaco Faults. Farther south, this segment of the fault system runs just north of Pasto, the capital of Nariño and this fault trace continues into Ecuador, crossing the border east of the Chiles and Cerro Negro volcanoes.

=== Geology ===
Paleogeography of Colombia
170 Ma
150 Ma
120 Ma
90 Ma
65 Ma
50 Ma
35 Ma
20 Ma
Present

Geometrically, the Romeral shear zone is characterised by an anastomosed arrange of faults yielding a block tectonic configuration, interpreted as an extensive shear zone (kilometric-scale) composed of multiple lithological units of varying ages, diverse origins, poly-deformed, and in faulted contact, which González (1980) named the Romeral Mélange. The system has been traditionally considered as a strike-slip shear zone, however, systematic observation of thrust faults suggests the importance of a compressive component of the system, configuring a dominant transpressive regime at least for the Cenozoic and eventually the Upper Cretaceous. Evidences for post-Coniacian thrusting of Quebradagrande volcanics over a feldspar granitoid, and post-Miocene thrusting of ultramafic rocks over Oligo-Miocene clastic rocks of the Amagá Formation are reported. The fault zone separates the Barroso Formation from the Quebradagrande Complex. Both units are comparable in lithology, the Barroso Formation consisting of basalts, andesites and pyroclastic rocks and the Quebradagrande Complex comprising basalts, andesites, pyroclastic rocks and gabbros. Cooling ages of the volcanics have been estimated at the Early Cretaceous, between 127 and 119 Ma.

Regionally, the Romeral fault system separates the Central from the Western Ranges and corresponds to an extensive shear zone hosting a series of rocks;

1. Early Cretaceous volcano-sedimentary rocks of the Quebradagrande Complex, characterised by mid-ocean ridge basalts (MORB) and arc-related rocks
2. Low-grade possibly Paleozoic meta-sedimentary rocks grouped into the Sinifaná-Meta sediments
3. Mafic and ultramafic Triassic intrusives
4. Permian and/or Cretaceous low-to-medium-grade meta-volcano-sedimentary N-MORB type sequences of the Arquía Complex

These older rock units are unconformably overlain by the Oligocene-Miocene coal-bearing Amagá Formation and the Mio-Pliocene volcanics of the Combia Formation.

=== Tectonic history ===
The western part of present-day Colombia was affected by a series of large-scale tectonic movements from the Mesozoic to Cenozoic. The tectonic history of the Romeral fault system is determined by several phases of plate tectonic movements:

1. Subduction of the Farallones plate during the Jurassic to Cretaceous
2. East- and northeastward movement of the Caribbean plate relative to South America since the Cretaceous to Miocene
3. Break-up of the Farallones plate into the Cocos and Nazca plates in the Late Oligocene (around 25 Ma)
4. Eastward subduction of the Coiba and Malpelo plates, formerly considered the northern portion of the Nazca plate since the Miocene
5. Accretion of allochthonous geologic terranes Western Ranges and Serranía del Baudó in the Late Cretaceous and Miocene to Pliocene respectively

The fault system reached its "actual" configuration when the trans-American plate boundary (the fundamental pre-Aptian east-dipping subduction zone located to the west of the American margin) underwent a major transformation to a southwest dipping subduction zone beneath the future Caribbean Arc, impelling the closure of the Quebradagrande oceanic arc-back arc system. Initiation of this arc is likely constrained by HP-LT metamorphic rocks present in the circum-Caribbean subduction complexes, including examples from Colombia in the Barragán area (Valle del Cauca).

Three Neogene phases of strike-slip faulting along the Romeral fault system have been deduced from the formation of the Irrá Basin, the deformation of its sediments, and rotation of its remagnetised sediments. The corresponding ages and slip-sense of these phases are Late Miocene right-lateral (syndepositional), approximately Pleistocene left-lateral (syndeformational), Pleistocene to recent right-lateral (rotation of the remagnetised Irrá Formation). An additional phase, of left-lateral present-day slip has been deduced from microseismicity activity.

=== Activity ===
Individual fault segments of the Romeral fault system have slip rates ranging from 0.2 to 1.2 millimetres (0.0079 to 0.0472 in) per year. The fault system is active and produced two major earthquakes in Colombia; an M_{w} 5.5 earthquake in 1983 destroying the capital of Cauca, Popayán, and in 1999 (M_{w} 6.2) devastating the capital of Quindío, Armenia.

== See also ==
- List of earthquakes in Colombia
- Bucaramanga-Santa Marta Fault
- Eastern Frontal Fault System
- Malpelo plate
