= List of cities and towns in Colombia =

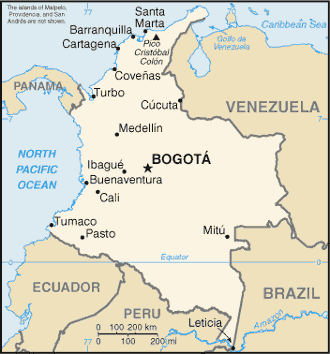
Map of Colombia

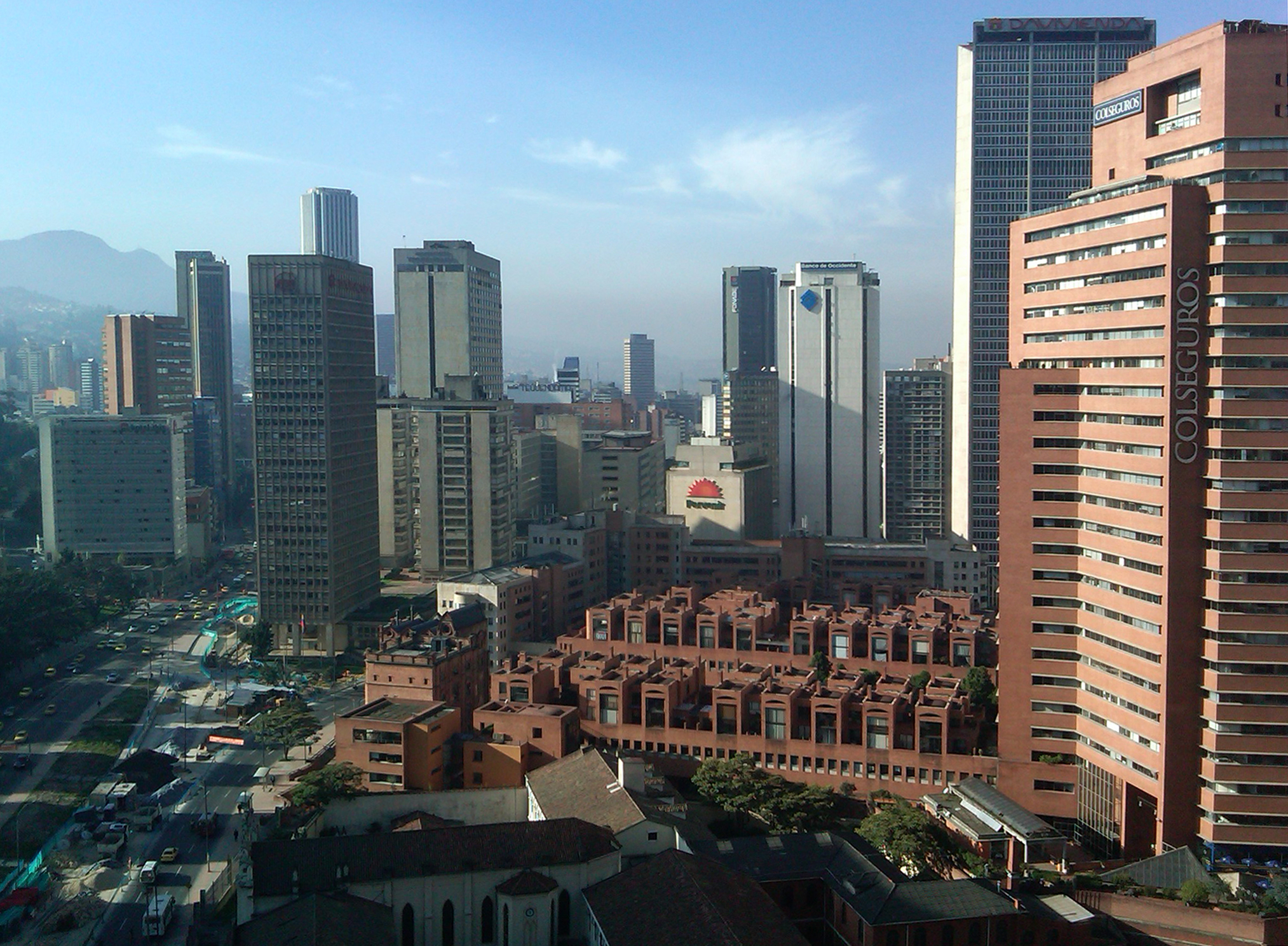
Bogotá, Capital of Colombia

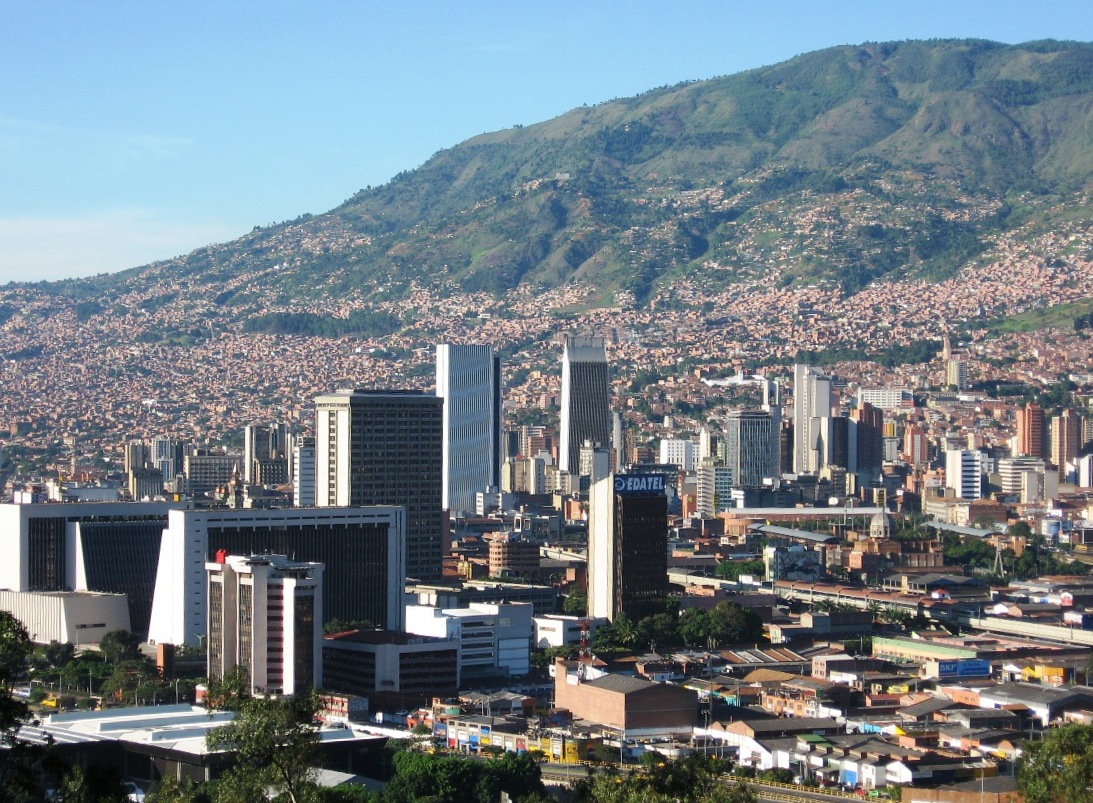
Medellín

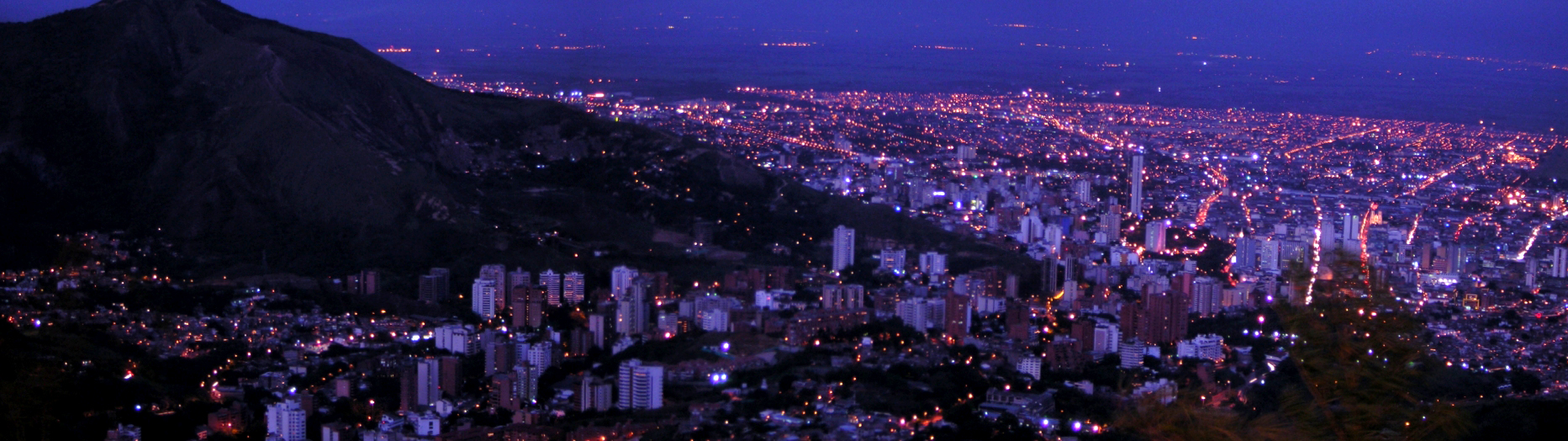
Cali

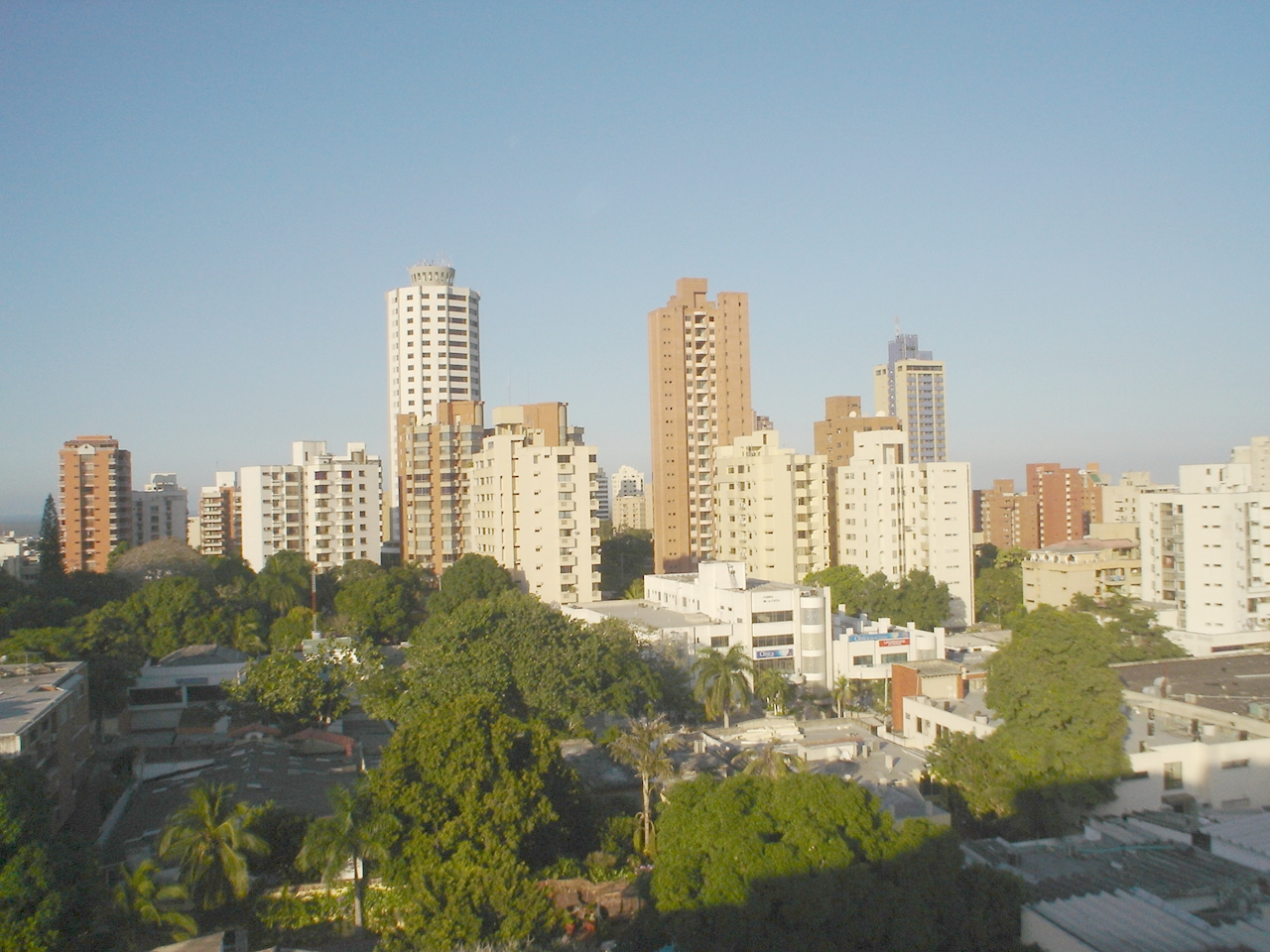
Barranquilla

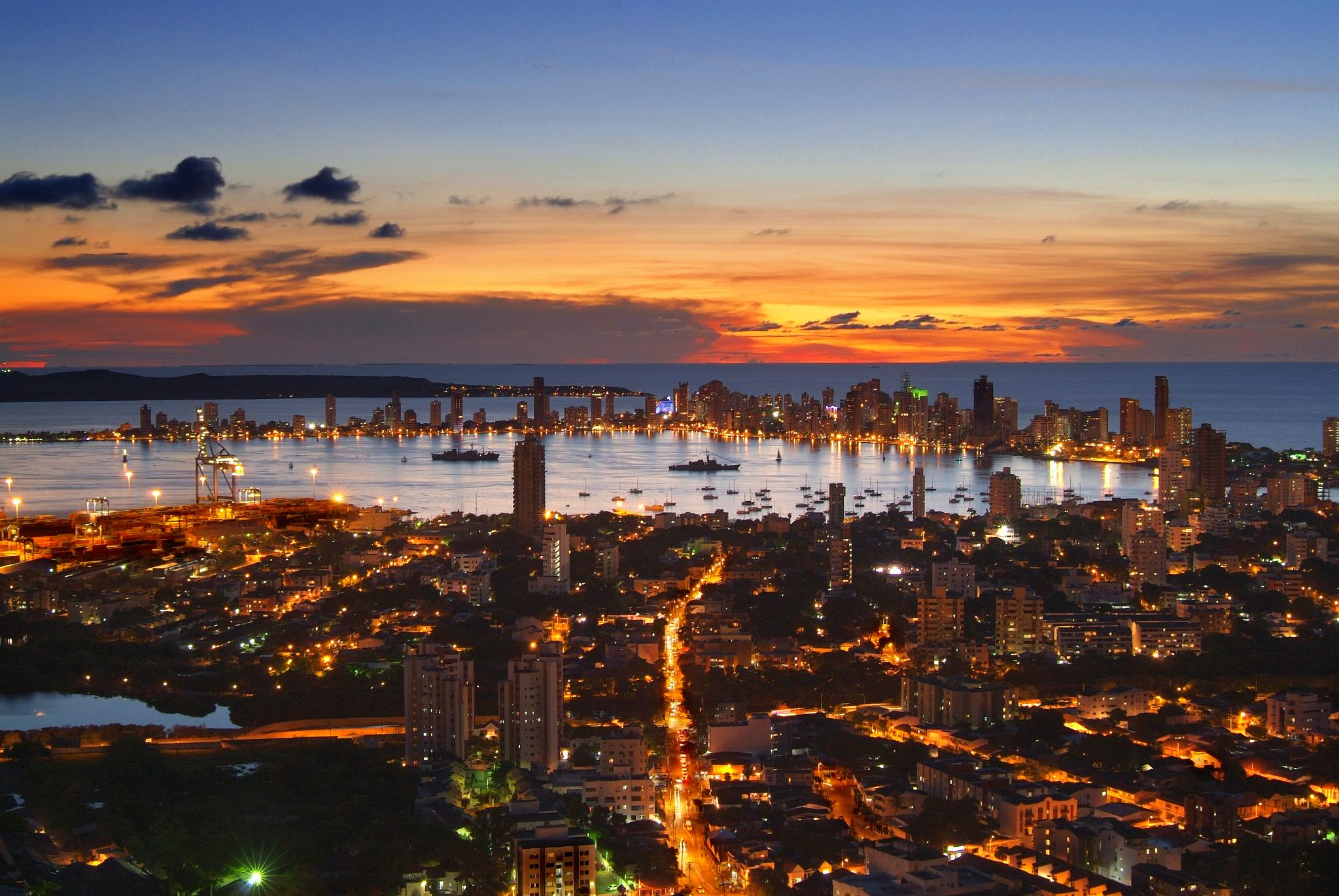
Cartagena

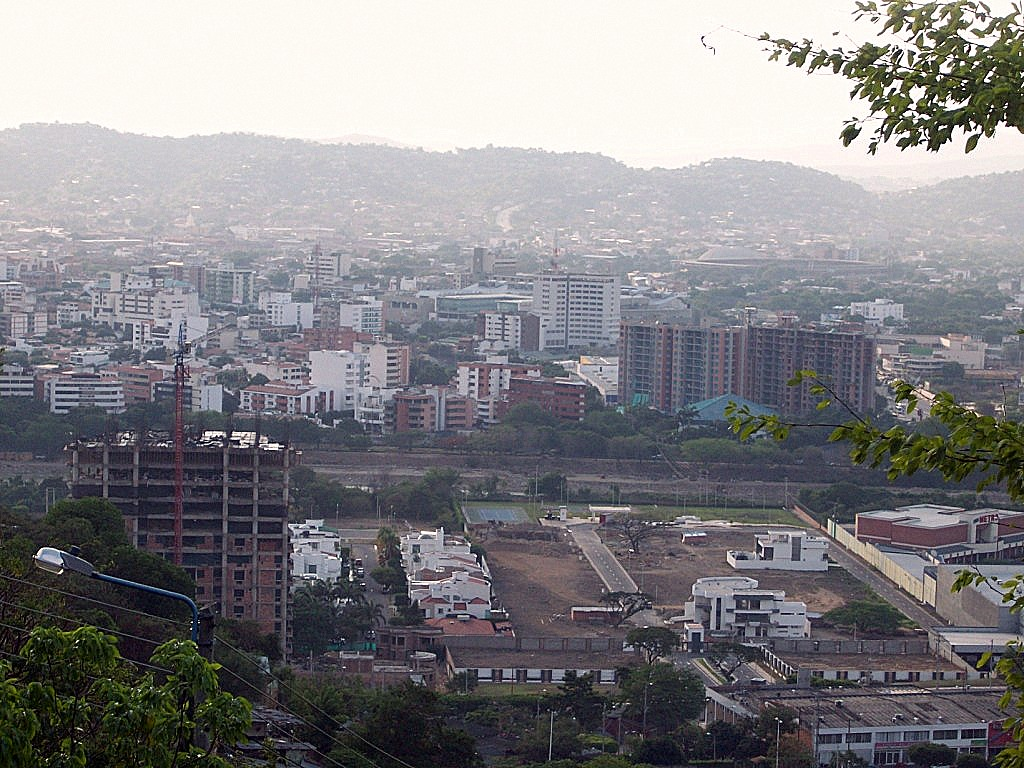
Cúcuta

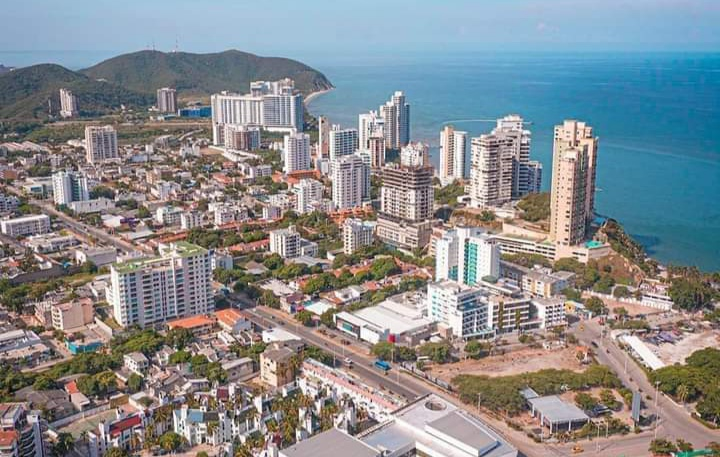
Santa Marta

This article is an alphabetical list of cities and towns in Colombia and their populations, according to the 2005 census. The list is sorted by department first, then by city. Capital cities are displayed first and in bold.

No.	City	Department	Population (2005 census)	Population (2018 estimate)
1	**Bogotá**	Capital District	6,840,116	8,181,047
2	**Leticia**	Amazonas	37,832	42,280
3	El Encanto	Amazonas	4,376	4,972
4	La Chorrera	Amazonas	3,337	4,044
5	La Pedrera	Amazonas	3,711	5,417
6	La Victoria	Amazonas	979	1,140
7	Mirití-Paraná	Amazonas	1,643	1,515
8	Puerto Alegría	Amazonas	1,277	2,196
9	Puerto Arica	Amazonas	1,440	1,320
10	Puerto Nariño	Amazonas	6,983	8,519
11	Puerto Santander	Amazonas	2,373	3,113
12	Tarapacá	Amazonas	3,775	4,314
13	**Medellín**	Antioquia	2,214,494	2,529,403
14	Abejorral	Antioquia	20,249	18,991
15	Abriaquí	Antioquia	2,690	1,971
16	Alejandría	Antioquia	3,816	3,361
17	Amagá	Antioquia	27,155	30,181
18	Amalfi	Antioquia	20,525	22,567
19	Andes	Antioquia	41,591	47,003
20	Angelópolis	Antioquia	7,641	9,353
21	Angostura	Antioquia	12,519	11,040
22	Anorí	Antioquia	15,016	17,737
23	Anza	Antioquia	7,415	7,601
24	Apartadó	Antioquia	131,405	195,068
25	Arboletes	Antioquia	30,738	43,416
26	Argelia	Antioquia	10,091	8,306
27	Armenia	Antioquia	5,196	3,945
28	Barbosa	Antioquia	42,439	52,395
29	Bello	Antioquia	371,591	482,287
30	Belmira	Antioquia	6,188	6,930
31	Betania	Antioquia	10,246	8,976
32	Betulia	Antioquia	16,725	17,726
33	Briceño	Antioquia	8,783	8,673
34	Buriticá	Antioquia	6,955	6,495
35	Cáceres	Antioquia	28,945	41,012
36	Caicedo	Antioquia	7,686	8,396
37	Caldas	Antioquia	67,999	80,528
38	Campamento	Antioquia	9,688	8,915
39	Cañasgordas	Antioquia	16,816	16,737
40	Caracolí	Antioquia	4,855	4,519
41	Caramanta	Antioquia	5,510	5,308
42	Carepa	Antioquia	43,125	60,141
43	Carolina	Antioquia	3,971	3,512
44	Caucasia	Antioquia	87,532	120,479
45	Chigorodó	Antioquia	58,911	82,151
46	Cisneros	Antioquia	9,682	8,869
47	Ciudad Bolívar	Antioquia	28,279	26,698
48	Cocorná	Antioquia	15,119	14,924
49	Concepción	Antioquia	4,509	3,194
50	Concordia	Antioquia	21,420	20,371
51	Copacabana	Antioquia	61,234	72,735
52	Dabeiba	Antioquia	24,084	23,068
53	Don Matías	Antioquia	17,701	23,709
54	Ebéjico	Antioquia	12,511	12,489
55	El Bagre	Antioquia	46,020	50,557
56	El Carmen de Viboral	Antioquia	41,012	48,498
57	El Santuario	Antioquia	26,287	27,273
58	Entrerríos	Antioquia	8,447	10,404
59	Envigado	Antioquia	174,108	238,221
60	Fredonia	Antioquia	22,692	21,142
61	Frontino	Antioquia	20,031	15,703
62	Giraldo	Antioquia	4,188	3,977
63	Girardota	Antioquia	42,566	58,030
64	Gómez Plata	Antioquia	11,252	13,266
65	Granada	Antioquia	9,789	9,881
66	Guadalupe	Antioquia	6,231	6,318
67	Guarne	Antioquia	39,541	50,401
68	Guatapé	Antioquia	5,838	5,097
69	Heliconia	Antioquia	6,656	5,690
70	Hispania	Antioquia	4,821	4,885
71	Itagüí	Antioquia	235,016	276,916
72	Ituango	Antioquia	25,088	19,919
73	Jardín	Antioquia	14,433	13,516
74	Jericó	Antioquia	12,789	11,852
75	La Ceja	Antioquia	46,268	54,615
76	La Estrella	Antioquia	52,563	65,300
77	La Pintada	Antioquia	7,066	6,402
78	La Unión	Antioquia	17,842	19,413
79	Liborina	Antioquia	9,475	9,572
80	Maceo	Antioquia	7,630	6,611
81	Marinilla	Antioquia	45,548	55,798
82	Montebello	Antioquia	7,523	5,825
83	Murindó	Antioquia	3,736	4,891
84	Mutatá	Antioquia	16,428	22,028
85	Nariño	Antioquia	15,579	17,891
86	Nechí	Antioquia	20,668	28,585
87	Necoclí	Antioquia	47,989	67,359
88	Olaya	Antioquia	2,916	3,341
89	Peñol	Antioquia	16,241	15,746
90	Peque	Antioquia	9,621	11,321
91	Pueblorrico	Antioquia	8,294	6,675
92	Puerto Berrío	Antioquia	38,953	49,392
93	Puerto Nare	Antioquia	16,690	19,209
94	Puerto Triunfo	Antioquia	16,248	21,317
95	Remedios	Antioquia	22,769	31,333
96	Retiro	Antioquia	16,976	19,702
97	Rionegro	Antioquia	100,502	126,193
98	Sabanalarga	Antioquia	8,193	8,191
99	Sabaneta	Antioquia	44,480	53,914
100	Salgar	Antioquia	18,206	17,397
101	San Andrés de Cuerquia	Antioquia	7,367	5,917
102	San Carlos	Antioquia	15,826	16,132
103	San Francisco	Antioquia	6,395	5,021
104	San Jerónimo	Antioquia	11,627	12,890
105	San José de la Montaña	Antioquia	3,103	3,436
106	San Juan de Urabá	Antioquia	20,899	26,646
107	San Luis	Antioquia	11,009	10,926
108	San Pedro de los Milagros	Antioquia	22,066	27,978
109	San Pedro de Urabá	Antioquia	28,772	32,063
110	San Rafael	Antioquia	13,530	12,819
111	San Roque	Antioquia	18,157	16,366
112	San Vicente	Antioquia	19,438	16,509
113	Santa Bárbara	Antioquia	23,590	21,591
114	Santa Fe de Antioquia	Antioquia	22,903	25,067
115	Santa Rosa de Osos	Antioquia	31,025	36,991
116	Santo Domingo	Antioquia	11,567	10,049
117	Segovia	Antioquia	35,071	41,711
118	Sonsón	Antioquia	38,779	34,339
119	Sopetrán	Antioquia	13,385	15,057
120	Támesis	Antioquia	16,387	14,224
121	Tarazá	Antioquia	32,943	46,343
122	Tarso	Antioquia	7,155	8,051
123	Titiribí	Antioquia	13,317	14,691
124	Toledo	Antioquia	5,697	6,651
125	Turbo	Antioquia	121,919	172,314
126	Uramita	Antioquia	8,304	8,212
127	Urrao	Antioquia	38,923	46,508
128	Valdivia	Antioquia	17,290	23,931
129	Valparaíso	Antioquia	6,324	6,102
130	Vegachí	Antioquia	11,293	8,949
131	Venecia	Antioquia	13,419	13,184
132	Vigía del Fuerte	Antioquia	5,487	5,610
133	Yalí	Antioquia	7,734	8,577
134	Yarumal	Antioquia	41,240	48,556
135	Yolombó	Antioquia	20,025	25,231
136	Yondó	Antioquia	15,097	19,757
137	Zaragoza	Antioquia	26,959	31,884
138	**Arauca**	Arauca	75,557	92,107
139	Arauquita	Arauca	36,745	42,580
140	Cravo Norte	Arauca	3,661	3,226
141	Fortul	Arauca	21,851	26,454
142	Puerto Rondón	Arauca	3,962	3,825
143	Saravena	Arauca	42,766	48,318
144	Tame	Arauca	47,576	54,198
145	**Barranquilla**	Atlántico	1,146,359	1,232,462
146	Baranoa	Atlántico	51,571	59,551
147	Campo de La Cruz	Atlántico	19,107	15,206
148	Candelaria	Atlántico	12,035	12,554
149	Galapa	Atlántico	32,012	46,314
150	Juan de Acosta	Atlántico	14,578	17,487
151	Luruaco	Atlántico	23,558	27,909
152	Malambo	Atlántico	101,280	127,202
153	Manatí	Atlántico	13,810	16,294
154	Palmar de Varela	Atlántico	23,674	25,762
155	Piojó	Atlántico	5,017	5,169
156	Polonuevo	Atlántico	13,897	15,652
157	Ponedera	Atlántico	18,954	23,243
158	Puerto Colombia	Atlántico	27,837	26,741
159	Repelón	Atlántico	22,873	27,109
160	Sabanagrande	Atlántico	25,399	33,694
161	Sabanalarga	Atlántico	86,631	101,339
162	Santa Lucía	Atlántico	12,418	11,296
163	Santo Tomás	Atlántico	23,874	25,677
164	Soledad	Atlántico	461,851	666,247
165	Suán	Atlántico	9,702	8,470
166	Tubará	Atlántico	10,915	11,017
167	Usiacurí	Atlántico	8,804	9,529
168	**Cartagena**	Bolívar	892,545	1,036,134
169	Achí	Bolívar	19,644	24,259
170	Altos del Rosario	Bolívar	11,357	14,485
171	Arenal del Sur	Bolívar	15,414	20,177
172	Arjona	Bolívar	60,407	76,676
173	Arroyohondo	Bolívar	8,804	10,305
174	Barranco de Loba	Bolívar	15,148	18,757
175	Calamar	Bolívar	20,722	24,246
176	Cantagallo	Bolívar	7,811	9,718
177	Carmen de Bolivar	Bolívar	67,952	77,840
178	Cicuco	Bolívar	11,094	11,138
179	Clemencia	Bolívar	11,714	12,857
180	Córdoba	Bolívar	13,113	12,317
181	El Guamo	Bolívar	7,826	7,769
182	El Peñón	Bolívar	7,807	10,112
183	Hatillo de Loba	Bolívar	11,470	12,200
184	Magangué	Bolívar	121,515	123,955
185	Mahates	Bolívar	22,929	26,802
186	Margarita	Bolívar	9,406	10,151
187	María La Baja	Bolívar	45,395	49,138
188	Montecristo	Bolívar	16,973	22,780
189	Morales	Bolívar	18,523	22,160
190	Pinillos	Bolívar	22,801	25,705
191	Regidor	Bolívar	8,796	11,090
192	Río Viejo	Bolívar	21,060	18,976
193	San Cristóbal	Bolívar	6,561	6,722
194	San Estanislao	Bolívar	15,312	16,573
195	San Fernando	Bolívar	12,965	14,037
196	San Jacinto del Cauca	Bolívar	10,935	14,349
197	San Jacinto	Bolívar	21,593	21,635
198	San Juan Nepomuceno	Bolívar	32,514	33,885
199	San Martín de Loba	Bolívar	14,248	18,483
200	San Pablo	Bolívar	27,010	35,559
201	Santa Catalina	Bolívar	12,058	13,553
202	Santa Cruz de Mompox	Bolívar	41,565	45,104
203	Santa Rosa del Sur	Bolívar	34,015	44,980
204	Santa Rosa	Bolívar	18,195	24,158
205	Simití	Bolívar	18,418	21,250
206	Soplaviento	Bolívar	8,281	8,498
207	Talaigua Nuevo	Bolívar	11,086	11,445
208	Tiquisio	Bolívar	18,786	23,385
209	Turbaco	Bolívar	63,046	75,208
210	Turbaná	Bolívar	13,493	15,353
211	Villanueva	Bolívar	17,576	20,393
212	Zambrano	Bolívar	11,110	11,844
213	**Tunja**	Boyacá	154,096	199,221
214	Almeida	Boyacá	2,294	1,601
215	Aquitania	Boyacá	16,592	14,675
216	Arcabuco	Boyacá	5,198	5,247
217	Belén	Boyacá	9,041	6,966
218	Berbeo	Boyacá	1,913	1,939
219	Betéitiva	Boyacá	2,479	1,933
220	Boavita	Boyacá	8,796	6,608
221	Boyacá	Boyacá	5,074	4,297
222	Briceño	Boyacá	2,748	2,530
223	Buenavista	Boyacá	5,889	5,751
224	Busbanzá	Boyacá	885	1,251
225	Caldas	Boyacá	4,050	3,511
226	Campohermoso	Boyacá	4,065	3,767
227	Cerinza	Boyacá	4,312	3,601
228	Chinavita	Boyacá	3,741	3,437
229	Chiquinquirá	Boyacá	55,786	68,126
230	Chíquiza	Boyacá	6,073	5,313
231	Chiscas	Boyacá	5,372	3,999
232	Chita	Boyacá	10,844	9,171
233	Chitaraque	Boyacá	6,711	5,403
234	Chivatá	Boyacá	5,049	6,579
235	Chivor	Boyacá	2,232	1,668
236	Ciénega	Boyacá	5,242	4,565
237	Cómbita	Boyacá	12,981	15,174
238	Coper	Boyacá	4,201	3,511
239	Corrales	Boyacá	2,544	2,207
240	Covarachía	Boyacá	3,324	2,741
241	Cubará	Boyacá	6,614	6,739
242	Cucaita	Boyacá	4,568	4,691
243	Cuítiva	Boyacá	2,011	1,862
244	Duitama	Boyacá	107,406	113,954
245	El Cocuy	Boyacá	5,582	5,122
246	El Espino	Boyacá	3,997	4,221
247	Firavitoba	Boyacá	6,316	5,774
248	Floresta	Boyacá	4,884	4,383
249	Gachantivá	Boyacá	3,085	2,532
250	Gámeza	Boyacá	5,669	4,622
251	Garagoa	Boyacá	16,520	17,033
252	Guacamayas	Boyacá	2,132	1,574
253	Guateque	Boyacá	10,171	9,411
254	Guayatá	Boyacá	6,368	4,779
255	Güicán	Boyacá	7,869	6,609
256	Iza	Boyacá	2,116	2,412
257	Jenesano	Boyacá	7,436	7,693
258	Jericó	Boyacá	4,716	3,814
259	La Capilla	Boyacá	3,178	2,404
260	La Uvita	Boyacá	3,621	2,259
261	La Victoria	Boyacá	1,674	1,673
262	Labranzagrande	Boyacá	5,345	5,002
263	Macanal	Boyacá	4,705	4,838
264	Maripí	Boyacá	7,914	7,335
265	Miraflores	Boyacá	9,661	9,785
266	Mongua	Boyacá	5,264	4,547
267	Monguí	Boyacá	5,002	4,983
268	Moniquirá	Boyacá	21,852	21,242
269	Motavita	Boyacá	6,772	8,470
270	Muzo	Boyacá	10,237	8,668
271	Nobsa	Boyacá	15,194	16,526
272	Nuevo Colón	Boyacá	6,075	6,680
273	Oicatá	Boyacá	2,822	2,836
274	Otanche	Boyacá	10,463	10,689
275	Pachavita	Boyacá	3,102	2,344
276	Páez	Boyacá	3,369	2,792
277	Paipa	Boyacá	27,766	31,582
278	Pajarito	Boyacá	2,410	1,545
279	Panqueba	Boyacá	1,859	1,393
280	Pauna	Boyacá	10,338	10,820
281	Paya	Boyacá	2,648	2,509
282	Paz de Río	Boyacá	5,258	4,503
283	Pesca	Boyacá	9,762	7,543
284	Pisba	Boyacá	1,533	1,287
285	Puerto Boyacá	Boyacá	50,301	56,517
286	Quípama	Boyacá	8,793	7,579
287	Ramiriquí	Boyacá	10,789	9,763
288	Ráquira	Boyacá	12,522	13,907
289	Rondón	Boyacá	3,011	2,767
290	Saboyá	Boyacá	12,957	12,183
291	Sáchica	Boyacá	3,868	3,758
292	Samacá	Boyacá	17,614	20,546
293	San Eduardo	Boyacá	1,924	1,853
294	San José de Pare	Boyacá	5,719	5,025
295	San Luis de Gaceno	Boyacá	6,383	4,774
296	San Mateo	Boyacá	4,790	3,392
297	San Miguel de Sema	Boyacá	4,612	4,531
298	San Pablo de Borbur	Boyacá	10,924	10,382
299	Santa María	Boyacá	4,635	3,796
300	Santa Rosa de Viterbo	Boyacá	13,249	13,405
301	Santa Sofía	Boyacá	3,121	2,585
302	Santana	Boyacá	7,853	7,628
303	Sativanorte	Boyacá	2,775	2,215
304	Sativasur	Boyacá	1,351	1,038
305	Siachoque	Boyacá	8,894	8,972
306	Soatá	Boyacá	9,313	6,713
307	Socha	Boyacá	7,593	6,973
308	Socotá	Boyacá	10,295	7,549
309	Sogamoso	Boyacá	117,094	111,799
310	Somondoco	Boyacá	4,359	3,411
311	Sora	Boyacá	2,976	3,029
312	Soracá	Boyacá	5,945	5,167
313	Sotaquirá	Boyacá	8,966	7,340
314	Susacón	Boyacá	3,698	2,912
315	Sutamarchán	Boyacá	6,120	5,833
316	Sutatenza	Boyacá	4,566	3,939
317	Tasco	Boyacá	6,925	6,175
318	Tenza	Boyacá	4,651	3,950
319	Tibaná	Boyacá	9,711	9,023
320	Tibasosa	Boyacá	12,626	14,470
321	Tinjacá	Boyacá	2,939	3,044
322	Tipacoque	Boyacá	3,855	3,041
323	Toca	Boyacá	10,561	10,007
324	Togüí	Boyacá	5,229	4,857
325	Tópaga	Boyacá	3,683	3,692
326	Tota	Boyacá	5,676	5,267
327	Tununguá	Boyacá	1,620	1,913
328	Turmequé	Boyacá	7,582	5,787
329	Tuta	Boyacá	8,984	9,856
330	Tutazá	Boyacá	2,254	1,792
331	Úmbita	Boyacá	10,105	10,337
332	Ventaquemada	Boyacá	14,404	15,729
333	Villa de Leyva	Boyacá	12,032	18,050
334	Viracachá	Boyacá	3,477	3,146
335	Zetaquira	Boyacá	5,171	4,374
336	**Manizales**	Caldas	379,972	400,136
337	Aguadas	Caldas	24,308	21,439
338	Anserma	Caldas	35,097	33,397
339	Aranzazu	Caldas	12,815	11,026
340	Belalcázar	Caldas	11,872	10,559
341	Chinchiná	Caldas	53,496	50,880
342	Filadelfia	Caldas	12,737	10,548
343	La Dorada	Caldas	72,925	78,135
344	La Merced	Caldas	6,752	5,172
345	Manzanares	Caldas	25,104	22,781
346	Marmato	Caldas	8,455	9,290
347	Marquetalia	Caldas	14,798	15,010
348	Marulanda	Caldas	3,489	3,382
349	Neira	Caldas	28,140	31,180
350	Norcasia	Caldas	6,903	6,228
351	Pácora	Caldas	15,196	11,130
352	Palestina	Caldas	18,037	17,639
353	Pensilvania	Caldas	26,426	26,344
354	Riosucio	Caldas	54,537	63,822
355	Risaralda	Caldas	10,679	9,254
356	Salamina	Caldas	20,288	15,697
357	Samaná	Caldas	25,649	25,794
358	San José	Caldas	7,572	7,603
359	Supía	Caldas	24,847	27,300
360	Victoria	Caldas	9,165	8,124
361	Villamaría	Caldas	46,322	59,598
362	Viterbo	Caldas	13,159	12,398
363	**Florencia**	Caquetá	143,871	181,493
364	Albania	Caquetá	6,394	6,434
365	Belén de Andaquies	Caquetá	11,081	11,721
366	Cartagena del Chairá	Caquetá	28,678	34,953
367	Curillo	Caquetá	11,121	11,829
368	El Doncello	Caquetá	21,547	22,267
369	El Paujil	Caquetá	17,634	21,148
370	La Montañita	Caquetá	22,181	24,140
371	Milán	Caquetá	11,487	11,829
372	Morelia	Caquetá	3,718	3,892
373	Puerto Rico	Caquetá	32,408	33,623
374	San José del Fragua	Caquetá	13,882	15,223
375	San Vicente del Caguán	Caquetá	56,674	71,704
376	Solano	Caquetá	19,427	25,074
377	Solita	Caquetá	9,134	9,139
378	Valparaíso	Caquetá	11,100	11,772
379	**Yopal**	Casanare	106,822	149,426
380	Aguazul	Casanare	28,327	41,994
381	Chámeza	Casanare	1,820	2,603
382	Hato Corozal	Casanare	10,091	12,794
383	La Salina	Casanare	1,310	1,465
384	Maní	Casanare	11,177	11,123
385	Monterrey	Casanare	12,751	15,399
386	Nunchía	Casanare	8,420	8,928
387	Orocué	Casanare	7,717	8,424
388	Paz de Ariporo	Casanare	27,146	26,357
389	Pore	Casanare	7,968	7,909
390	Recetor	Casanare	2,608	4,528
391	Sabanalarga	Casanare	3,434	2,856
392	Sácama	Casanare	1,706	2,085
393	San Luis de Palenque	Casanare	7,415	7,905
394	Támara	Casanare	7,118	7,029
395	Tauramena	Casanare	16,239	24,066
396	Trinidad	Casanare	11,478	15,840
397	Villanueva	Casanare	21,806	24,518
398	**Popayán**	Cauca	257,512	284,737
399	Almaguer	Cauca	20,463	21,351
400	Argelia	Cauca	24,538	27,454
401	Balboa	Cauca	23,602	26,210
402	Bolívar	Cauca	43,978	44,836
403	Buenos Aires	Cauca	26,961	34,037
404	Cajibio	Cauca	34,706	38,428
405	Caldono	Cauca	30,906	33,910
406	Caloto	Cauca	36,921	17,736
407	Corinto	Cauca	28,310	33,107
408	El Tambo	Cauca	45,804	47,958
409	Florencia	Cauca	6,028	6,175
410	Guapi	Cauca	28,663	29,931
411	Inzá	Cauca	26,989	32,150
412	Jambaló	Cauca	14,625	18,663
413	La Sierra	Cauca	10,937	10,576
414	La Vega	Cauca	38,435	47,007
415	López de Micay	Cauca	19,326	20,721
416	Mercaderes	Cauca	17,702	18,198
417	Miranda	Cauca	33,245	41,925
418	Morales	Cauca	24,391	26,535
419	Padilla	Cauca	8,336	7,744
420	Páez	Cauca	31,800	36,254
421	Patía	Cauca	33,195	37,209
422	Piamonte	Cauca	7,083	7,437
423	Piendamó	Cauca	35,804	45,355
424	Puerto Tejada	Cauca	44,324	46,088
425	Puracé	Cauca	14,970	15,275
426	Rosas	Cauca	12,666	13,542
427	San Sebastián	Cauca	12,820	14,314
428	Santa Rosa	Cauca	9,579	10,780
429	Santander de Quilichao	Cauca	80,282	97,965
430	Silvia	Cauca	30,960	32,588
431	Sotara	Cauca	15,696	17,416
432	Suárez	Cauca	19,244	18,485
433	Sucre	Cauca	8,955	8,880
434	Timbío	Cauca	30,028	35,160
435	Timbiquí	Cauca	20,885	21,969
436	Toribio	Cauca	26,512	30,110
437	Totoró	Cauca	17,430	21,016
438	Villa Rica	Cauca	14,326	16,781
439	**Valledupar**	Cesar	354,449	483,286
440	Aguachica	Cesar	82,335	95,782
441	Agustín Codazzi	Cesar	53,969	49,654
442	Astrea	Cesar	18,394	19,348
443	Becerril	Cesar	13,941	13,261
444	Bosconia	Cesar	30,885	39,100
445	Chimichagua	Cesar	30,993	30,404
446	Chiriguaná	Cesar	22,146	18,852
447	Curumaní	Cesar	27,560	23,360
448	El Copey	Cesar	24,971	26,803
449	El Paso	Cesar	20,808	23,361
450	Gamarra	Cesar	14,472	17,278
451	González	Cesar	9,252	6,398
452	La Gloria	Cesar	14,586	12,405
453	La Jagua de Ibirico	Cesar	22,082	22,372
454	La Paz	Cesar	21,874	22,977
455	Manaure	Cesar	11,317	15,557
456	Pailitas	Cesar	15,902	17,462
457	Pelaya	Cesar	16,561	18,243
458	Pueblo Bello	Cesar	17,228	23,985
459	Río de Oro	Cesar	14,406	13,897
460	San Alberto	Cesar	20,018	26,080
461	San Diego	Cesar	13,772	13,208
462	San Martín	Cesar	17,312	18,846
463	Tamalameque	Cesar	14,046	13,754
464	**Quibdó**	Chocó	112,886	116,178
465	Acandí	Chocó	10,455	9,335
466	Alto Baudó	Chocó	28,961	39,684
467	Atrato	Chocó	7,561	10,751
468	Bagadó	Chocó	8,454	7,937
469	Bahía Solano	Chocó	9,094	9,400
470	Bajo Baudó	Chocó	16,375	17,733
471	Belén de Bajirá	Chocó	13,907	14,279
472	Bojayá	Chocó	9,941	10,113
473	El Carmen de Atrato	Chocó	11,849	14,770
474	El Carmen del Darién	Chocó	5,111	5,548
475	Cértegui	Chocó	9,524	10,196
476	Condoto	Chocó	13,098	15,165
477	El Cantón de San Pablo	Chocó	6,213	8,586
478	Istmina	Chocó	23,639	25,833
479	Juradó	Chocó	3,609	3,239
480	Litoral del San Juan	Chocó	12,244	16,405
481	Lloró	Chocó	10,248	11,461
482	Medio Atrato	Chocó	21,037	32,486
483	Medio Baudó	Chocó	11,715	14,150
484	Medio San Juan	Chocó	13,027	17,456
485	Nóvita	Chocó	7,867	7,958
486	Nuquí	Chocó	7,625	8,866
487	Río Iró	Chocó	8,084	10,218
488	Río Quito	Chocó	7,888	9,292
489	Riosucio	Chocó	14,323	14,707
490	San José del Palmar	Chocó	5,068	4,740
491	Sipí	Chocó	3,481	4,219
492	Tadó	Chocó	18,041	19,112
493	Unguía	Chocó	14,544	15,263
494	Unión Panamericana	Chocó	8,161	10,065
495	**Montería**	Córdoba	378,970	460,082
496	Ayapel	Córdoba	42,542	54,144
497	Buenavista	Córdoba	19,011	22,459
498	Canalete	Córdoba	17,315	23,028
499	Cereté	Córdoba	83,917	93,713
500	Chimá	Córdoba	13,639	15,438
501	Chinú	Córdoba	43,274	49,841
502	Ciénaga de Oro	Córdoba	53,145	67,934
503	Cotorra	Córdoba	15,113	15,547
504	La Apartada	Córdoba	12,702	16,046
505	Los Córdobas	Córdoba	17,837	25,947
506	Momil	Córdoba	14,092	15,175
507	Moñitos	Córdoba	23,597	28,708
508	Montelíbano	Córdoba	73,247	86,858
509	Planeta Rica	Córdoba	61,692	68,810
510	Pueblo Nuevo	Córdoba	31,536	40,911
511	Puerto Escondido	Córdoba	21,786	31,834
512	Puerto Libertador	Córdoba	35,186	52,371
513	Purísima	Córdoba	14,677	15,172
514	Sahagún	Córdoba	87,635	90,406
515	San Andrés de Sotavento	Córdoba	63,147	46,145
516	San Antero	Córdoba	26,123	33,096
517	San Bernardo del Viento	Córdoba	31,405	35,874
518	San Carlos	Córdoba	23,622	28,236
519	San Pelayo	Córdoba	39,260	44,972
520	Santa Cruz de Lorica	Córdoba	110,316	120,558
521	Tierralta	Córdoba	78,770	107,302
522	Valencia	Córdoba	34,373	45,926
523	Agua de Dios	Cundinamarca	11,822	10,733
524	Albán	Cundinamarca	5,952	5,957
525	Anapoima	Cundinamarca	11,503	13,928
526	Anolaima	Cundinamarca	13,310	11,998
527	Apulo	Cundinamarca	7,822	7,812
528	Arbeláez	Cundinamarca	11,806	12,412
529	Beltrán	Cundinamarca	1,947	2,281
530	Bituima	Cundinamarca	2,657	2,480
531	Bojacá	Cundinamarca	8,879	12,448
532	Cabrera	Cundinamarca	4,684	4,434
533	Cachipay	Cundinamarca	9,995	9,765
534	Cajicá	Cundinamarca	45,391	60,379
535	Caparrapí	Cundinamarca	16,483	16,732
536	Cáqueza	Cundinamarca	16,442	17,303
537	Carmen de Carupa	Cundinamarca	8,491	9,366
538	Chaguaní	Cundinamarca	4,101	3,962
539	Chía	Cundinamarca	97,896	135,752
540	Chipaque	Cundinamarca	8,395	8,401
541	Choachí	Cundinamarca	11,165	10,553
542	Chocontá	Cundinamarca	19,512	27,238
543	Cogua	Cundinamarca	18,276	23,654
544	Cota	Cundinamarca	19,909	26,463
545	Cucunubá	Cundinamarca	7,013	7,589
546	El Colegio	Cundinamarca	20,430	22,163
547	El Peñón	Cundinamarca	4,977	4,775
548	El Rosal	Cundinamarca	13,502	18,440
549	Facatativá	Cundinamarca	107,452	139,364
550	Fómeque	Cundinamarca	12,157	12,228
551	Fosca	Cundinamarca	6,654	7,852
552	Funza	Cundinamarca	61,380	79,545
553	Fúquene	Cundinamarca	5,214	5,780
554	Fusagasugá	Cundinamarca	108,938	142,426
555	Gachalá	Cundinamarca	5,916	5,674
556	Gachancipá	Cundinamarca	10,886	15,632
557	Gachetá	Cundinamarca	10,409	11,310
558	Gama	Cundinamarca	3,873	4,045
559	Girardot	Cundinamarca	97,834	106,818
560	Granada	Cundinamarca	6,876	9,253
561	Guachetá	Cundinamarca	11,517	11,348
562	Guaduas	Cundinamarca	31,831	40,446
563	Guasca	Cundinamarca	12,442	15,478
564	Guataquí	Cundinamarca	2,489	2,689
565	Guatavita	Cundinamarca	6,685	6,958
566	Guayabal de Síquima	Cundinamarca	3,652	3,659
567	Guayabetal	Cundinamarca	4,780	4,989
568	Gutiérrez	Cundinamarca	3,489	4,312
569	Jerusalén	Cundinamarca	2,723	2,664
570	Junín	Cundinamarca	8,448	8,701
571	La Calera	Cundinamarca	23,768	28,568
572	La Mesa	Cundinamarca	27,165	32,771
573	La Palma	Cundinamarca	9,918	11,012
574	La Peña	Cundinamarca	6,989	7,046
575	La Vega	Cundinamarca	13,265	14,489
576	Lenguazaque	Cundinamarca	9,769	10,394
577	Machetá	Cundinamarca	6,847	6,178
578	Madrid	Cundinamarca	62,425	82,118
579	Manta	Cundinamarca	4,627	4,769
580	Medina	Cundinamarca	9,845	10,183
581	Mosquera	Cundinamarca	63,226	89,108
582	Nariño	Cundinamarca	2,092	2,249
583	Nemocón	Cundinamarca	11,303	14,137
584	Nilo	Cundinamarca	14,174	19,828
585	Nimaima	Cundinamarca	5,523	7,074
586	Nocaima	Cundinamarca	7,734	8,157
587	Pacho	Cundinamarca	25,414	27,780
588	Paime	Cundinamarca	5,473	4,255
589	Pandi	Cundinamarca	5,468	5,717
590	Paratebueno	Cundinamarca	7,416	7,809
591	Pasca	Cundinamarca	11,122	12,479
592	Puerto Salgar	Cundinamarca	15,519	19,665
593	Pulí	Cundinamarca	2,945	3,031
594	Quebradanegra	Cundinamarca	4,691	4,766
595	Quetame	Cundinamarca	6,570	7,298
596	Quipile	Cundinamarca	8,217	8,146
597	Ricaurte	Cundinamarca	8,145	9,844
598	San Antonio del Tequendama	Cundinamarca	12,374	13,272
599	San Bernardo	Cundinamarca	10,334	10,775
600	San Cayetano	Cundinamarca	5,276	5,354
601	San Francisco	Cundinamarca	8,304	10,011
602	San Juan de Rioseco	Cundinamarca	9,792	9,670
603	Sasaima	Cundinamarca	10,205	10,828
604	Sesquilé	Cundinamarca	9,817	15,415
605	Sibaté	Cundinamarca	31,675	40,535
606	Silvania	Cundinamarca	21,392	22,068
607	Simijaca	Cundinamarca	11,017	13,741
608	Soacha	Cundinamarca	402,007	544,997
609	Sopó	Cundinamarca	21,223	28,518
610	Subachoque	Cundinamarca	13,041	17,077
611	Suesca	Cundinamarca	14,242	18,375
612	Supatá	Cundinamarca	4,952	5,027
613	Susa	Cundinamarca	9,782	13,189
614	Sutatausa	Cundinamarca	4,742	5,809
615	Tabio	Cundinamarca	20,850	29,042
616	Tausa	Cundinamarca	7,715	9,106
617	Tena	Cundinamarca	7,569	9,359
618	Tenjo	Cundinamarca	18,466	20,179
619	Tibacuy	Cundinamarca	4,843	4,832
620	Tibiritá	Cundinamarca	3,018	2,938
621	Tocaima	Cundinamarca	17,196	18,704
622	Tocancipá	Cundinamarca	24,154	34,554
623	Topaipí	Cundinamarca	4,817	4,493
624	Ubalá	Cundinamarca	11,892	10,337
625	Ubaque	Cundinamarca	6,879	5,958
626	Ubaté	Cundinamarca	36,433	39,393
627	Une	Cundinamarca	8,014	9,561
628	Útica	Cundinamarca	4,941	5,039
629	Venecia	Cundinamarca	3,934	4,084
630	Vergara	Cundinamarca	7,730	7,719
631	Vianí	Cundinamarca	4,115	4,226
632	Villagómez	Cundinamarca	2,183	2,168
633	Villapinzón	Cundinamarca	16,573	20,711
634	Villeta	Cundinamarca	24,340	25,497
635	Viotá	Cundinamarca	13,567	13,328
636	Yacopí	Cundinamarca	16,411	17,113
637	Zipacón	Cundinamarca	5,016	5,750
638	Zipaquirá	Cundinamarca	101,551	128,426
639	**Inírida**	Guainía	17,866	20,312
640	Barranco Minas	Guainía	4,384	4,984
641	Cacahual	Guainía	1,592	2,812
642	La Guadalupe	Guainía	225	410
643	Mapiripana	Guainía	3,072	2,759
644	Morichal Nuevo	Guainía	752	1,365
645	Pana Pana	Guainía	2,224	3,467
646	Puerto Colombia	Guainía	3,753	5,031
647	San Felipe	Guainía	1,362	2,306
648	**San José del Guaviare**	Guaviare	53,994	67,767
649	Calamar	Guaviare	11,183	8,456
650	El Retorno	Guaviare	19,063	24,155
651	Miraflores	Guaviare	11,311	15,451
652	**Neiva**	Huila	316,033	347,438
653	Acevedo	Huila	26,384	35,107
654	Agrado	Huila	8,489	9,223
655	Aipe	Huila	19,783	28,418
656	Algeciras	Huila	23,427	24,662
657	Altamira	Huila	3,591	4,538
658	Baraya	Huila	9,179	9,718
659	Campoalegre	Huila	32,186	34,772
660	Colombia	Huila	11,173	12,778
661	El Pital	Huila	12,835	13,951
662	Elías	Huila	3,337	4,130
663	Garzón	Huila	69,823	94,219
664	Gigante	Huila	28,152	34,952
665	Guadalupe	Huila	17,586	22,467
666	Hobo	Huila	6,545	7,019
667	Iquira	Huila	10,627	13,403
668	Isnos	Huila	23,702	28,187
669	La Argentina	Huila	11,592	14,797
670	La Plata	Huila	52,189	66,072
671	Nátaga	Huila	5,831	6,496
672	Oporapa	Huila	10,784	14,475
673	Paicol	Huila	5,208	5,691
674	Palermo	Huila	27,217	34,406
675	Palestina	Huila	10,249	11,950
676	Pitalito	Huila	102,485	133,205
677	Rivera	Huila	16,684	19,378
678	Saladoblanco	Huila	10,235	11,821
679	San Agustín	Huila	29,687	33,814
680	Santa María	Huila	10,218	11,646
681	Suaza	Huila	14,356	20,558
682	Tarqui	Huila	15,914	18,096
683	Tello	Huila	13,553	14,448
684	Teruel	Huila	8,226	8,876
685	Tesalia	Huila	8,874	9,346
686	Timaná	Huila	20,025	20,423
687	Villavieja	Huila	7,374	7,307
688	Yaguará	Huila	7,865	9,294
689	**Riohacha**	La Guajira	167,865	286,973
690	Albania	La Guajira	20,815	28,044
691	Barrancas	La Guajira	26,329	36,862
692	Dibulla	La Guajira	21,798	36,636
693	Distracción	La Guajira	11,962	16,799
694	El Molino	La Guajira	7,315	9,037
695	Fonseca	La Guajira	26,831	34,762
696	Hatonuevo	La Guajira	16,383	27,721
697	La Jagua del Pilar	La Guajira	2,721	3,308
698	Maicao	La Guajira	123,757	164,424
699	Manaure	La Guajira	67,584	116,248
700	San Juan del Cesar	La Guajira	33,654	38,900
701	Uribia	La Guajira	117,674	192,721
702	Urumita	La Guajira	13,349	19,214
703	Villanueva	La Guajira	23,538	28,508
704	**Santa Marta**	Magdalena	415,270	507,455
705	Algarrobo	Magdalena	11,778	12,830
706	Aracataca	Magdalena	35,520	40,879
707	Ariguaní	Magdalena	31,047	32,527
708	Cerro San Antonio	Magdalena	8,319	7,734
709	Chibolo	Magdalena	16,447	15,793
710	Ciénaga	Magdalena	101,985	105,206
711	Concordia	Magdalena	10,244	9,260
712	El Banco	Magdalena	54,855	55,949
713	El Piñón	Magdalena	17,035	16,718
714	El Retén	Magdalena	18,809	21,766
715	Fundación	Magdalena	56,986	57,527
716	Guamal	Magdalena	25,508	28,012
717	Nueva Granada	Magdalena	16,134	21,130
718	Pedraza	Magdalena	8,031	8,095
719	Pijiño del Carmen	Magdalena	14,115	16,411
720	Pivijay	Magdalena	36,018	33,400
721	Plato	Magdalena	49,195	60,824
722	Puebloviejo	Magdalena	24,994	32,346
723	Remolino	Magdalena	8,751	7,980
724	Sabanas de San Ángel	Magdalena	14,895	17,568
725	Salamina	Magdalena	8,404	6,758
726	San Sebastián de Buenavista	Magdalena	17,267	17,568
727	San Zenón	Magdalena	8,904	9,178
728	Santa Ana	Magdalena	23,235	26,923
729	Santa Bárbara de Pinto	Magdalena	11,108	13,103
730	Sitionuevo	Magdalena	26,867	32,801
731	Tenerife	Magdalena	12,550	12,214
732	Zapayán	Magdalena	8,642	8,907
733	Zona Bananera	Magdalena	57,004	61,829
734	**Villavicencio**	Meta	380,222	516,831
735	Acacías	Meta	54,219	73,640
736	Barranca de Upía	Meta	3,197	4,180
737	Cabuyaro	Meta	3,660	4,108
738	Castilla la Nueva	Meta	7,067	10,494
739	Cubarral	Meta	5,152	6,188
740	Cumaral	Meta	16,575	18,395
741	El Calvario	Meta	2,288	2,222
742	El Castillo	Meta	6,875	6,184
743	El Dorado	Meta	3,291	3,451
744	Fuente de oro	Meta	11,072	13,919
745	Granada	Meta	50,172	65,952
746	Guamal	Meta	8,897	9,477
747	La Macarena	Meta	24,164	35,766
748	Lejanías	Meta	9,558	9,303
749	Mapiripán	Meta	13,230	18,532
750	Mesetas	Meta	10,695	11,481
751	Puerto Concordia	Meta	15,964	22,559
752	Puerto Gaitán	Meta	17,306	18,903
753	Puerto Lleras	Meta	10,666	9,491
754	Puerto López	Meta	28,790	34,696
755	Puerto Rico	Meta	17,368	18,870
756	Restrepo	Meta	10,178	10,686
757	San Carlos de Guaroa	Meta	6,602	10,680
758	San Juan de Arama	Meta	9,218	8,728
759	San Juanito	Meta	1,864	2,241
760	San Martín	Meta	21,350	25,605
761	La Uribe	Meta	12,480	17,329
762	Vista Hermosa	Meta	21,048	26,790
763	**San Juan de Pasto**	Nariño	382,618	455,678
764	Albán	Nariño	19,303	22,999
765	Aldana	Nariño	6,850	5,855
766	Ancuya	Nariño	8,991	6,572
767	Arboleda	Nariño	7,443	7,573
768	Barbacoas	Nariño	30,270	40,429
769	Belén	Nariño	6,587	7,801
770	Buesaco	Nariño	22,233	25,947
771	Chachagüí	Nariño	12,792	14,045
772	Colón	Nariño	9,658	10,238
773	Consaca	Nariño	10,287	9,099
774	Contadero	Nariño	6,667	7,035
775	Córdoba	Nariño	13,499	14,091
776	Cuaspud	Nariño	8,101	8,727
777	Cumbal	Nariño	30,996	39,791
778	Cumbitara	Nariño	11,425	16,598
779	El Charco	Nariño	25,733	41,042
780	El Peñol	Nariño	6,851	6,383
781	El Rosario	Nariño	11,368	9,801
782	El Tablón	Nariño	13,991	12,388
783	El Tambo	Nariño	14,146	11,720
784	Francisco Pizarro	Nariño	11,029	16,461
785	Funes	Nariño	6,991	6,354
786	Guachucal	Nariño	16,837	15,269
787	Guaitarilla	Nariño	13,712	11,508
788	Gualmatán	Nariño	5,673	5,782
789	Iles	Nariño	7,836	8,956
790	Imués	Nariño	7,492	5,902
791	Ipiales	Nariño	109,116	148,297
792	La Cruz	Nariño	17,630	18,292
793	La Florida	Nariño	11,423	9,297
794	La Llanada	Nariño	6,544	5,563
795	La Tola	Nariño	8,408	14,230
796	La Unión	Nariño	27,914	25,483
797	Leiva	Nariño	11,785	14,463
798	Linares	Nariño	11,821	9,525
799	Los Andes	Nariño	16,249	20,494
800	Magüí Payán	Nariño	16,394	24,610
801	Mallama	Nariño	9,286	7,332
802	Mosquera	Nariño	11,995	17,783
803	Nariño	Nariño	4,183	5,074
804	Olaya Herrera	Nariño	27,359	32,379
805	Ospina	Nariño	8,221	8,834
806	Policarpa	Nariño	13,785	17,783
807	Potosí	Nariño	13,152	11,830
808	Providencia	Nariño	11,699	13,711
809	Puerres	Nariño	8,979	8,186
810	Pupiales	Nariño	18,404	19,621
811	Ricaurte	Nariño	14,904	19,930
812	Roberto Payán	Nariño	16,892	24,695
813	Samaniego	Nariño	50,437	49,270
814	San Bernardo	Nariño	14,261	20,908
815	San Lorenzo	Nariño	18,398	20,283
816	San Pablo	Nariño	18,103	17,217
817	San Pedro de Cartago	Nariño	7,051	7,657
818	Sandoná	Nariño	25,220	25,746
819	Santa Bárbara	Nariño	15,332	14,559
820	Santacruz	Nariño	20,670	30,900
821	Sapuyes	Nariño	7,473	6,017
822	Taminango	Nariño	17,218	21,629
823	Tangua	Nariño	10,892	9,252
824	Tumaco	Nariño	160,034	212,692
825	Túquerres	Nariño	41,380	40,276
826	Yacuanquer	Nariño	9,965	11,254
827	**Cúcuta**	Norte de Santander	587,676	668,838
828	Abrego	Norte de Santander	34,492	39,090
829	Arboledas	Norte de Santander	9,270	8,946
830	Bochalema	Norte de Santander	6,583	7,103
831	Bucarasica	Norte de Santander	4,561	4,573
832	Cáchira	Norte de Santander	10,619	11,091
833	Cácota	Norte de Santander	2,583	1,763
834	Chinácota	Norte de Santander	14,784	16,848
835	Chitagá	Norte de Santander	10,179	10,427
836	Convención	Norte de Santander	16,605	12,765
837	Cucutilla	Norte de Santander	8,447	7,491
838	Duranía	Norte de Santander	4,289	3,679
839	El Carmen	Norte de Santander	16,377	13,363
840	El Tarra	Norte de Santander	10,772	11,025
841	El Zulia	Norte de Santander	20,309	23,663
842	Gramalote	Norte de Santander	6,329	5,370
843	Hacarí	Norte de Santander	10,121	10,860
844	Herrán	Norte de Santander	4,501	3,924
845	La Esperanza	Norte de Santander	10,953	12,370
846	La Playa de Belén	Norte de Santander	8,395	8,563
847	Labateca	Norte de Santander	5,852	5,898
848	Los Patios	Norte de Santander	67,281	79,336
849	Lourdes	Norte de Santander	3,448	3,351
850	Mutiscua	Norte de Santander	3,907	3,727
851	Ocaña	Norte de Santander	90,517	100,461
852	Pamplona	Norte de Santander	53,147	58,592
853	Pamplonita	Norte de Santander	4,792	4,971
854	Puerto Santander	Norte de Santander	8,720	10,757
855	Ragonvalia	Norte de Santander	6,800	6,907
856	Salazar de las Palmas	Norte de Santander	9,451	8,870
857	San Calixto	Norte de Santander	12,581	13,880
858	San Cayetano	Norte de Santander	4,493	5,753
859	Santiago	Norte de Santander	2,679	2,872
860	Sardinata	Norte de Santander	22,733	22,596
861	Silos	Norte de Santander	5,284	4,198
862	Teorama	Norte de Santander	17,523	22,910
863	Tibú	Norte de Santander	34,773	37,098
864	Toledo	Norte de Santander	17,272	17,287
865	Villa Caro	Norte de Santander	5,044	5,227
866	Villa del Rosario	Norte de Santander	69,833	94,796
867	**Mocoa**	Putumayo	35,755	44,631
868	Colón	Putumayo	5,166	5,651
869	Puerto Leguízamo	Putumayo	16,044	15,380
870	Orito	Putumayo	43,654	56,365
871	Puerto Asís	Putumayo	55,759	62,232
872	Puerto Caicedo	Putumayo	14,206	14,729
873	Puerto Guzmán	Putumayo	22,679	24,169
874	San Francisco	Putumayo	6,808	7,190
875	San Miguel	Putumayo	21,838	28,329
876	Santiago	Putumayo	9,209	10,776
877	Sibundoy	Putumayo	13,270	14,396
878	Valle del Guamuez	Putumayo	44,959	53,649
879	Villagarzón	Putumayo	20,785	21,399
880	**Armenia**	Quindío	280,930	301,224
881	Buenavista	Quindío	3,086	2,758
882	Calarcá	Quindío	73,741	78,779
883	Circasia	Quindío	27,442	30,655
884	Córdoba	Quindío	5,434	5,268
885	Filandia	Quindío	12,921	13,580
886	Génova	Quindío	9,634	7,487
887	La Tebaida	Quindío	33,504	45,242
888	Montenegro	Quindío	39,874	41,722
889	Pijao	Quindío	6,683	6,000
890	Quimbaya	Quindío	34,056	35,195
891	Salento	Quindío	7,247	7,100
892	**Pereira**	Risaralda	443,554	476,636
893	Apía	Risaralda	17,514	19,426
894	Balboa	Risaralda	6,353	6,333
895	Belén de Umbría	Risaralda	27,717	27,728
896	Dosquebradas	Risaralda	179,301	204,739
897	Guática	Risaralda	15,752	15,169
898	La Celia	Risaralda	8,761	8,544
899	La Virginia	Risaralda	31,261	32,265
900	Marsella	Risaralda	21,457	23,917
901	Mistrató	Risaralda	15,166	16,595
902	Pueblo Rico	Risaralda	11,975	13,817
903	Quinchía	Risaralda	33,318	33,941
904	Santa Rosa de Cabal	Risaralda	69,960	72,836
905	Santuario	Risaralda	15,420	15,821
906	**San Andrés**	San Andrés y Providencia	65,627	73,221
907	Providencia	San Andrés y Providencia	4,927	5,192
908	**Bucaramanga**	Santander	516,512	528,610
909	Aguada	Santander	2,117	1,782
910	Albania	Santander	4,473	5,289
911	Aratoca	Santander	8,395	8,280
912	Barbosa	Santander	26,046	29,352
913	Barichara	Santander	7,651	7,062
914	Barrancabermeja	Santander	190,058	191,495
915	Betulia	Santander	5,350	5,031
916	Bolívar	Santander	13,996	11,919
917	Cabrera	Santander	1,924	2,400
918	California	Santander	1,793	2,037
919	Capitanejo	Santander	6,152	5,430
920	Carcasí	Santander	5,200	4,966
921	Cepitá	Santander	2,022	1,819
922	Cerrito	Santander	6,319	5,532
923	Charalá	Santander	11,422	10,290
924	Charta	Santander	3,142	2,549
925	Chima	Santander	3,338	3,014
926	Chipatá	Santander	5,151	5,062
927	Cimitarra	Santander	34,293	48,328
928	Concepción	Santander	5,908	5,110
929	Confines	Santander	2,753	2,695
930	Contratación	Santander	4,021	3,352
931	Coromoro	Santander	7,376	7,642
932	Curití	Santander	11,464	12,016
933	El Carmen de Chucurí	Santander	18,098	20,671
934	El Guacamayo	Santander	2,303	1,918
935	El Peñón	Santander	5,600	5,038
936	El Playón	Santander	13,148	11,385
937	Encino	Santander	2,711	2,440
938	Enciso	Santander	3,989	3,136
939	Florián	Santander	6,378	6,276
940	Floridablanca	Santander	254,683	267,124
941	Galán	Santander	2,992	2,139
942	Gámbita	Santander	5,168	5,039
943	Guaca	Santander	6,916	6,264
944	Guadalupe	Santander	5,596	4,519
945	Guapotá	Santander	2,271	2,096
946	Guavatá	Santander	4,402	3,495
947	Güepsa	Santander	4,285	3,730
948	Hato	Santander	2,401	2,324
949	Jesús María	Santander	3,455	3,045
950	Jordán	Santander	1,164	1,089
951	La Belleza	Santander	8,462	8,596
952	La Paz	Santander	5,611	5,027
953	Landázuri	Santander	15,192	15,430
954	Lebrija	Santander	30,980	41,122
955	Los Santos	Santander	10,977	12,539
956	Macaravita	Santander	2,753	2,263
957	Málaga	Santander	18,706	18,271
958	Matanza	Santander	5,840	5,147
959	Mogotes	Santander	10,952	10,864
960	Molagavita	Santander	5,764	5,029
961	Ocamonte	Santander	4,984	4,702
962	Oiba	Santander	10,983	11,980
963	Onzaga	Santander	5,707	4,895
964	Palmar	Santander	2,883	3,474
965	Palmas del Socorro	Santander	2,443	2,196
966	Páramo	Santander	3,671	4,252
967	Piedecuesta	Santander	117,364	159,760
968	Pinchote	Santander	4,420	5,460
969	Puente Nacional	Santander	14,538	11,900
970	Puerto Parra	Santander	6,514	7,891
971	Puerto Wilches	Santander	31,503	31,505
972	Rionegro	Santander	29,382	26,461
973	Sabana de Torres	Santander	19,772	18,149
974	San Andrés	Santander	9,783	8,208
975	San Benito	Santander	3,907	4,007
976	San Gil	Santander	43,519	45,891
977	San Joaquín	Santander	2,948	2,371
978	San José de Miranda	Santander	4,855	4,214
979	San Juan de Girón	Santander	135,791	195,499
980	San Miguel	Santander	2,683	2,295
981	San Vicente de Chucurí	Santander	33,267	35,000
982	Santa Bárbara	Santander	2,311	2,085
983	Santa Helena del Opón	Santander	4,473	4,266
984	Simacota	Santander	8,910	7,493
985	Socorro	Santander	29,076	30,985
986	Suaita	Santander	10,975	10,072
987	Sucre	Santander	9,256	8,172
988	Suratá	Santander	3,662	3,196
989	Tona	Santander	6,690	7,201
990	Valle de San José	Santander	5,315	4,495
991	Vélez	Santander	19,755	18,871
992	Vetas	Santander	2,349	2,464
993	Villanueva	Santander	6,978	5,548
994	Zapatoca	Santander	9,449	8,803
995	**Sincelejo**	Sucre	237,618	286,749
996	Buenavista	Sucre	8,962	9,746
997	Caimito	Sucre	11,048	12,419
998	Chalán	Sucre	4,188	4,401
999	Colosó	Sucre	6,214	5,731
1000	Corozal	Sucre	57,756	63,657
1001	Coveñas	Sucre	11,331	14,288
1002	El Roble	Sucre	9,433	10,917
1003	Galeras	Sucre	17,297	21,199
1004	Guaranda	Sucre	15,498	18,124
1005	La Unión	Sucre	10,346	11,454
1006	Los Palmitos	Sucre	19,315	19,224
1007	Majagual	Sucre	31,657	33,811
1008	Morroa	Sucre	12,846	14,937
1009	Ovejas	Sucre	21,658	20,906
1010	Palmito	Sucre	11,361	14,499
1011	Sampués	Sucre	36,481	38,339
1012	San Benito Abad	Sucre	22,972	26,298
1013	San Juan Betulia	Sucre	12,378	12,583
1014	San Marcos	Sucre	50,679	59,237
1015	San Onofre	Sucre	46,383	51,536
1016	San Pedro	Sucre	16,415	15,925
1017	San Luis de Sincé	Sucre	30,648	34,681
1018	Sucre	Sucre	22,463	22,450
1019	Toluviejo	Sucre	18,955	18,892
1020	Tolú	Sucre	28,108	35,054
1021	**Ibagué**	Tolima	498,401	569,336
1022	Alpujarra	Tolima	5,174	4,948
1023	Alvarado	Tolima	8,972	8,777
1024	Ambalema	Tolima	7,674	6,594
1025	Anzoátegui	Tolima	16,422	19,059
1026	Armero	Tolima	13,064	11,609
1027	Ataco	Tolima	21,942	22,752
1028	Cajamarca	Tolima	19,789	19,611
1029	Carmen de Apicalá	Tolima	8,394	8,916
1030	Casabianca	Tolima	6,909	6,603
1031	Chaparral	Tolima	46,712	47,344
1032	Coello	Tolima	9,017	9,963
1033	Coyaima	Tolima	28,056	28,412
1034	Cunday	Tolima	10,689	9,459
1035	Dolores	Tolima	9,164	7,826
1036	Espinal	Tolima	76,226	75,949
1037	Falan	Tolima	9,277	9,196
1038	Flandes	Tolima	27,943	29,377
1039	Fresno	Tolima	31,317	29,917
1040	Guamo	Tolima	34,781	31,605
1041	Herveo	Tolima	9,142	7,795
1042	Honda	Tolima	27,310	24,077
1043	Icononzo	Tolima	11,649	10,705
1044	Lérida	Tolima	19,489	17,013
1045	Líbano	Tolima	42,269	39,866
1046	Mariquita	Tolima	32,933	33,358
1047	Melgar	Tolima	32,774	36,930
1048	Murillo	Tolima	5,075	5,001
1049	Natagaima	Tolima	23,212	22,390
1050	Ortega	Tolima	33,873	32,256
1051	Palocabildo	Tolima	9,609	9,090
1052	Piedras	Tolima	5,427	5,683
1053	Planadas	Tolima	29,417	30,066
1054	Prado	Tolima	8,761	7,513
1055	Purificación	Tolima	27,873	29,665
1056	Rioblanco	Tolima	25,636	24,244
1057	Roncesvalles	Tolima	6,269	6,352
1058	Rovira	Tolima	21,665	20,349
1059	Saldaña	Tolima	14,990	14,255
1060	San Antonio	Tolima	15,331	14,138
1061	San Luis	Tolima	19,262	19,130
1062	Santa Isabel	Tolima	6,565	6,319
1063	Suárez	Tolima	4,519	4,547
1064	Valle de San Juan	Tolima	6,178	6,405
1065	Venadillo	Tolima	18,769	19,764
1066	Villahermosa	Tolima	11,196	10,531
1067	Villarrica	Tolima	6,226	5,252
1068	**Cali**	Valle del Cauca	2,119,908	2,445,405
1069	Alcalá	Valle del Cauca	17,568	22,710
1070	Andalucía	Valle del Cauca	18,136	17,738
1071	Ansermanuevo	Valle del Cauca	20,692	19,252
1072	Argelia	Valle del Cauca	6,693	6,364
1073	Bolívar	Valle del Cauca	15,360	12,961
1074	Buenaventura	Valle del Cauca	328,794	424,047
1075	Bugalagrande	Valle del Cauca	21,601	21,017
1076	Caicedonia	Valle del Cauca	30,947	29,526
1077	Calima	Valle del Cauca	15,497	15,848
1078	Candelaria	Valle del Cauca	70,296	85,352
1079	Cartago	Valle del Cauca	124,831	134,308
1080	Dagua	Valle del Cauca	35,270	36,775
1081	El Águila	Valle del Cauca	10,689	11,209
1082	El Cairo	Valle del Cauca	9,356	10,184
1083	El Cerrito	Valle del Cauca	54,598	58,296
1084	El Dovio	Valle del Cauca	9,548	8,236
1085	Florida	Valle del Cauca	56,008	58,775
1086	Ginebra	Valle del Cauca	19,268	21,624
1087	Guacarí	Valle del Cauca	31,802	35,377
1088	Guadalajara de Buga	Valle del Cauca	116,893	114,562
1089	Jamundí	Valle del Cauca	96,993	127,228
1090	La Cumbre	Valle del Cauca	11,122	11,672
1091	La Unión	Valle del Cauca	31,798	39,671
1092	La Victoria	Valle del Cauca	14,134	12,994
1093	Obando	Valle del Cauca	14,380	15,229
1094	Palmira	Valle del Cauca	284,470	310,594
1095	Pradera	Valle del Cauca	48,843	57,257
1096	Restrepo	Valle del Cauca	15,805	16,365
1097	Riofrío	Valle del Cauca	17,376	14,029
1098	Roldanillo	Valle del Cauca	34,698	32,226
1099	San Pedro	Valle del Cauca	15,784	18,882
1100	Sevilla	Valle del Cauca	47,872	44,311
1101	Toro	Valle del Cauca	15,913	16,598
1102	Trujillo	Valle del Cauca	18,667	17,919
1103	Tuluá	Valle del Cauca	187,275	219,148
1104	Ulloa	Valle del Cauca	5,745	5,336
1105	Versalles	Valle del Cauca	8,270	6,926
1106	Vijes	Valle del Cauca	9,787	11,409
1107	Yotoco	Valle del Cauca	15,563	16,491
1108	Yumbo	Valle del Cauca	92,192	125,663
1109	Zarzal	Valle del Cauca	40,983	46,599
1110	**Mitú**	Vaupés	28,382	32,457
1111	Carurú	Vaupés	3,242	3,340
1112	Pacoa	Vaupés	4,459	6,121
1113	Papunahua	Vaupés	879	832
1114	Taraira	Vaupés	1,048	952
1115	Yavaraté	Vaupés	1,269	1,226
1116	**Puerto Carreño**	Vichada	13,288	16,504
1117	Cumaribo	Vichada	28,718	39,549
1118	La Primavera	Vichada	10,616	17,026
1119	Santa Rosalía	Vichada	3,250	4,197

== See also ==
- List of cities
- List of cities in Colombia by population, a list that only includes cities with no less than 100,000 residents in order of population size (instead of alphabetical order).
- Departments of Colombia
- Municipalities of Colombia
