= San Lorenzo Municipality =

San Lorenzo Municipality may refer to:

- San Lorenzo Municipality, Pando in Madre de Dios Province, Bolivia
- San Lorenzo Municipality, Tarija in Eustaquio Méndez Province, Bolivia
- San Lorenzo, Nariño, Colombia
- San Lorenzo, Ahuachapán, El Salvador
- San Lorenzo, Suchitepéquez, Guatemala
- San Lorenzo, Valle, Honduras
- San Lorenzo, Oaxaca, Mexico
- San Lorenzo, Boaco, Nicaragua
- San Lorenzo, Guimaras, Philippines
- San Lorenzo, Puerto Rico
