= List of shipwrecks in June 1851 =

The list of shipwrecks in June 1851 includes ships sunk, foundered, wrecked, grounded, or otherwise lost during June 1851.

== 1 June ==
List of shipwrecks: 1 June 1851
Ship	State	Description
Neptune	United Kingdom	The steamship ran aground and was damaged on the Swinebottoms, in the Baltic Sea. All on board were rescued. She was on a voyage from London to Saint Petersburg, Russia. Neptune was refloated on 7 June and was towed in to Copenhagen, Denmark, where she arrived the next day.

== 3 June ==
List of shipwrecks: 3 June 1851
Ship	State	Description
Alcmène	French Navy	The Ariane-class corvette was wrecked between Hokianga and Kaipara, New Zealand, with the loss of 12 lives.
Broderliefde	Netherlands	The ship was driven ashore north of "Koog", North Holland. She was on a voyage from Hartlepool, County Durham, United Kingdom to Medemblik, North Holland.
Friends	United Kingdom	The smack was driven ashore and wrecked at Strumble Head, Pembrokeshire. Her crew were rescued.
Garland Grove	United Kingdom	The ship was abandoned in the South Atlantic. Her crew were rescued by Magdelina (Netherlands). Garland Grove was on a voyage from London to Adelaide, South Australia.
Mary	United Kingdom	The ship ran aground and was damaged at Whitby, Yorkshire. She was on a voyage from London to Newcastle upon Tyne, Northumberland.
St. Vincent de Paul	Belgium	The fishing boat was driven ashore and wrecked at Kingsbarns, Fife, United Kingdom. Her crew were rescued.
William Wilson	United Kingdom	The ship foundered off Trinidad. She was on a voyage from South Shields, County Durham to Aden.

== 4 June ==
List of shipwrecks: 4 June 1851
Ship	State	Description
Emmaus	United Kingdom	The sloop was driven ashore and severely damaged at Coatham, Northumberland.
Mary Ann	United Kingdom	The ship sprang a leak and was beached 2 nautical miles (3.7 km) north of Whitby Yorkshire with the loss of two of her crew.

== 5 June ==
List of shipwrecks: 5 June 1851
Ship	State	Description
Palestine	United States	The barque was driven ashore and wrecked at Valparaíso, Chile.

== 6 June ==
List of shipwrecks: 6 June 1851
Ship	State	Description
Meteor	(United Kingdom of Great Britain and Ireland) Sierra Leone	The ship foundered in the Atlantic Ocean 25 nautical miles (46 km) west of Axim, Gold Coast. Her crew were rescued. She was on a voyage from Liverpool, Lancashire to the west coast of Africa.
Repealer	(United Kingdom of Great Britain and Ireland) Isle of Man	The ship was driven ashore near Rota, Spain. She was on a voyage from Cádiz, Spain to Douglas and Liverpool. She was refloated and put back to Cádiz.

== 8 June ==
List of shipwrecks: 8 June 1851
Ship	State	Description
Bodisar	Trieste	The barque was driven ashore and wrecked at Fort Lage, Brazil. She was on a voyage from Trieste to Rio de Janeiro, Brazil.
Charlotte	United Kingdom	The ship struck the Middle Patch, in Liverpool Bay, and sank. Her crew were rescued. She was on a voyage from Penmaenmawr, Denbighshire to Liverpool, Lancashire.
Owner's Delight	United Kingdom	The sailing barge sank in Rye Bay. All on board were rescued. She was on a voyage from Southampton, Hampshire to London.

== 9 June ==
List of shipwrecks: 9 June 1851
Ship	State	Description
Arabian	United Kingdom	The steamship was driven ashore on Pelican Point, in the Gulf of Smyrna. She was on a voyage from Constantinople, Ottoman Empire to Liverpool, Lancashire. She had been refloated by 16 June and resumed her voyage on 18 June.
Atiet Rohoman	India	The ship was driven ashore and wrecked on Khanderi with the loss of at least 89, and up to 175, lives. She was on a voyage from Jeddah, Hejaz Vilayet to Mokha, Yemen Eyalet and Calcutta.
Christina	United Kingdom	The schooner was destroyed by fire near Fort William, Inverness-shire. She was on a voyage from Nairn to Liverpool, Lancashire.
John and Anne	United Kingdom	The ship was driven ashore and wrecked at Sutton Bridge, Lincolnshire. She was on a voyage from Middlesbrough, Yorkshire to Boston, Lincolnshire.
Mary	United Kingdom	The barque was driven onto the Swash, in the Bristol Channel.
Victor Marie	France	The ship was driven ashore at Leffrinckoucke, Nord. She was on a voyage from Sunderland, County Durham, United Kingdom to Nantes, Loire-Inférieure.

== 10 June ==
List of shipwrecks: 10 June 1851
Ship	State	Description
Anna	Kingdom of Hanover	The ship was driven ashore on the north coast of Læsø, Denmark. She was on a voyage from Königsberg, Prussia to London, United Kingdom. She was refloated the next day and taken in to Fredrikshavn, Denmark.
Mauritius Packet	(France) Mauritius	The ship capsized in a squall in the Indian Ocean. Her crew survived. She was on a voyage from Mauritius to Columbo, Ceylon.
Vansittart	Netherlands	The ship was driven onto the North Bank, in Liverpool Bay.

== 11 June ==
List of shipwrecks: 11 June 1851
Ship	State	Description
Anna	Kingdom of Hanover	The ship ran aground off Læsø, Denmark. She was on a voyage from Königsberg, Prussia to London, United Kingdom. She was refloated and put in to Frederikshavn, Denmark in a leaky condition.
Atiet Rohoman	India	The ship was wrecked at Kennery with the loss of nearly 200 lives. She was on a voyage from Mecca, Ottoman Arabia to Bombay.
Charlotte	United Kingdom	The full-rigged ship was wrecked about 30 miles south of Bombay, India as she was sailing from Calcutta to Bombay. The ship and cargo were lost, and two men lost their lives in attempting to reach shore.
Jessie Maria	United Kingdom	The ship was severely damaged by fire at Dublin.
Joseph Cripps	(United Kingdom of Great Britain and Ireland) New Zealand	The schooner was wrecked by a severe gale at Māhia Peninsula, Hawke's Bay. All hands were saved.
Maria Josephine	(United Kingdom of Great Britain and Ireland) New Zealand	The cutter had her rudder destroyed during a gale in Wellington Harbour and was driven on shore.
Plymouth	United Kingdom	The packet boat, a sloop, sprang a leak and foundered off Land's End, Cornwall with the loss of all 24 people on board. She was on a voyage from Plymouth, Devon to Liverpool, Lancashire.
Rover	United Kingdom	The brig ran aground at Waterford. She was on a voyage from Malta to Queenstown, County Cork. She was refloated but consequently had to be beached.
Star of the East	United Kingdom	The ship ran aground in Buydikheri Bay. She was on a voyage from Odesa to Falmouth, Cornwall or Queenstown. She was refloated and put in to Constantinople, Ottoman Empire.

== 12 June ==
List of shipwrecks: 12 June 1851
Ship	State	Description
Ann English	United Kingdom	The ship was lost off "Kulien", Denmark in a squall.
Moultan	United Kingdom	The ship was driven ashore and wrecked at New Calabar, Africa.

== 13 June ==
List of shipwrecks: 13 June 1851
Ship	State	Description
Taff	United Kingdom	The barque, which had capsized on 11 June, was abandoned in the Atlantic Ocean. All 70 people on board were rescued by Lesmahagow (United Kingdom). Taff was on her maiden voyage, from Cardiff, Glamorgan to New York, United States.

== 14 June ==
List of shipwrecks: 14 June 1851
Ship	State	Description
Taft	United Kingdom	The barque was abandoned in the Atlantic Ocean (46°51′N 35°31′W). All on board were rescued by Lesmahagow (United Kingdom). Taft was on a voyage from Cardiff, Glamorgan to New York.

== 16 June ==
List of shipwrecks: 16 June 1851
Ship	State	Description
Coquette	United Kingdom	The ship ran aground near Smyrna, Ottoman Empire. She was on a voyage from Smyrna to Bristol, Gloucestershire. She was later refloated.
Providence	United Kingdom	The sloop was driven ashore at Snettisham, Norfolk.

== 17 June ==
List of shipwrecks: 17 June 1851
Ship	State	Description
Charlotte	(United Kingdom of Great Britain and Ireland) British North America	The brig was wrecked off Portrush, County Antrim. Her crew were rescued. She was on a voyage from Saint John, New Brunswick to Coleraine, County Antrim.
Emma	United Kingdom	The smack ran aground and sank at Dublin. She was on a voyage from Liverpool, Lancashire to Dublin.
G. E. Routh	Kingdom of the Two Sicilies	The ship ran aground at Wexford, United Kingdom. She was on a voyage from Naples to Wexford.
Gordon	United Kingdom	The ship capsized or foundered in the North Sea off Texel, North Holland, Netherlands.
Robert and Henry	United Kingdom	The ship was run aground on the Filsand. She was on a voyage from Cardiff, Glamorgan to Kronstadt, Russian Empire. She was later refloated and completed her voyage, arriving at Kronstadt on 23 June.

== 18 June ==
List of shipwrecks: 18 June 1851
Ship	State	Description
Britannia	United Kingdom	The ship sank in the Boston Deeps, off the coast of Lincolnshire. Her crew were rescued. She was on a voyage from Newcastle upon Tyne, Northumberland to Wisbech, Cambridgeshire.
Defiance	United Kingdom	The ship foundered in the North Sea 100 nautical miles (190 km) off the coast of Jutland with the loss of a crew membe. She was on a voyage from Stettin to London.
Lancashire Witch	United Kingdom	The ship ran aground on the Blackwater Bank, in the Irish Sea off the coast of County Wexford. She was on a voyage from Liverpool, Lancashire to Puerto Rico. She was refloated and put in to Belfast, County Antrim in a leaky condition.

== 19 June ==
List of shipwrecks: 19 June 1851
Ship	State	Description
Ajax	France	The 474-ton whaling ship struck rocks in the Bering Sea south of Saint Lawrence Island and became a total loss.
Ellen	United States	The ship ran aground on the Romer Shoal. She was on a voyage from Porto, Portugal to New York, United States. She was refloated on 21 June and towed in to New York, arriving on 23 June.
Margaret	United Kingdom	The ship ran aground at the Holm Head, Suffolk. She was refloated and resumed her voyage.

== 20 June ==
List of shipwrecks: 20 June 1851
Ship	State	Description
Mary Stuart	United States	The brig was wrecked at the entrance to San Francisco Bay. All on board were rescued. She was on a voyage from San Francisco, California to Mazatlán, Cuba.

== 21 June ==
List of shipwrecks: 21 June 1851
Ship	State	Description
Ann Eliza	United Kingdom	The ship was wrecked off Puerto Plata, Dominican Republic. She was on a voyage from Puerto Plata to Cabaret, Haiti.
Munte	Netherlands	The koff sank in the North Sea. She was on a voyage from Stettin to King's Lynn, Norfolk, United Kingdom.
Royal Mint	United Kingdom	The ship was abandoned in the Atlantic Ocean. Her crew were rescued by Howard (Hamburg). Royal Mint was on a voyage from Dundee, Forfarshire to Quebec City, Province of Canada, British North America.

== 22 June ==
List of shipwrecks: 22 June 1851
Ship	State	Description
Jenny Lind	(United Kingdom of Great Britain and Ireland) British North America	The brig was wrecked on Grand Turk. She was on a voyage from Boston, Massachusetts, United States to St. Jago de Cuba, Cuba.
Triumph	United States	The ship was driven ashore at Humacao, Puerto Rico. She was later refloated and taken in to Kingston, Jamaica for repairs.

== 23 June ==
List of shipwrecks: 23 June 1851
Ship	State	Description
Pet	United Kingdom	The ship sprang a leak and was beached between Amherst and Green Island, Burma. She was on a voyage from Calcutta, India to Newcastle upon Tyne, Northumberland. She was refloated on 28 June with assistance from HMS Proserpine (Royal Navy) and towed in to Moulmein, Burma.
Princess Victoria	United Kingdom	The ship was wrecked between "False Salines" and "Point Atalia". . Her crew were rescued. She was on a voyage from Liverpool, Lancashire to Pará, Brazil.

== 24 June ==
List of shipwrecks: 24 June 1851
Ship	State	Description
Ecuador	Chile	The steamship was wrecked at Coquimbo. She was on a voyage from Coquimbo to Copiapó.

== 25 June ==
List of shipwrecks: 25 June 1851
Ship	State	Description
Experience	(United Kingdom of Great Britain and Ireland) Barbados	The ship was wrecked on Brown's Shoal, south of Nevis. She was on a voyage from Saint Thomas, Virgin Islands to Barbados.
Kedron	United Kingdom	The brig was wrecked off Trinidad. Her crew were rescued. She was on a voyage from New York, United States to Trinidad.
Keldy Castle	United Kingdom	The ship was destroyed by fire in the Atlantic Ocean. Her crew took to the boats. They were rescued by Colonel Maule (United Kingdom) on 30 June. Keldy Castle was on a voyage from Liverpool, Lancashire to Montevideo, Uruguay.
Pride	United Kingdom	The ship was wrecked near "Lerwig", Jutland. Her crew were rescued. She was on a voyage from Liverpool, Lancashire to Riga, Russia.
Randolph	United Kingdom	The full-rigged ship was wrecked on Amber Island with the loss of 25 lives. She was on a voyage from Lyttelton, New Zealand to London.
Thetis	United Kingdom	The schooner was run down and sunk by the steamship Columbia (United Kingdom) in the Irish Sea off Holyhead, Anglesey. She was on a voyage from Runcorn, Cheshire to Yarmouth. Thetis was refloated on 28 June and taken in to Holyhead.

== 26 June ==
List of shipwrecks: 26 June 1851
Ship	State	Description
Jean D'Arc	United Kingdom	The ship ran aground on the Corton Sand, in the North Sea off the coast of Suffolk. She was on a voyage from Hartlepool, County Durham to London. She was refloated and resumed her voyage.

== 27 June ==
List of shipwrecks: 27 June 1851
Ship	State	Description
Charlotte	(United Kingdom of Great Britain and Ireland) New Zealand	The brig was damaged at Lyttelton Harbour / Whakaraupō. Also reported as John and Charlotte.
John	(United Kingdom of Great Britain and Ireland) New Zealand	The brig was damaged at Lyttelton Harbour / Whakaraupō. Also reported as John and Charlotte.
Margaret	(United Kingdom of Great Britain and Ireland) New Zealand	The schooner sank at Lyttelton Harbour / Whakaraupō.
Pauline	(United Kingdom of Great Britain and Ireland) New Zealand	The schooner was damaged at Lyttelton Harbour / Whakaraupō. Also reported to be a brigantine driven ashore between 10 and 12 June.
Salopian	(United Kingdom of Great Britain and Ireland) New Zealand	The schooner was damaged at Lyttelton Harbour / Whakaraupō.
Torrington	(United Kingdom of Great Britain and Ireland) New Zealand	The brig was driven on shore and wrecked during a severe gale at Lyttelton Harbour / Whakaraupō. Her crew were rescued.
William and John	(United Kingdom of Great Britain and Ireland) New Zealand	The cutter was wrecked at Lyttelton Harbour / Whakaraupō.

== 28 June ==
List of shipwrecks: 28 June 1851
Ship	State	Description
Commerce	United Kingdom	The ship ran aground on the Herd Sand, in the North Sea off the coast of County Durham. She was on a voyage from Sunderland to South Shields.

== 29 June ==
List of shipwrecks: 29 June 1851
Ship	State	Description
Cecrops	United Kingdom	The ship was driven ashore and wrecked in the "Roman River", British Honduras.
Henry Campbell	United States	The ship was driven ashore at Bridgehampton, New York. She was on a voyage from London, United Kingdom to New York City.
James Orr	United Kingdom	The ship ran aground and sank at Wilmington, North Carolina, United States. She was on a voyage from Cardiff, Glamorgan to Wilmington.
Jane	United Kingdom	The brig was run down and sunk in the Atlantic Ocean by Lafayette (United States). Her crew were rescued by Lafayette. Jane was on a voyage from Quebec City, Province of Canada to a European port.
Jane	United Kingdom	The ship ran asround on the Woolseners, in the English Channel off the coast of Hampshire.
Wanskapen	Russia	The brig foundered in the Atlantic Ocean 3 leagues (9 nautical miles (17 km)) off Cabo Mondego, Portugal. Her crew were rescued. She was on a voyage from Newcastle upon Tyne, Northumberland, United Kingdom to Alexandria to Egypt.

== 30 June ==
List of shipwrecks: 30 June 1851
Ship	State	Description
Algerine	United States	The brig was driven ashore at Port Jackson, New South Wales. She had been refloated by 19 July but was waterlogged.
Proper	Denmark	The brig was wrecked on a reef off Ulloa, Republic of New Granada. All on board survived.

== Unknown date ==
List of shipwrecks: Unknown date in June 1851
Ship	State	Description
Åland	(Russian Empire) Grand Duchy of Finland	The ship was driven ashore near Turku before 7 June. She was on a voyage from Turku to Cádiz, Spain. She was refloated and put back to Turku.
Corynette	United Kingdom	The ship ran aground at Smyrna, Ottoman Empire. She was on a voyage from Smyrna to Bristol, Gloucestershire. She was refloated.
Diligenzia	Dominican Republic	The schooner was run down and sunk at Boca Chica by RMS Thames (United Kingdom) with the loss of one of the 30 people on board.
Elise Nicoline Sophie	Denmark	The ewer was driven ashore and wrecked at Thoborøn before 21 June.
Emblem	United Kingdom	The brig was abandoned in the Atlantic Ocean before 21 June. She was on a voyage from New York, United States to Halifax, Nova Scotia, British North America.
Emperor	United Kingdom	The ship was driven ashore at "Chowl". She was on a voyage from Liverpool, Lancashire to Bombay, India. She was refloated and completed her voyage, arriving at Bombay on 11 June.
Flirt	(United Kingdom of Great Britain and Ireland) New Zealand	The ship was driven ashore and severely damaged at Port Lyttelton between 10 and 12 June.
Halcyon	United States	The ship was abandoned in the Atlantic Ocean with the loss of one life. Survivors were rescued by two American vessels. Halcyon was on a voyage from Liverpool to New York.
Hawk	United Kingdom	The ship was driven ashore at Cape de Gatt, Spain. She was on a voyage from London to Athens, Greece. She was refloated and resumed her voyage, arriving at Athens on 14 June in a leaky condition.
Neptune	Kingdom of Hanover	The whaler, a brig, was sunk by ice. Her crew were rescued.
Nuevo Peppino	Austrian Empire	The ship was driven ashore near Sulina, Ottoman Empire. She was on a voyage from Brăila, Ottoman Empire to an English port.
Parsee Merchant	India	The ship was lost at the Sand Heads.
Philomène	United Kingdom	The ship was wrecked in the Hooghly River.
Sallie Fearn	United States	The ship was struck by lightning, set afire and abandoned in the Atlantic Ocean. All on board were rescued by Frank Johnson (United States). Sallie Fearn was on a voyage from New Orleans, Louisiana, to Liverpool.
Swallow	(United Kingdom of Great Britain and Ireland) New South Wales	The schooner was wrecked near Port Phillip Heads.
Tees	United Kingdom	The schooner was abandoned in the North Sea before 9 June. She was discovered by the brig Pomona (United Kingdom), which put two crew on her. The took her in to Blyth, Northumberland on 10 June.
Theodosia	United Kingdom	The ship collided with Cumberland (United Kingdom) in the Atlantic Ocean and was abandoned before 10 June. Eight crew were rescued by Georgiana (United Kingdom). Theodosia was on a voyage from Cartagena, Spain to Quebec City, Province of Canada, British North America.
Thetis	United Kingdom	The ship ran aground at "Realijo", Chile before 22 June.
Vesta	Norway	The ship ran aground on a reef off Saint Domingo and was severeloy damaged. She was on a voyage from New York to Kingston, Jamaica. She was refloated and completed her voyage, arriving on 24 May.
White Squall	(United Kingdom of Great Britain and Ireland) New South Wales	The schooner was lost in the Kent Group, Van Diemen's Land. She was on a voyage from Melbourne to Sydney.
