= Ospina =

Coordinates: 1°3′29″N 77°33′59″W

- Municipality and town
- Flag

- Location of the municipality and town of Ospina in the Nariño Department of Colombia.
- Country: Colombia
- Department: Nariño Department
- Time zone: UTC-5 (Colombia Standard Time)

Ospina is a municipality in the Nariño Department, Colombia. It includes a town of the same name.

== See also ==
- Germán Ospina
