= La Llanada =

Coordinates: 1.47778°N 77.5839°W

- Municipality and town
- Flag

- Location of the municipality and town of La Llanada in the Nariño Department of Colombia.
- Country: Colombia
- Department: Nariño Department
- Time zone: UTC-5 (Colombia Standard Time)

La Llanada is a town and municipality in the Nariño Department, Colombia.

== Climate ==
La Llanada has a warm subtropical highland climate (Köppen Cfb) with heavy rain for the majority of the year and a drier season from June to September.

Climate data for La Llanada
Month	Jan	Feb	Mar	Apr	May	Jun	Jul	Aug	Sep	Oct	Nov	Dec	Year
Mean daily maximum °C (°F)	19.8 (67.6)	19.9 (67.8)	20.2 (68.4)	20.4 (68.7)	20.5 (68.9)	20.4 (68.7)	20.6 (69.1)	20.7 (69.3)	20.8 (69.4)	20.1 (68.2)	19.2 (66.6)	19.3 (66.7)	20.2 (68.3)
Daily mean °C (°F)	15.3 (59.5)	15.4 (59.7)	15.5 (59.9)	15.8 (60.4)	15.8 (60.4)	15.5 (59.9)	15.5 (59.9)	15.4 (59.7)	15.6 (60.1)	15.4 (59.7)	14.9 (58.8)	15.0 (59.0)	15.4 (59.7)
Mean daily minimum °C (°F)	10.8 (51.4)	10.9 (51.6)	10.9 (51.6)	11.3 (52.3)	11.2 (52.2)	10.7 (51.3)	10.4 (50.7)	10.2 (50.4)	10.4 (50.7)	10.7 (51.3)	10.7 (51.3)	10.8 (51.4)	10.8 (51.3)
Average rainfall mm (inches)	290.1 (11.42)	203.4 (8.01)	235.4 (9.27)	232.0 (9.13)	220.5 (8.68)	97.6 (3.84)	65.8 (2.59)	52.0 (2.05)	124.9 (4.92)	316.5 (12.46)	340.6 (13.41)	367.7 (14.48)	2,546.5 (100.26)
Average rainy days	23	20	22	23	24	20	17	13	18	25	26	26	257
Source 1: Instituto de Hidrología, Meteorología y Estudios Ambientales
Source 2:
