= Belén, Nariño =

Coordinates: 1.66417°N 77.0175°W

- Municipality and town
- Flag

- Location of the municipality and town of Belén, Nariño in the Nariño Department of Colombia.
- Country: Colombia
- Department: Nariño Department
- Time zone: UTC-5 (Colombia Standard Time)

Belén is a town and municipality in the Nariño Department, Colombia.
