= Potosí, Nariño =

Coordinates: 0°48′29″N 77°34′22″W

Potosí
- Municipality and town
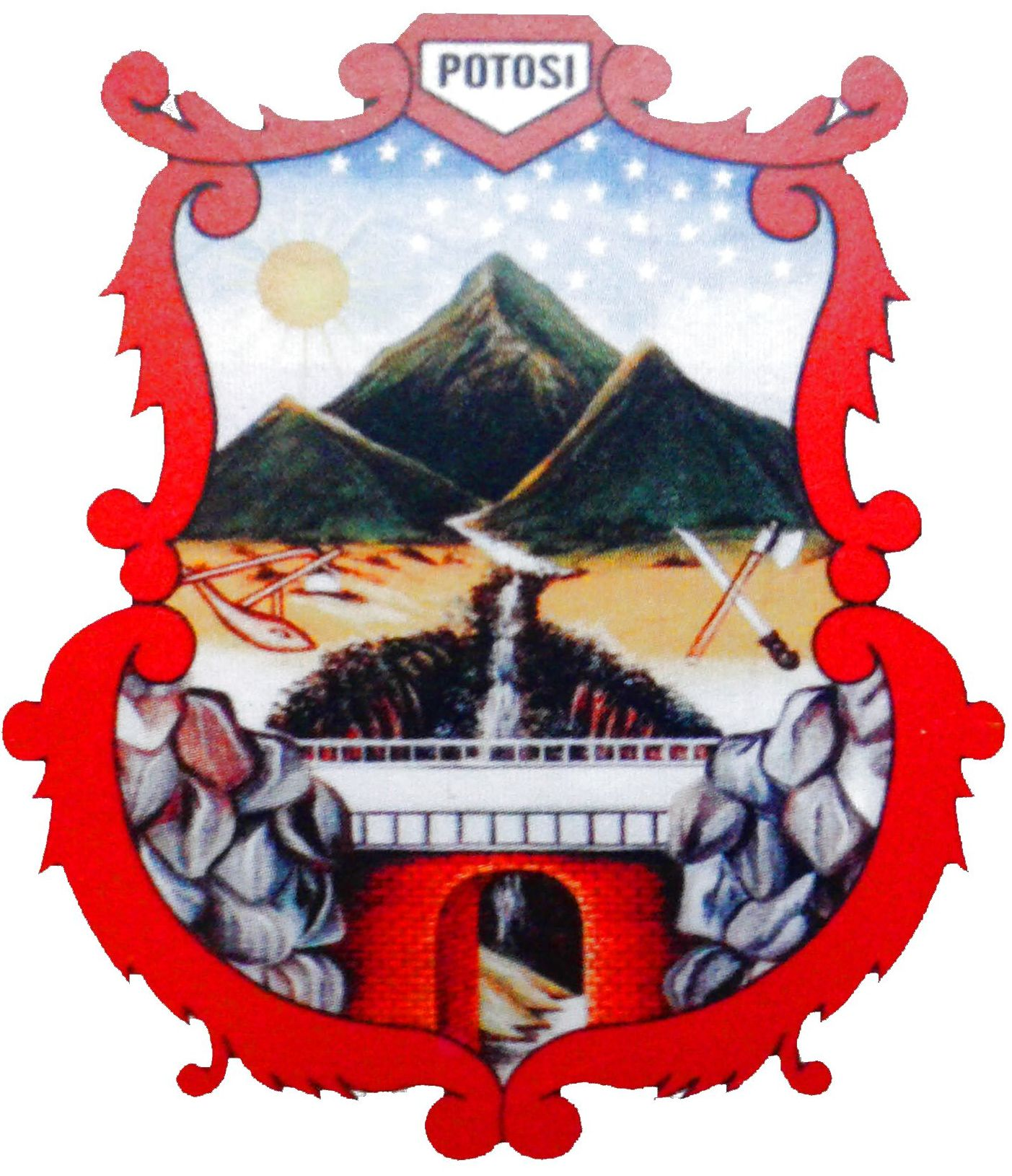
- Flag Coat of arms

- Location of the municipality and town of Potosí in the Nariño Department of Colombia.
- Country: Colombia
- Department: Nariño Department

Area
  - Total: 397 km^{2} (153 sq mi)

Population (Census 2018)
  - Total: 10,186
  - Density: 25.7/km^{2} (66.5/sq mi)
- Time zone: UTC-5 (Colombia Standard Time)

Potosí is a town and municipality in the Nariño Department, Colombia.
