= La Unión, Nariño =

Coordinates: 1.6019°N 77.1317°W

- Municipality and town
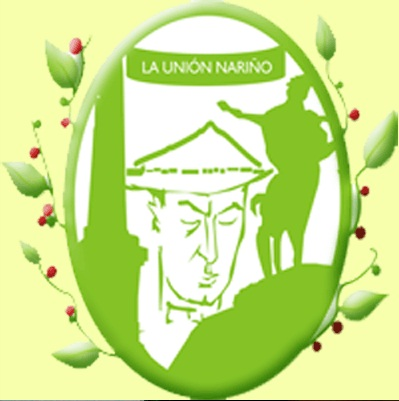
- Flag Coat of arms

- Location of the municipality and town of La Unión, Nariño in the Nariño Department of Colombia.
- Country: Colombia
- Department: Nariño Department

Population (Census 2018)
  - Total: 28,659
- Time zone: UTC-5 (Colombia Standard Time)

La Unión is a town and municipality in the Nariño Department, Colombia.
