= Cumbitara =

Coordinates: 1.67694°N 77.3253°W

- Municipality and town
- Flag

- Location of the municipality and town of Cumbitara in the Nariño Department of Colombia.
- Country: Colombia
- Department: Nariño Department

Area
  - Total: 280 km^{2} (110 sq mi)
- Elevation: 1,722 m (5,650 ft)

Population (Census 2018)
  - Total: 5,096
  - Density: 18/km^{2} (47/sq mi)
- Time zone: UTC-5 (Colombia Standard Time)

Cumbitara is a town and municipality in the Nariño Department, Colombia.
