= Puerres =

Coordinates: 0°52′54″N 77°30′29″W

- Municipality and town
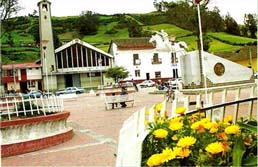
- View of Puerres

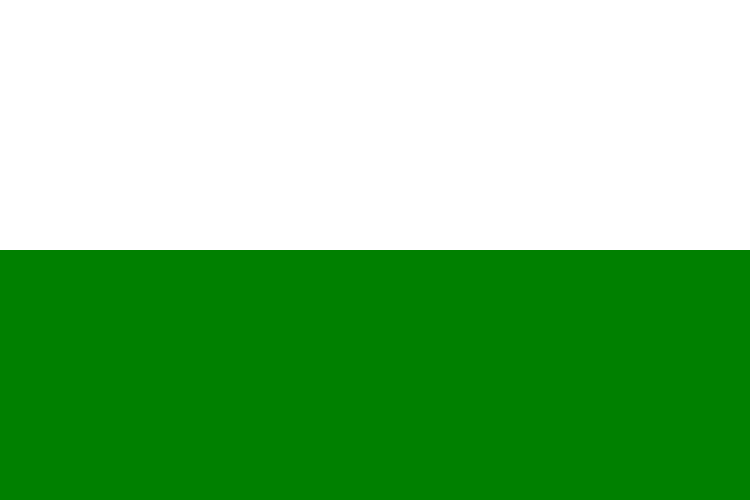
- Flag

- Location of the municipality and town of Puerres in the Nariño Department of Colombia.
- Country: Colombia
- Department: Nariño Department

Population
  - Total: 8,979
- Time zone: UTC-5 (Colombia Standard Time)

Puerres is a town and municipality in the Nariño Department, Colombia.

== Climate ==
Puerres has a comfortable subtropical highland climate (Köppen Cfb) with moderate rainfall year-round.

Climate data for Monopamba, Puerres, elevation 1,776 m (5,827 ft), (1981–2010)
Month	Jan	Feb	Mar	Apr	May	Jun	Jul	Aug	Sep	Oct	Nov	Dec	Year
Mean daily maximum °C (°F)	20.9 (69.6)	20.9 (69.6)	21.3 (70.3)	21.1 (70.0)	20.7 (69.3)	19.3 (66.7)	18.8 (65.8)	19.7 (67.5)	21.1 (70.0)	21.8 (71.2)	21.9 (71.4)	21.6 (70.9)	20.8 (69.4)
Daily mean °C (°F)	16.9 (62.4)	17 (63)	17.1 (62.8)	17.1 (62.8)	16.8 (62.2)	16.1 (61.0)	15.6 (60.1)	15.9 (60.6)	16.5 (61.7)	17.1 (62.8)	17.3 (63.1)	17.2 (63.0)	16.7 (62.1)
Mean daily minimum °C (°F)	13.5 (56.3)	13.7 (56.7)	13.7 (56.7)	13.9 (57.0)	14.1 (57.4)	13.7 (56.7)	12.9 (55.2)	12.9 (55.2)	13.0 (55.4)	13.3 (55.9)	13.6 (56.5)	13.7 (56.7)	13.5 (56.3)
Average precipitation mm (inches)	200.9 (7.91)	189.0 (7.44)	199.6 (7.86)	269.5 (10.61)	342.6 (13.49)	417.6 (16.44)	428.0 (16.85)	363.1 (14.30)	245.5 (9.67)	179.1 (7.05)	153.9 (6.06)	192.6 (7.58)	3,168 (124.72)
Average precipitation days	24	22	25	27	28	27	28	27	25	25	23	24	305
Average relative humidity (%)	90	89	89	90	90	91	91	91	89	88	88	89	90
Mean monthly sunshine hours	83.7	59.3	49.6	51.0	52.7	39.0	40.3	46.5	60.0	80.6	96.0	89.9	748.6
Mean daily sunshine hours	2.7	2.1	1.6	1.7	1.7	1.3	1.3	1.5	2.0	2.6	3.2	2.9	2.1
Source: Instituto de Hidrologia Meteorologia y Estudios Ambientales
