= Providencia, Nariño =

Coordinates: 1°14′20″N 77°35′51″W

Providencia
- Municipality and town
- Flag

- Location of the municipality and town of Providencia in the Nariño Department of Colombia.
- Country: Colombia
- Department: Nariño Department

Area
  - Total: 42 km^{2} (16 sq mi)

Population (Census 2018)
  - Total: 4,619
  - Density: 110/km^{2} (280/sq mi)
- Time zone: UTC-5 (Colombia Standard Time)

Providencia (Spanish pronunciation: [pɾoβiˈðensja]) is a town and municipality in the Nariño Department, Colombia.
