= Contadero =

Coordinates: 0.91°N 77.5506°W

- Municipality and town
- Flag

- Location of the municipality and town of Contadero in the Nariño Department of Colombia.
- Country: Colombia
- Department: Nariño Department
- Time zone: UTC-5 (Colombia Standard Time)

Contadero (Spanish pronunciation: [kontaˈðero]) is a municipality in the Nariño Department, Colombia. It includes a town of the same name.
