= El Rosario, Nariño =

Coordinates: 1°44′35″N 77°20′5″W

El Rosario
- Municipality and town
- Flag

- Location of the municipality and town of El Rosario, Nariño in the Nariño Department of Colombia.
- Country: Colombia
- Department: Nariño Department

Area
  - Total: 1,092 km^{2} (422 sq mi)

Population (Census 2018)
  - Total: 6,498
  - Density: 5.951/km^{2} (15.41/sq mi)
- Time zone: UTC-5 (Colombia Standard Time)

El Rosario (Spanish pronunciation: [el roˈsaɾjo]) is a town and municipality in the Nariño Department, Colombia.
