= San Pedro de Cartago =

Coordinates: 1°34′N 77°07′W

- Municipality and town
- Flag

- Location of the municipality and town of San Pedro de Cartago in the Nariño Department of Colombia.
- Country: Colombia
- Department: Nariño Department
- Time zone: UTC-5 (Colombia Standard Time)

San Pedro de Cartago (Spanish pronunciation: [sam ˈpeðɾo ðe kaɾˈtaɣo]) is a town and municipality in the Nariño Department, Colombia.
