= Pupiales =

Coordinates: 0°52′N 77°39′W

- Municipality and town
- Flag

- Location of the municipality and town of Pupiales in the Nariño Department of Colombia.
- Country: Colombia
- Department: Nariño Department

Population (Census 2018)
  - Total: 16,431
- Time zone: UTC-5 (Colombia Standard Time)

Pupiales is a town and municipality in the Nariño Department, Colombia.
