= Villagómez =

- Municipality and town
- Flag Coat of arms

- Location of the municipality and town inside Cundinamarca Department of Colombia

- Location in Colombia
- Coordinates: 5°17′N 74°12′W
- Country: Colombia
- Department: Cundinamarca
- Elevation: 1,575 m (5,167 ft)

Population (2015)
  - Total: 2,171
- Time zone: UTC-5 (Colombia Standard Time)

Villagómez is a municipality and town of Colombia in the department of Cundinamarca.
