= Iles, Nariño =

Coordinates: 0°58′N 77°31′W

Iles
- Municipality and town
- Flag Coat of arms

- Location of the municipality and town of Iles in the Nariño Department of Colombia.
- Country: Colombia
- Department: Nariño Department
- Time zone: UTC-5 (Colombia Standard Time)

Iles is a town and municipality in the Nariño Department, Colombia.
