= Imués =

Coordinates: 1°04′N 77°30′W

Imues
- Municipality and town
- Flag

- Location of the municipality and town of Imues in the Nariño Department of Colombia.
- Country: Colombia
- Department: Nariño Department
- Time zone: UTC-5 (Colombia Standard Time)

Imues is a town and municipality in the Nariño Department, Colombia.
