= Leiva, Nariño =

Coordinates: 1.9375°N 77.3081°W

- Municipality and town
- Flag

- Location of the municipality and town of Leiva, Nariño in the Nariño Department of Colombia.
- Country: Colombia
- Department: Nariño Department

Area
  - Total: 316 km^{2} (122 sq mi)

Population (Census 2018)
  - Total: 8,201
  - Density: 26.0/km^{2} (67.2/sq mi)
- Time zone: UTC-5 (Colombia Standard Time)

Leiva is a town and municipality in the Nariño Department, Colombia.
