= Sucre, Santander =

Coordinates: 5.923°N 73.795°W

- Municipality and town
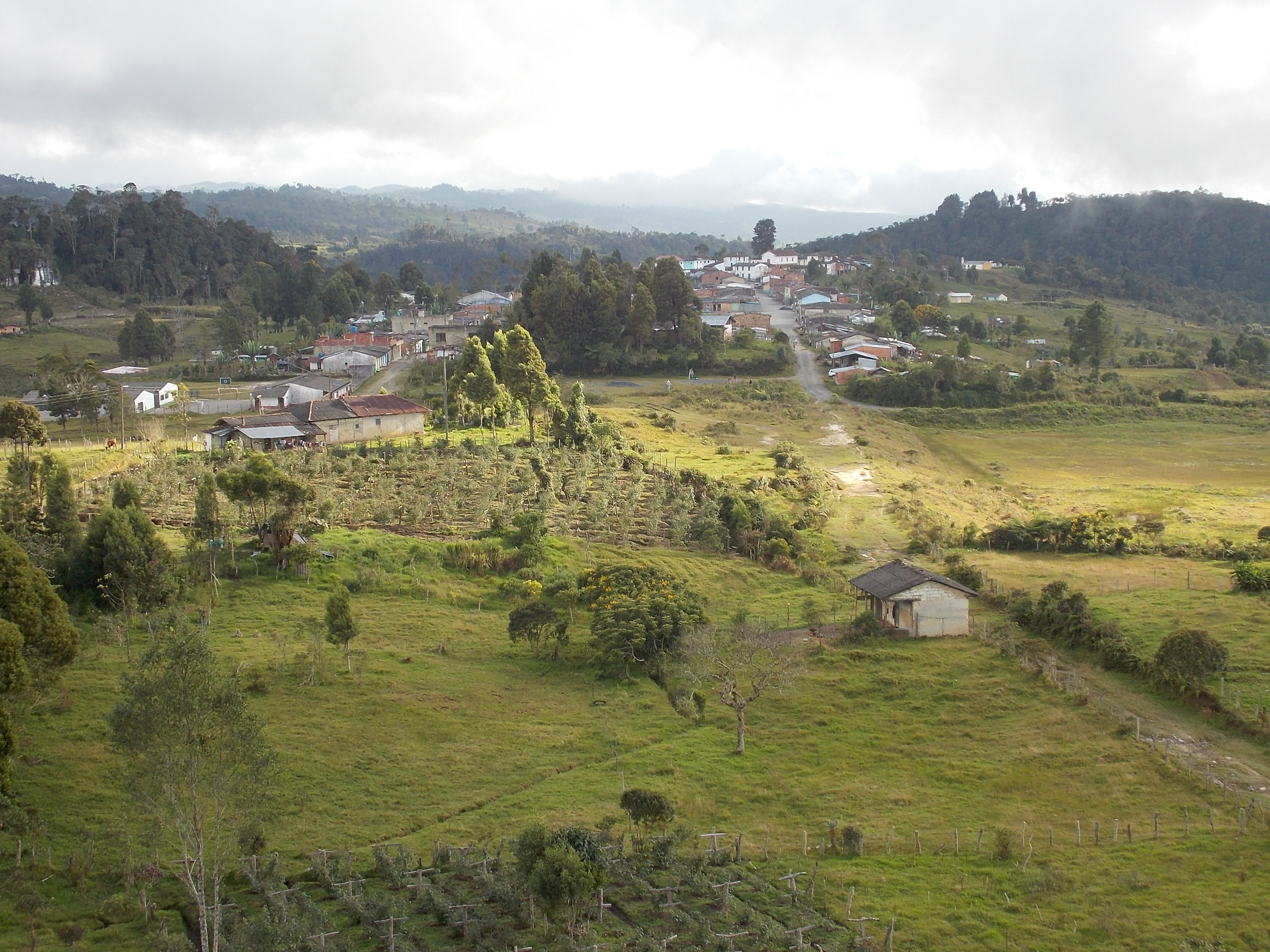
- Sabanagrande, a village in Sucre municipality

- Flag

- Location of the municipality and town of Sucre, Santander in the Santander Department of Colombia.
- Country: Colombia
- Department: Santander Department

Population
  - Total: 9,256
- Time zone: UTC-5 (Colombia Standard Time)

Sucre is a town and municipality in the Santander Department in northeastern Colombia.

== Climate ==
Sucre has a subtropical highland climate (Köppen Cfb) with heavy rainfall year-round.

Climate data for Sucre
Month	Jan	Feb	Mar	Apr	May	Jun	Jul	Aug	Sep	Oct	Nov	Dec	Year
Mean daily maximum °C (°F)	22.3 (72.1)	22.4 (72.3)	22.5 (72.5)	21.9 (71.4)	21.7 (71.1)	21.3 (70.3)	21.5 (70.7)	21.7 (71.1)	21.7 (71.1)	21.2 (70.2)	21.5 (70.7)	21.8 (71.2)	21.8 (71.2)
Daily mean °C (°F)	16.6 (61.9)	16.8 (62.2)	17.1 (62.8)	17.1 (62.8)	17.1 (62.8)	16.5 (61.7)	16.3 (61.3)	16.4 (61.5)	16.5 (61.7)	16.5 (61.7)	16.8 (62.2)	16.5 (61.7)	16.7 (62.0)
Mean daily minimum °C (°F)	10.9 (51.6)	11.3 (52.3)	11.8 (53.2)	12.4 (54.3)	12.5 (54.5)	11.8 (53.2)	11.2 (52.2)	11.2 (52.2)	11.4 (52.5)	11.9 (53.4)	12.1 (53.8)	11.2 (52.2)	11.6 (53.0)
Average rainfall mm (inches)	80.2 (3.16)	125.6 (4.94)	209.8 (8.26)	331.8 (13.06)	348.0 (13.70)	221.8 (8.73)	208.6 (8.21)	205.2 (8.08)	284.1 (11.19)	338.8 (13.34)	258.5 (10.18)	169.1 (6.66)	2,781.5 (109.51)
Average rainy days	8	13	16	21	22	17	15	15	19	22	18	13	199
Source 1: Instituto de Hidrologia Meteorologia y Estudios Ambientales
Source 2:
