= Gualmatán =

Coordinates: 0.919167°N 77.5661°W

- Municipality and town
- Flag Coat of arms

- Location of the municipality and town of Gualmatán in the Nariño Department of Colombia.
- Country: Colombia
- Department: Nariño Department

Area
  - Total: 36 km^{2} (14 sq mi)
- Elevation: 2,830 m (9,280 ft)

Population
  - Total: 6,200
  - Density: 172.22/km^{2} (446.0/sq mi)
- Time zone: UTC-5 (Colombia Standard Time)
- Website: http://www.gualmatan-narino.gov.co

Gualmatán (full name, San Francisco del Líbano de Gualmatán), is a town and municipality in the Nariño Department, Colombia.

== Climate ==
Gualmatán has a comfortable subtropical highland climate (Köppen Cfb) with moderate rainfall year-round.

Climate data for Gualmatán
Month	Jan	Feb	Mar	Apr	May	Jun	Jul	Aug	Sep	Oct	Nov	Dec	Year
Mean daily maximum °C (°F)	16.7 (62.1)	16.6 (61.9)	16.7 (62.1)	16.9 (62.4)	16.8 (62.2)	16.0 (60.8)	15.5 (59.9)	15.9 (60.6)	16.5 (61.7)	17.1 (62.8)	17.0 (62.6)	16.8 (62.2)	16.5 (61.8)
Daily mean °C (°F)	11.8 (53.2)	11.8 (53.2)	12.0 (53.6)	12.2 (54.0)	12.0 (53.6)	11.4 (52.5)	10.8 (51.4)	10.9 (51.6)	11.3 (52.3)	12.0 (53.6)	12.0 (53.6)	12.1 (53.8)	11.7 (53.0)
Mean daily minimum °C (°F)	6.9 (44.4)	7.1 (44.8)	7.3 (45.1)	7.5 (45.5)	7.3 (45.1)	6.8 (44.2)	6.2 (43.2)	6.1 (43.0)	6.2 (43.2)	6.9 (44.4)	7.0 (44.6)	7.4 (45.3)	6.9 (44.4)
Average rainfall mm (inches)	63.0 (2.48)	78.3 (3.08)	104.2 (4.10)	99.9 (3.93)	93.8 (3.69)	56.9 (2.24)	48.0 (1.89)	39.3 (1.55)	61.6 (2.43)	94.5 (3.72)	97.2 (3.83)	86.2 (3.39)	922.9 (36.33)
Average rainy days	12	13	15	15	17	14	14	14	12	15	16	15	172
Source 1: Instituto de Hidrología, Meteorología y Estudios Ambientales
Source 2:
