= El Tambo, Nariño =

Coordinates: 1.41306°N 77.3981°W

- Municipality and town
- Flag

- Location of the municipality and town of El Tambo, Nariño in the Nariño Department of Colombia.
- Country: Colombia
- Department: Nariño Department

Area
  - Total: 344 km^{2} (133 sq mi)

Population (Census 2018)
  - Total: 12,457
  - Density: 36.2/km^{2} (93.8/sq mi)
- Time zone: UTC-5 (Colombia Standard Time)

El Tambo is a town and municipality in the Nariño Department, Colombia.
