= Tangua, Nariño =

Coordinates: 1°06′N 77°24′W

- Municipality and town
- Flag Coat of arms

- Location of the municipality and town of Tangua, Nariño in the Nariño Department of Colombia.
- Country: Colombia
- Department: Nariño Department
- Time zone: UTC-5 (Colombia Standard Time)

Tangua is a town and municipality in the Nariño Department, Colombia.

== Climate ==
Climate data for Tangua (Sindagua), elevation 8,002 m (26,253 ft), (1981–2010)
| Month | Jan | Feb | Mar | Apr | May | Jun | Jul | Aug | Sep | Oct | Nov | Dec | Year |
|---|---|---|---|---|---|---|---|---|---|---|---|---|---|
| Mean daily maximum °C (°F) | 17.2 (63.0) | 17.4 (63.3) | 17.4 (63.3) | 17.6 (63.7) | 17.5 (63.5) | 17.4 (63.3) | 17.3 (63.1) | 17.7 (63.9) | 18.3 (64.9) | 18.0 (64.4) | 17.0 (62.6) | 16.9 (62.4) | 17.5 (63.5) |
| Daily mean °C (°F) | 13.1 (55.6) | 13.2 (55.8) | 13.2 (55.8) | 13.3 (55.9) | 13.3 (55.9) | 13.1 (55.6) | 12.9 (55.2) | 13.1 (55.6) | 13.3 (55.9) | 13.3 (55.9) | 12.9 (55.2) | 13.0 (55.4) | 13.1 (55.6) |
| Mean daily minimum °C (°F) | 9.2 (48.6) | 9.4 (48.9) | 9.7 (49.5) | 9.7 (49.5) | 9.7 (49.5) | 9.3 (48.7) | 8.8 (47.8) | 8.7 (47.7) | 8.9 (48.0) | 9.2 (48.6) | 9.5 (49.1) | 9.6 (49.3) | 9.3 (48.7) |
| Average precipitation mm (inches) | 91.3 (3.59) | 83.5 (3.29) | 91.0 (3.58) | 113.7 (4.48) | 94.1 (3.70) | 50.9 (2.00) | 29.4 (1.16) | 22.5 (0.89) | 50.8 (2.00) | 111.6 (4.39) | 137.8 (5.43) | 112.4 (4.43) | 989.0 (38.94) |
| Average precipitation days | 20 | 18 | 23 | 24 | 24 | 19 | 15 | 12 | 15 | 19 | 24 | 23 | 235 |
| Average relative humidity (%) | 80 | 80 | 80 | 80 | 80 | 79 | 77 | 75 | 75 | 78 | 82 | 81 | 79 |
| Mean monthly sunshine hours | 120.9 | 101.6 | 96.1 | 99.0 | 114.7 | 123.0 | 158.1 | 158.1 | 135.0 | 127.1 | 114.0 | 117.8 | 1,465.4 |
| Mean daily sunshine hours | 3.9 | 3.6 | 3.1 | 3.3 | 3.7 | 4.1 | 5.1 | 5.1 | 4.5 | 4.1 | 3.8 | 3.8 | 4.0 |
Source: Instituto de Hidrologia Meteorologia y Estudios Ambientales
