= Ancuya =

Coordinates: 1°16′N 77°32′W

- Municipality and town
- Flag

- Location of the municipality and town of Ancuya in the Nariño Department of Colombia.
- Country: Colombia
- Department: Nariño Department

Area
  - Municipality and town: 34 km^{2} (13 sq mi)
- Elevation: 1,400 m (4,600 ft)

Population
  - Municipality and town: 7,083
  - Urban: 1,601
- Time zone: UTC-5 (Colombia Standard Time)

Ancuya is a town and municipality in the Nariño Department, Colombia. According to a 2004 Wolfram Alpha population estimate, Ancuya had a population of 5852.
