= La Cruz, Nariño =

Coordinates: 1.60472°N 76.9742°W

- Municipality and town
- Flag Coat of arms

- Location of the municipality and town of La Cruz, Nariño in the Nariño Department of Colombia.
- Country: Colombia
- Department: Nariño Department

Government
  - Mayor: Marco Román Palacios

Area
  - Total: 257 km^{2} (99 sq mi)

Population (Census 2018)
  - Total: 16,674
  - Density: 64.9/km^{2} (168/sq mi)
- Time zone: UTC-5 (Colombia Standard Time)

La Cruz is a town and municipality in the Nariño Department, Colombia.
