= Nariño Department =

Department of Colombia

Department of Nariño Departamento de Nariño
- Department
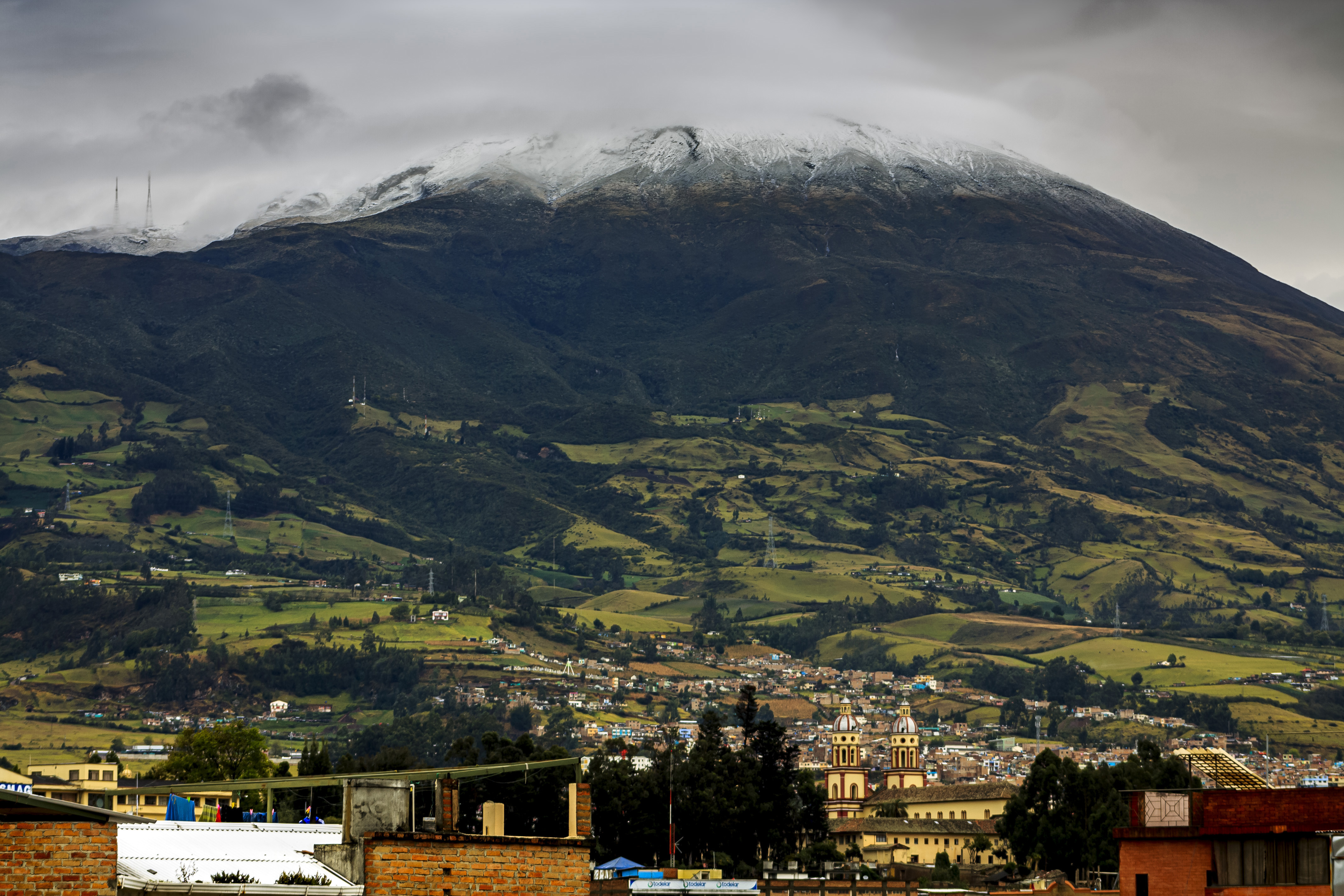
- View of Galeras

- Flag Coat of arms
- Motto: Desde el mar hasta el Galeras (Spanish: From the sea to the Galeras)
- Anthem: Himno del Departamento de Nariño
- Nariño shown in red

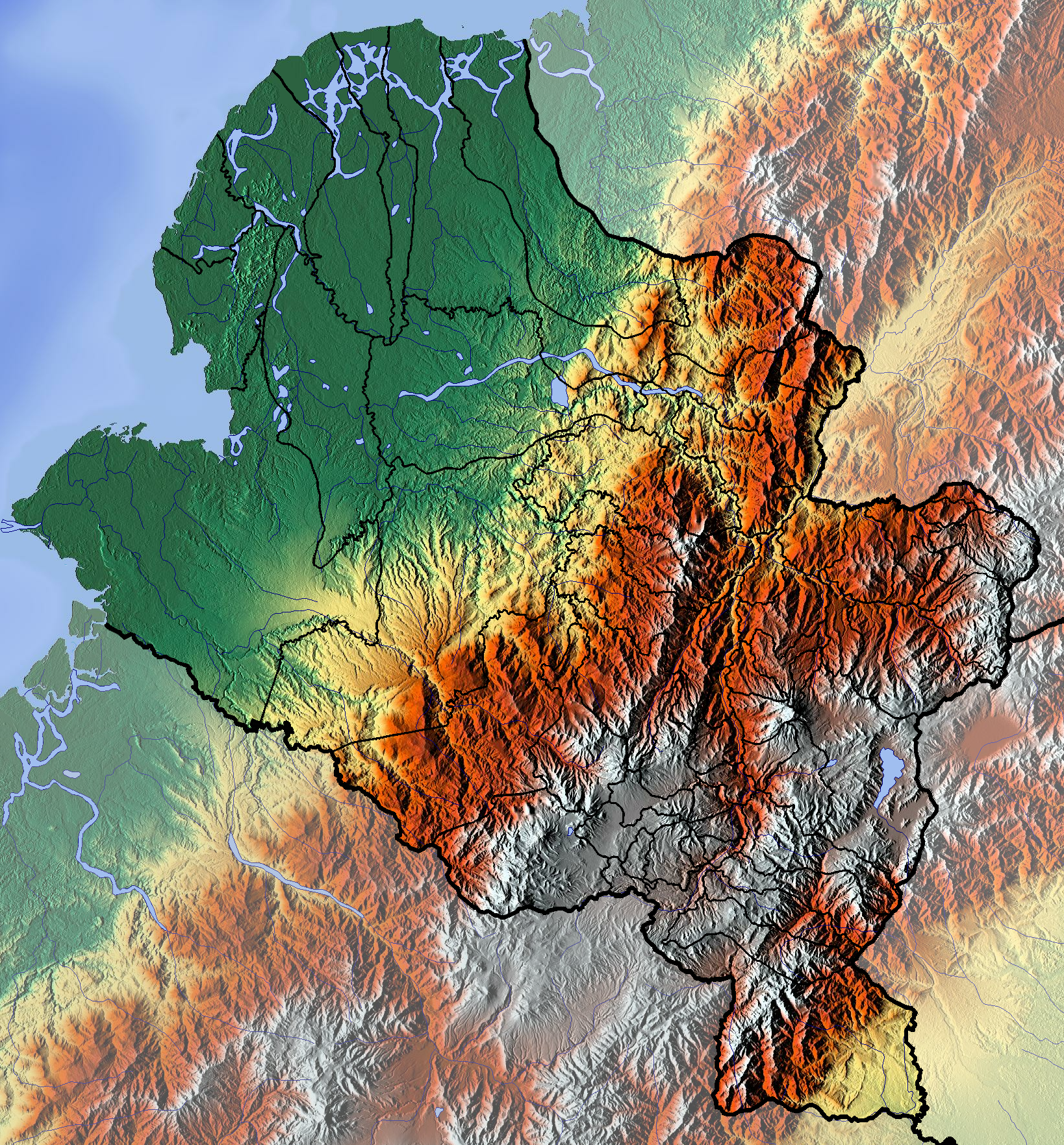
- Topography of the department
- Coordinates: 01°10′N 77°16′W
- Country: Colombia
- Region: Pacific Region/Andean Region
- Established: 6 August 1904
- Capital: Pasto

Government
  - Governor: Luis Alfonso Escobar (2024-2027) (Historic Pact for Colombia)

Area
  - Total: 33,268 km^{2} (12,845 sq mi)
  - Rank: 11th

Population (2018)
  - Total: 1,630,592
  - Rank: 8th
  - Density: 49.014/km^{2} (126.95/sq mi)

GDP
  - Total: COP 21,775 billion (US$ 5.1 billion)
- Time zone: UTC-05
- ISO 3166 code: CO-NAR
- Subregions: 13
- Municipalities: 64
- HDI: 0.742 high · 24th of 33
- Website: [Gobernación http://xn--nario-rta.gov.co/inicio/]

Nariño (Spanish pronunciation: [naˈɾiɲo]) is a department of Colombia named after independence leader Antonio Nariño. Its capital is Pasto. It is in the west of the country, bordering Ecuador and the Pacific Ocean.

Nariño has a diverse geography and varied climate according to altitude: hot in the plains of the Pacific and cold in the mountains, where most of the population resides, a situation that is repeated in a north-south direction. Other important cities include Tumaco and Ipiales.

== History ==
Historical population
Year	Pop.	±%
1973	809,178	—
1985	1,085,173	+34.1%
1993	1,443,671	+33.0%
2005	1,541,956	+6.8%
2018	1,630,592	+5.7%

The territory was occupied during the Pre-Columbian era by numerous Indian tribes, including Quillacingas, Awá, Pasto, and Tumas.

The first European conquistador who entered the territory was Andagoya Pascual in 1522, who traveled from the Colombian Pacific coast and then used information obtained by Francisco Pizarro to organize the expedition that culminated in the conquest of Peru.

Juan de Ampudia and Pedro de Añazco first explored the mountainous part of the department, commissioned by Sebastián de Belalcázar in 1535, who then toured the territory in 1536 and reached Popayán and remained for some time before leaving for Spain.

=== Major municipalities ===
==== Municipal population position ====
According to the latest census conducted in 2018, 1,335,521 people live in Nariño.

The city of Pasto and the municipalities of Chachagüí, Nariño, Tangua, Chía, Madrid and Yacuanquer form a single metropolitan area.

Rank	City or municipality	Inhabitants (2018)*
1	San Juan de Pasto	352,326
2	Tumaco	138,091
3	Ipiales	105,517
4	Túquerres	42,413
5	Barbacoas	34,248
6	Cumbal	32,672
7	La Unión	28,659
8	Samaniego	23,727
9	Olaya Herrera	21,415
10	Magüí Payán	18,262
Source: DANE *projection

== Administrative divisions ==
Nariño Subregions

Nariño is composed of thirteen subregions and 64 municipalities organized among them:

- Centro: Pasto, Chachagüí, La Florida, Nariño, Tangua and Yacuanquer.
- Guambuyaco: El Peñol, El Tambo, La Llanada and Los Andes.
- Juanambú: Arboleda, Buesaco, La Unión, San Pedro de Cartago and San Lorenzo.
- La Cordillera: Cumbitara, El Rosario, Leiva, Policarpa and Taminango.
- La Sabana: Guaitarilla, Imués, Ospina, Sapuyes and Túquerres.
- Los Abades: Providencia, Samaniego and Santa Cruz.
- Obando: Aldana, Contadero, Córdoba, Cuaspud, Cumbal, Funes, Guachucal, Gualmatán, Iles, Ipiales, Potosí, Puerres and Pupiales.
- Occidente: Ancuya, Consaca, Linares and Sandona.
- Pacífico Sur: Francisco Pizarro and Tumaco.
- Piedemonte Costero: Mallama and Ricaurte.
- Río Mayo: Belén, Colón, El Tablón, La Cruz, San Bernardo, San José de Albán and San Pablo.
- Sanquianga: El Charco, La Tola, Mosquera, Olaya Herrera and Santa Bárbara.
- Telembí: Barbacoas, Magüí Payán and Roberto Payán.

== See also ==
- Las Lajas Sanctuary
- Laguna de la Cocha
- Carnaval de Negros y Blancos
