= Funes, Nariño =

Coordinates: 1°00′N 77°27′W

- Municipality and town
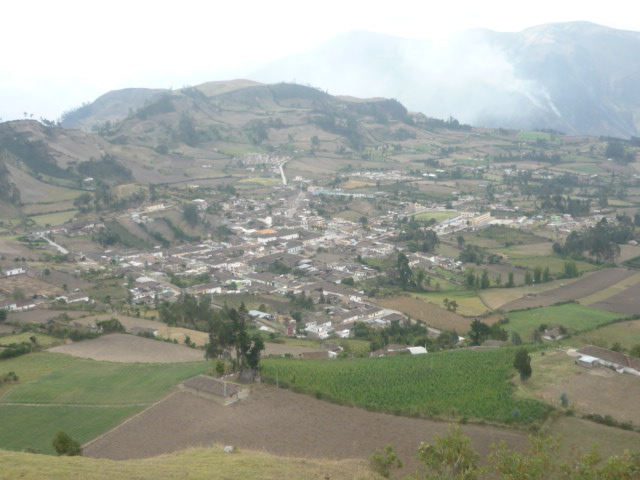
- View of Funesnariño.jpg

- Flag

- Location of the municipality and town of Funes, Nariño in the Nariño Department of Colombia.
- Country: Colombia
- Department: Nariño Department
- Time zone: UTC-5 (Colombia Standard Time)
- Website: www.facebook.com/alcaldiadefunes

Funes is a municipality in the Nariño Department, Colombia. It includes a town of the same name.
