= Mallama =

- Municipality and town
- Flag

- Location of the municipality and town of Mallama in the Nariño Department of Colombia
- Coordinates: 1°8′28″N 77°51′52″W
- Country: Colombia
- Department: Nariño Department
- Time zone: UTC-5 (Colombia Standard Time)

Mallama is a municipality in the Nariño Department, Colombia. It includes a town of the same name.
