= Guaitarilla =

Coordinates: 1.13333°N 77.5564°W

- Municipality and town
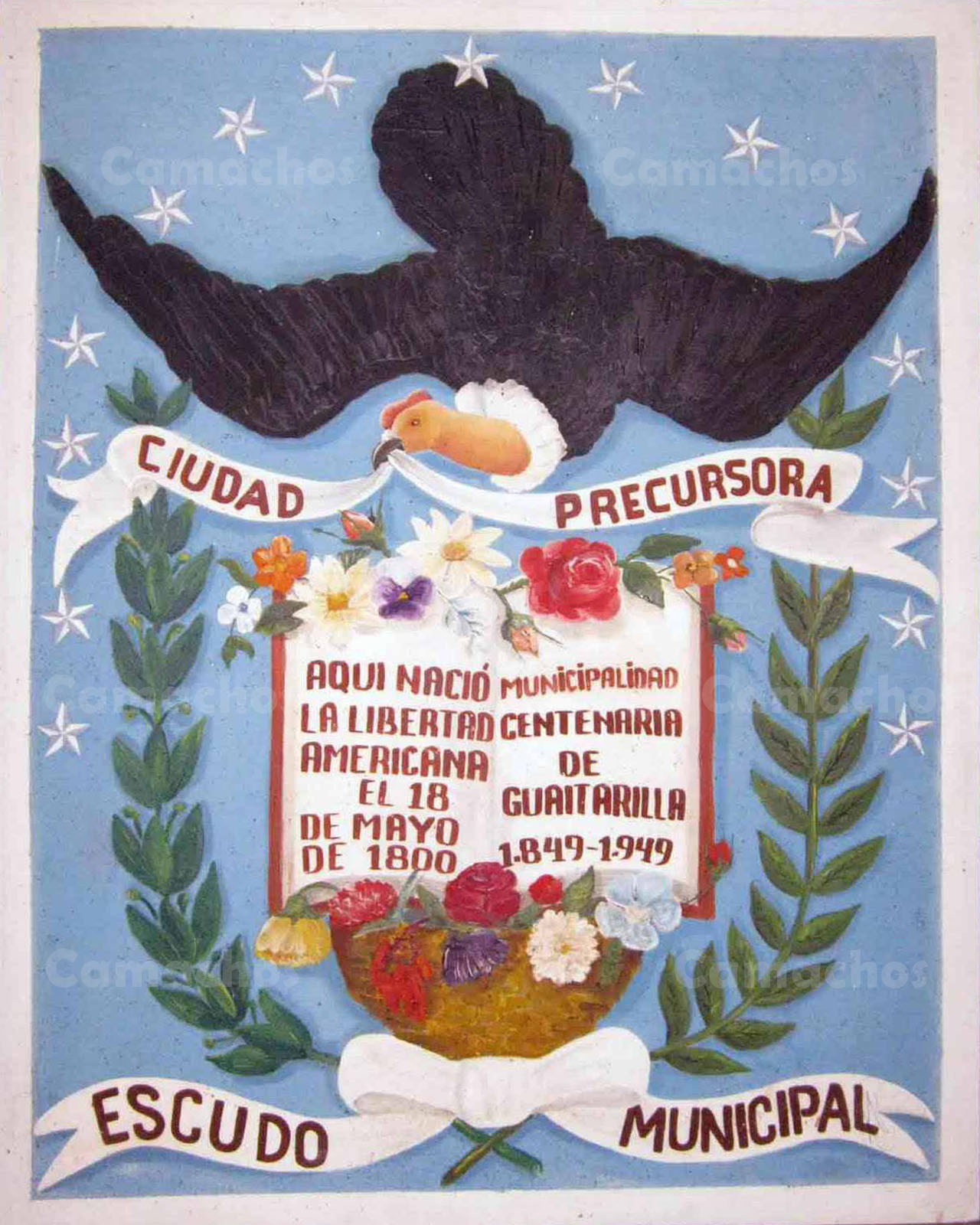
- Coat of arms

- Location of the municipality and town of Guaitarilla in the Nariño Department of Colombia.
- Country: Colombia
- Department: Nariño Department

Area
  - Total: 121 km^{2} (47 sq mi)

Population (Census 2018)
  - Total: 10,774
  - Density: 89.0/km^{2} (231/sq mi)
- Time zone: UTC-5 (Colombia Standard Time)

Guaitarilla is a town and municipality in the Nariño Department, Colombia.
