= Ulloa, Valle del Cauca =

Coordinates: 4°43′N 75°45′W

Ulloa, Colombia
- Municipality and town
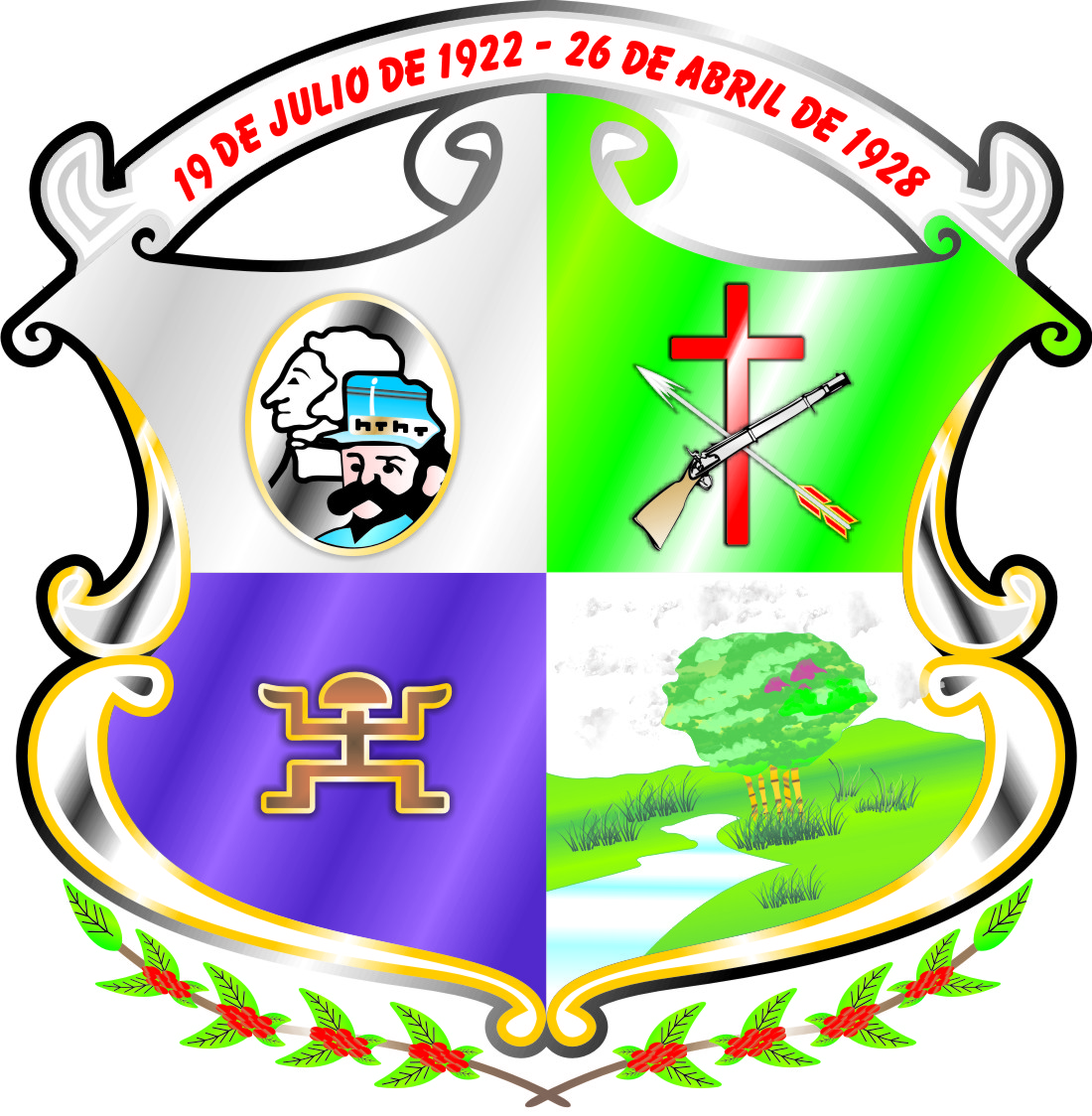
- Flag Coat of arms

- Location of the municipality and town of Ulloa, Colombia in the Valle del Cauca Department of Colombia.
- Country: Colombia
- Department: Valle del Cauca Department

Population (2015)
  - Total: 5,457
- Time zone: UTC-5 (Colombia Standard Time)

Ulloa is a town and municipality located in the Department of Valle del Cauca, Colombia.
