= San Lorenzo, Nariño =

Coordinates: 1.50389°N 77.2178°W

- Municipality and town
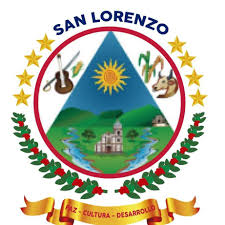
- Coat of arms

- Location of the municipality and town of San Lorenzo, Nariño in the Nariño Department of Colombia.
- Country: Colombia
- Department: Nariño Department

Population (Census 2018)
  - Total: 16,653
- Time zone: UTC-5 (Colombia Standard Time)

San Lorenzo (Spanish pronunciation: [san loˈɾenso]) is a town and municipality in the Nariño Department, Colombia.
