= Montes de María =

- Location within Colombia

Highest point
- Peak: Maco, Cansona and La Pita
- Elevation: 1,000 m (3,300 ft)

Dimensions
- Area: 2,677 km^{2} (1,034 mi^{2})

Geography
- Country: Colombia
- Range coordinates: 09°34′42″N 75°16′15″W

The Montes de María is an isolated group of small mountains near the northern coast of Colombia in the Caribbean Region. The Montes de María (also known as Serranía de San Jacinto) are the last part of the Serranía de San Jerónimo which extends from the West Andes. A part of the mountains are protected as the Los Colorados fauna and flora sanctuary.

Montes de María is a zone located in the center of the Colombian Departments of Bolívar and Sucre. The following towns are part of the Montes de María: El Carmen de Bolívar, María La Baja, San Juan Nepomuceno, San Jacinto, Córdoba, Zambrano and El Guamo in Bolívar; Ovejas, Chalán, Colosó, Morroa, Toluviejo, Los Palmitos and San Onofre in Sucre.

It has a total area of 6,317 km^{2} (2,439 sq mi), of which 3,798 km^{2} (1,466 sq mi) are in Bolívar and 2,519 km^{2} (973 sq mi) in Sucre. This area has a population of about 330,889.

Montes de María comprises two zones: The first zone called Baja Montaña is relatively flat with no mountains: the area located between the Troncal de Occidente and the Magdalena River is dedicated to cattle-raising and forestry, while the area located between the Transversal del Caribe and the Canal del Dique is mainly agricultural. A second zone called Alta Montaña is located between the Transversal del Caribe and Troncal de Occidente which has agriculture as the main activity.

== Sources ==
- Villalobos, Hermes Cuadros (2007). "Vegetación Caribeña" (in Spanish). Biblioteca Luis Ángel Arango.
