= Pueblos Patrimonio =

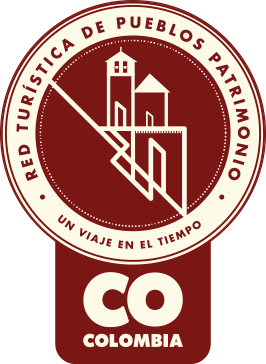
Programme logo

La Red Turística de Pueblos Patrimonio ("The Tourism Network of Heritage Towns") is an initiative led by Colombia's Ministry of Commerce, Industry, and Tourism, with the assistance of the Ministry of Culture. It is administered by the National Tourism Foundation (FONTUR).

The program seeks to promote tourism in a network of small and mid-sized towns that represent aspects of Colombia's cultural heritage, and to encourage sustainable economic development in these communities. Pueblos Patrimonio are selected from amongst Colombia's inventory of designated Bienes de Interés Cultural (Cultural Heritage Assets) on the merits of their architectural, historical, and environmental characteristics, as well as unique cultural identities, which give them the potential to become "true cultural destinations."

The network was first established in 2010, with an inaugural class of 11 municipalities. As of 1 March 2021, there were 18 designated Pueblos Patrimonio, distributed among 12 of Colombia's 32 departments.

== List of Current Pueblos Patrimonio ==
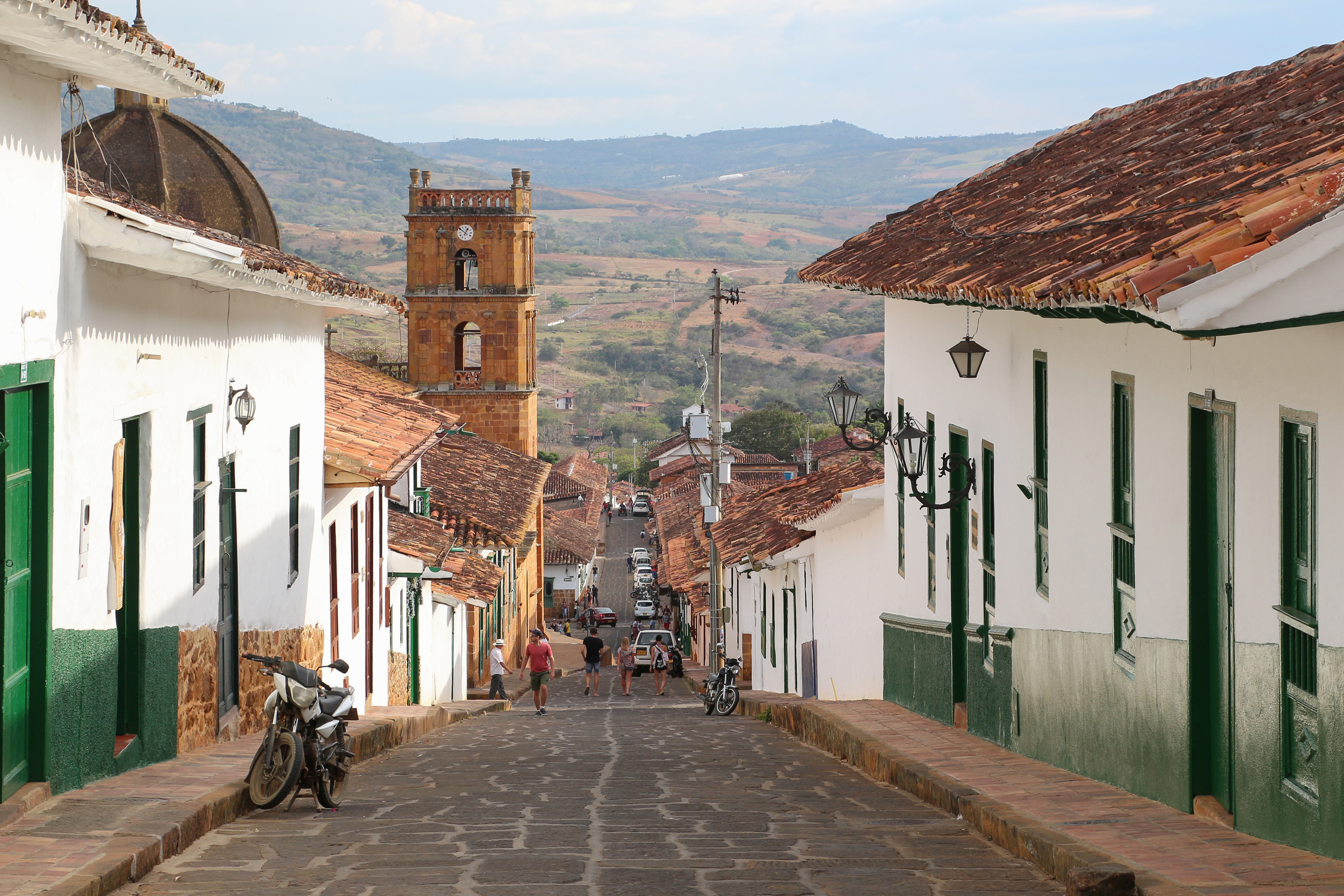
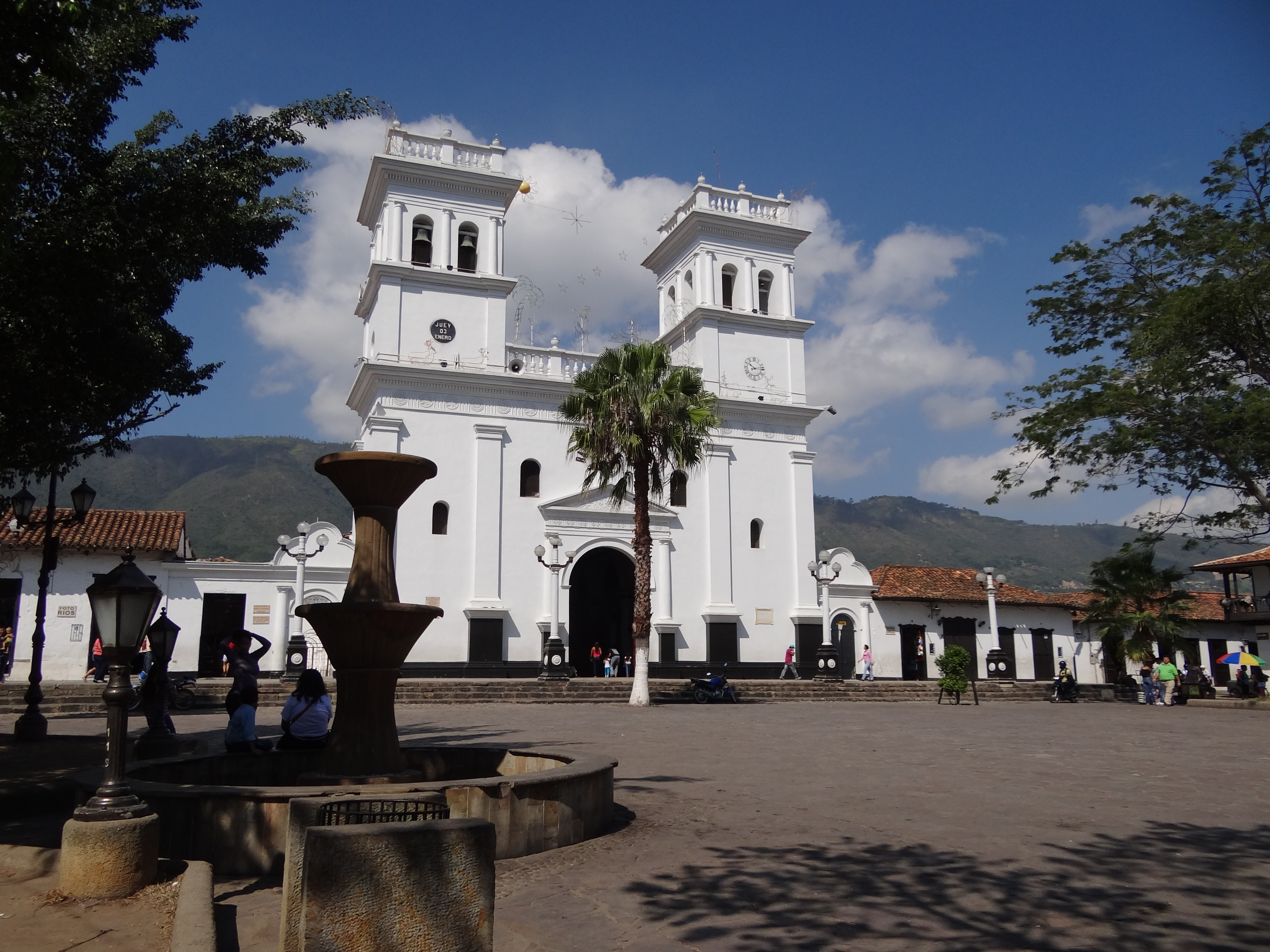
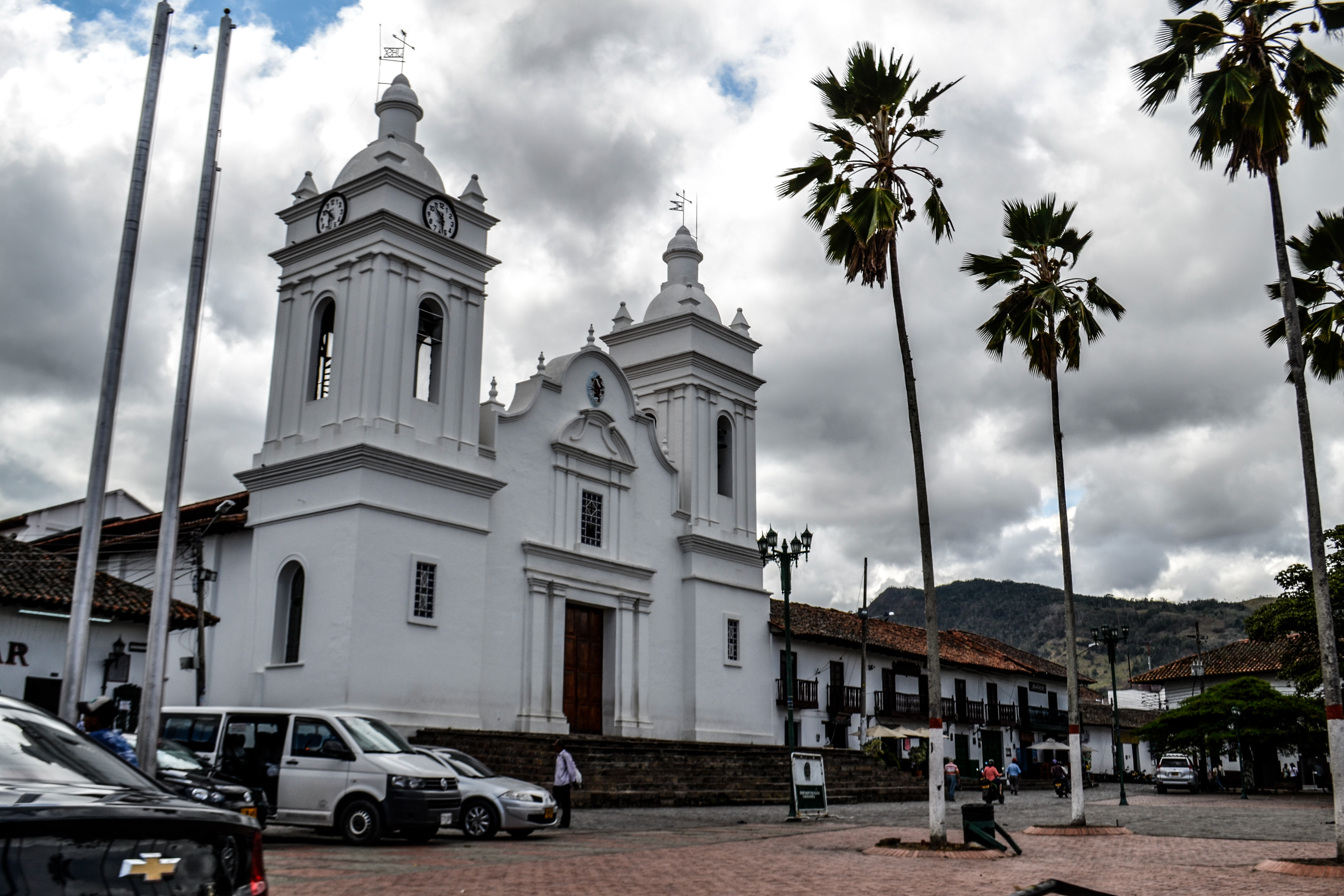
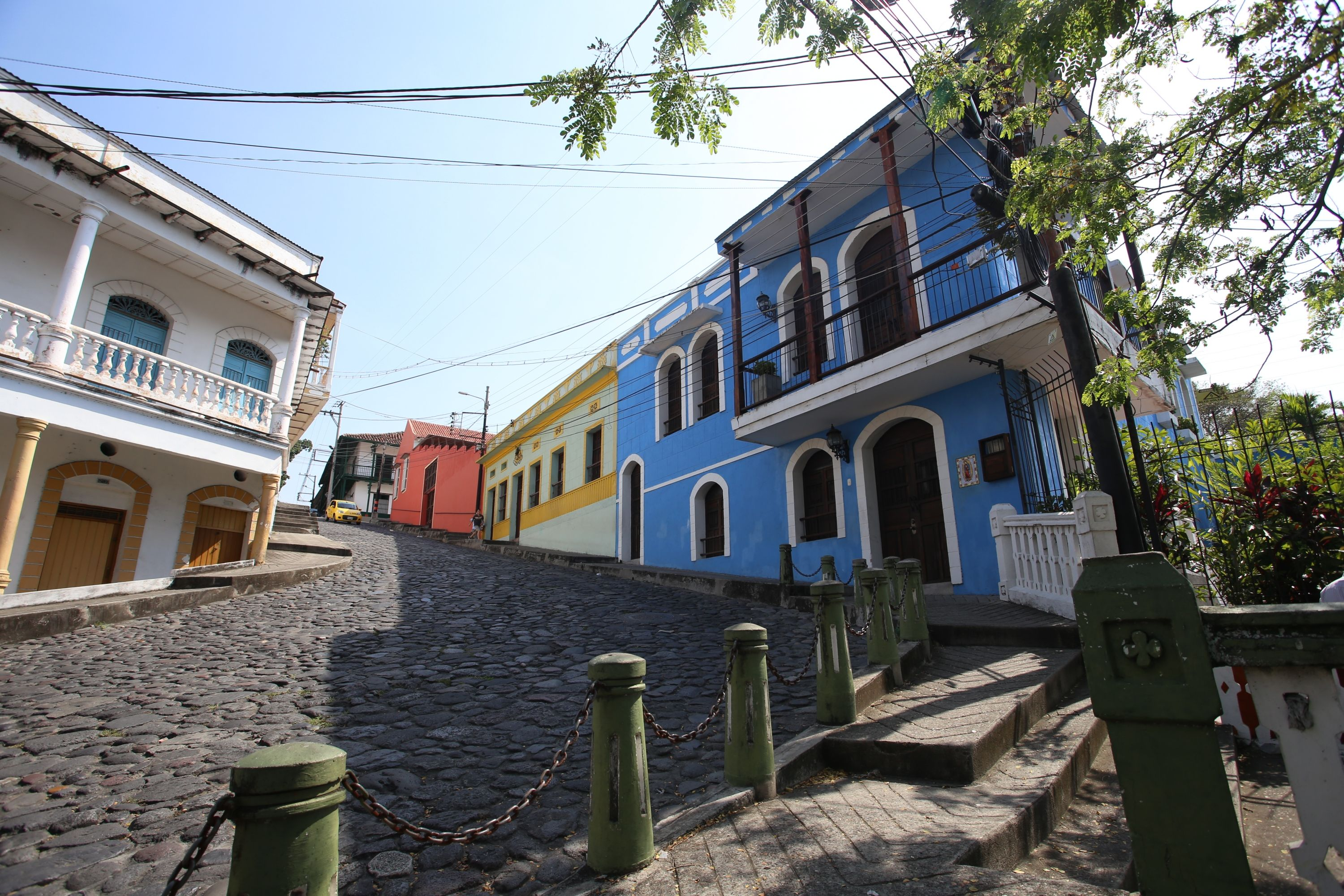
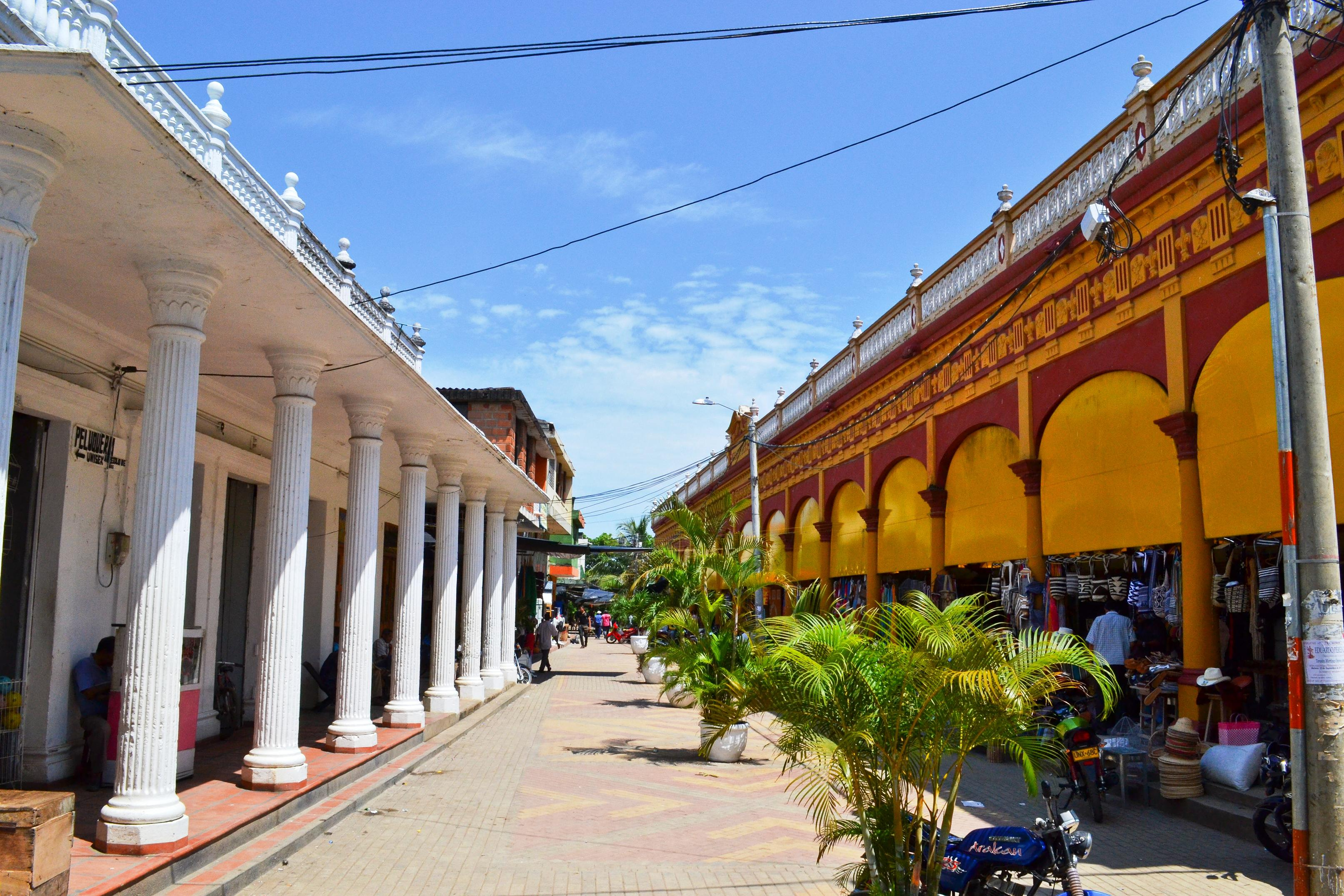
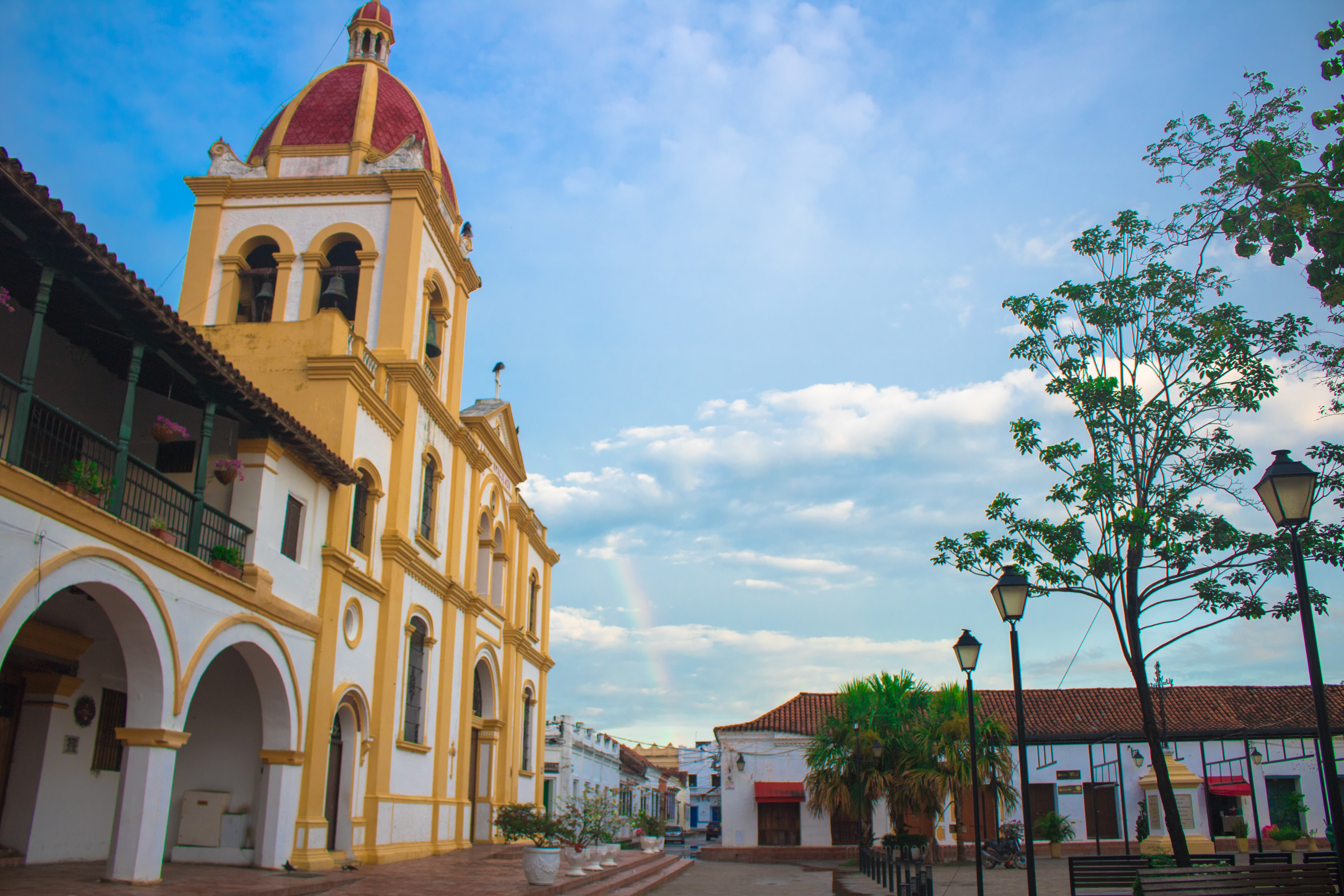
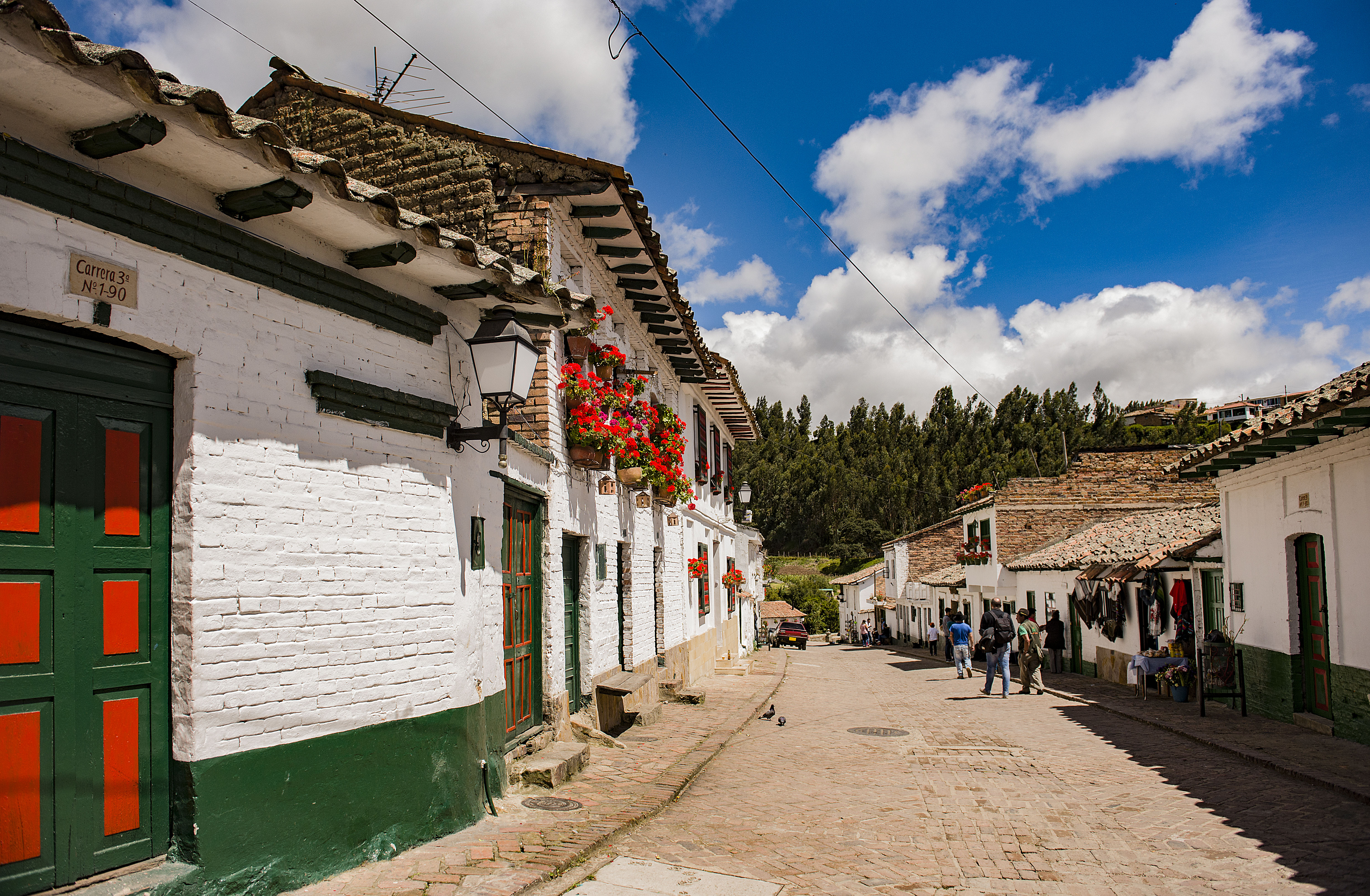
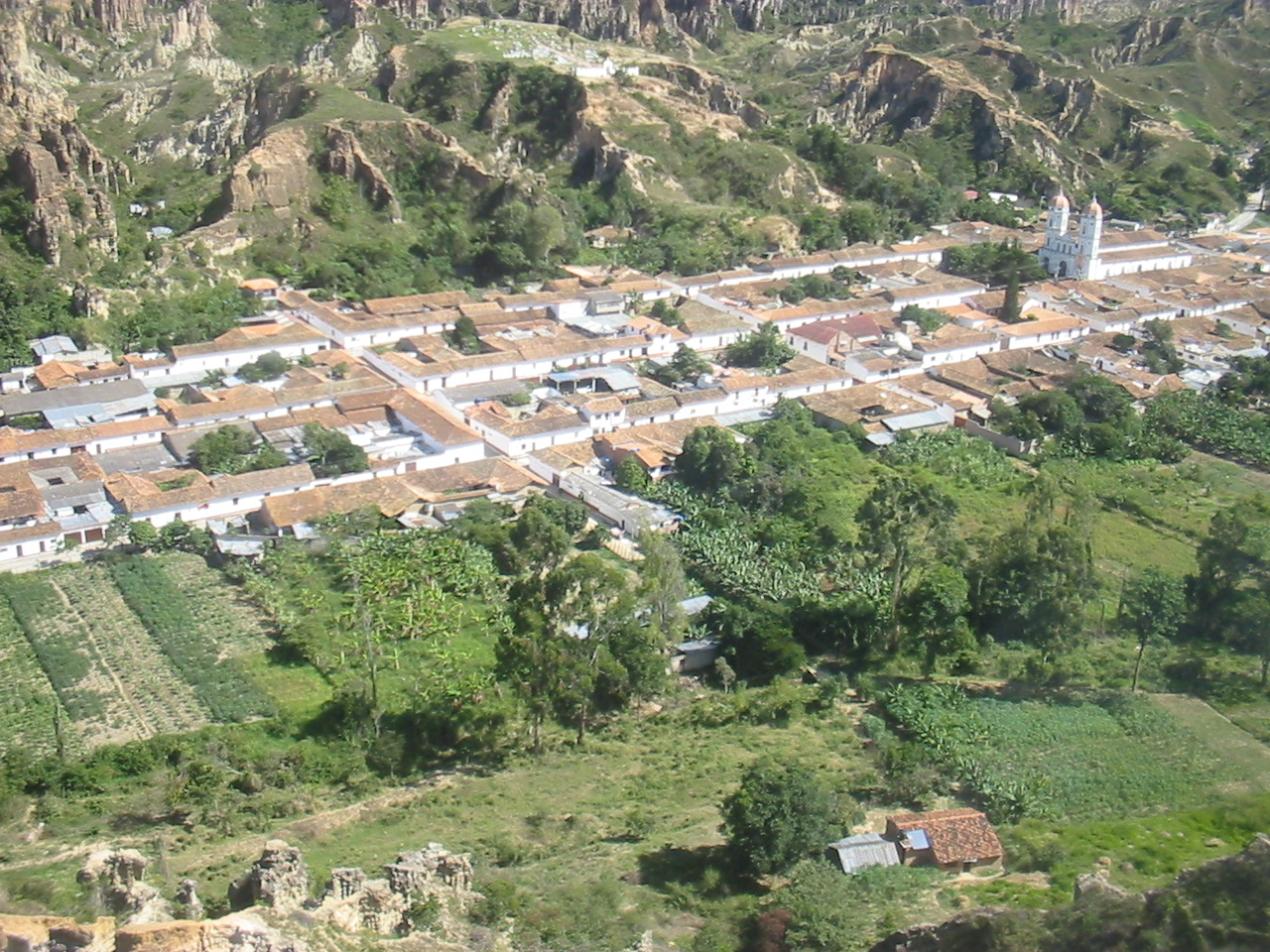
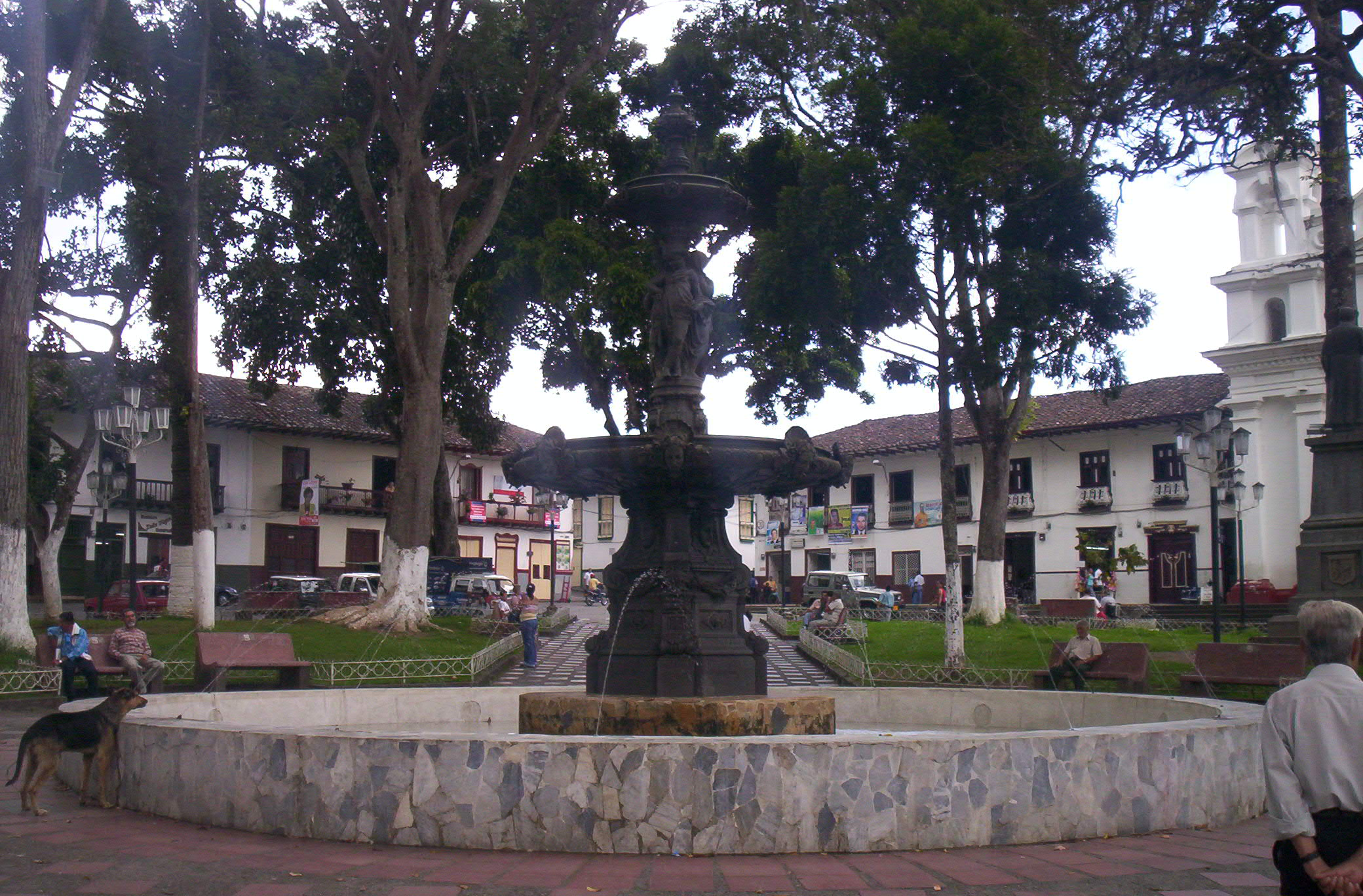
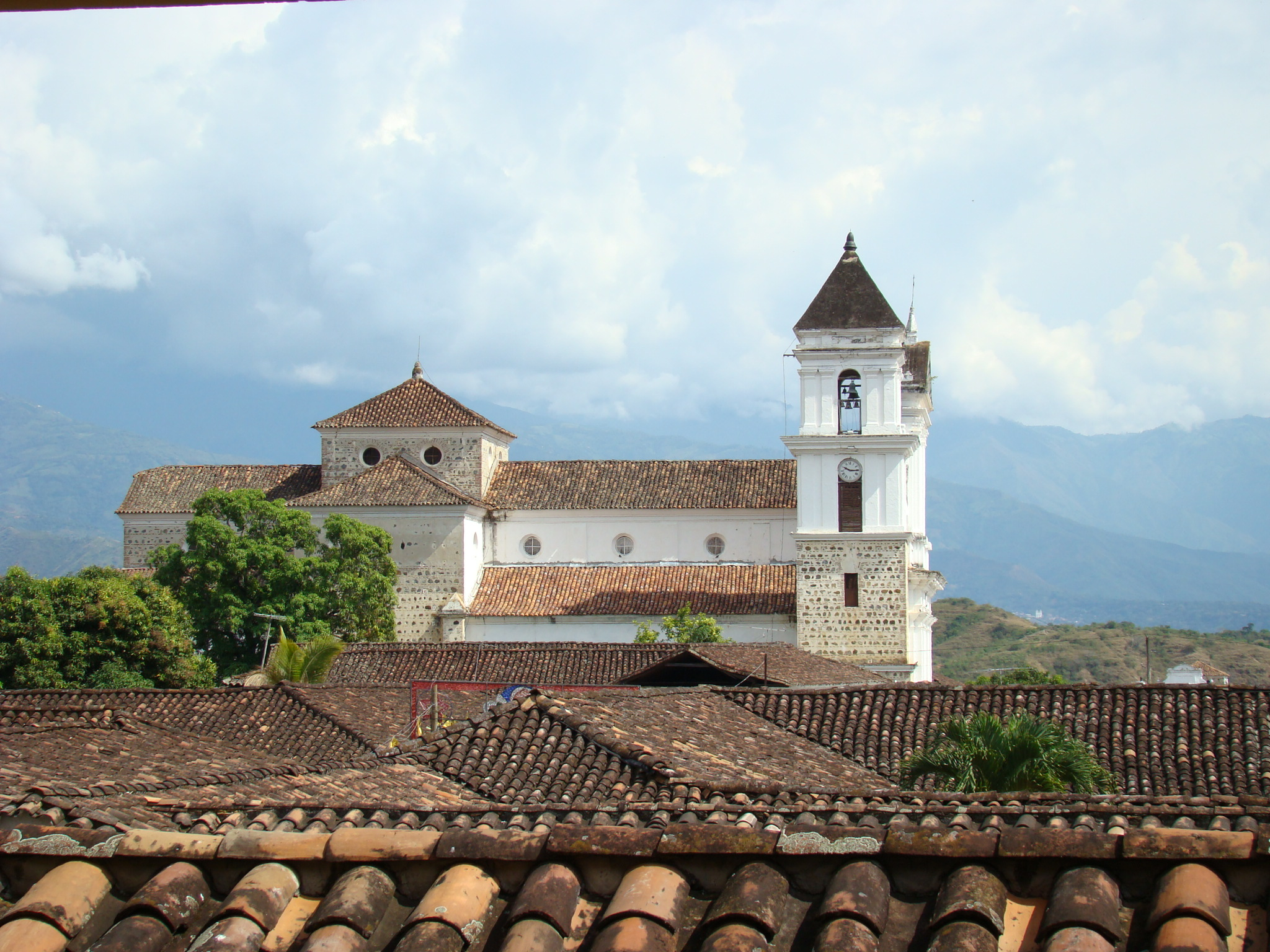
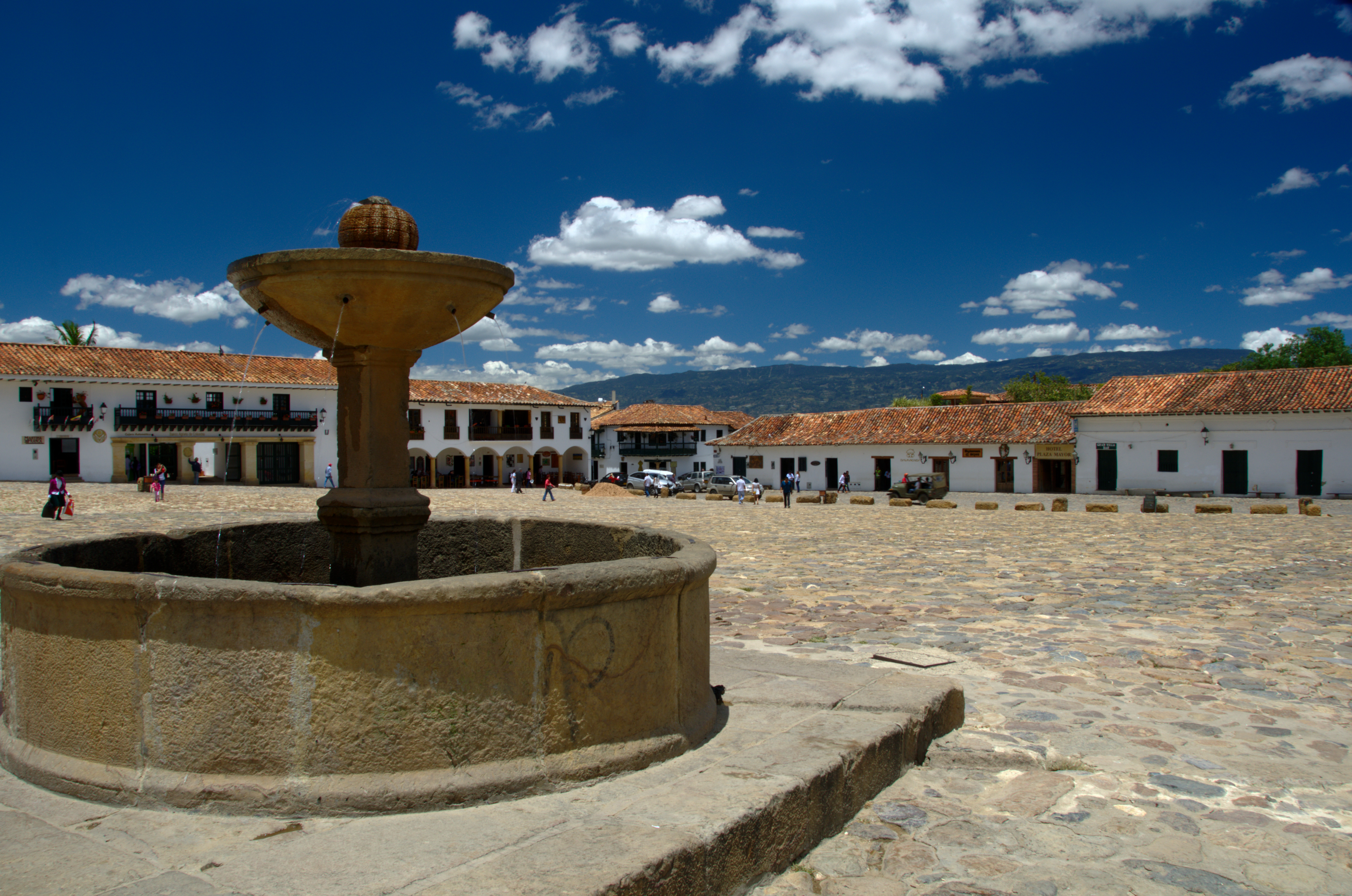
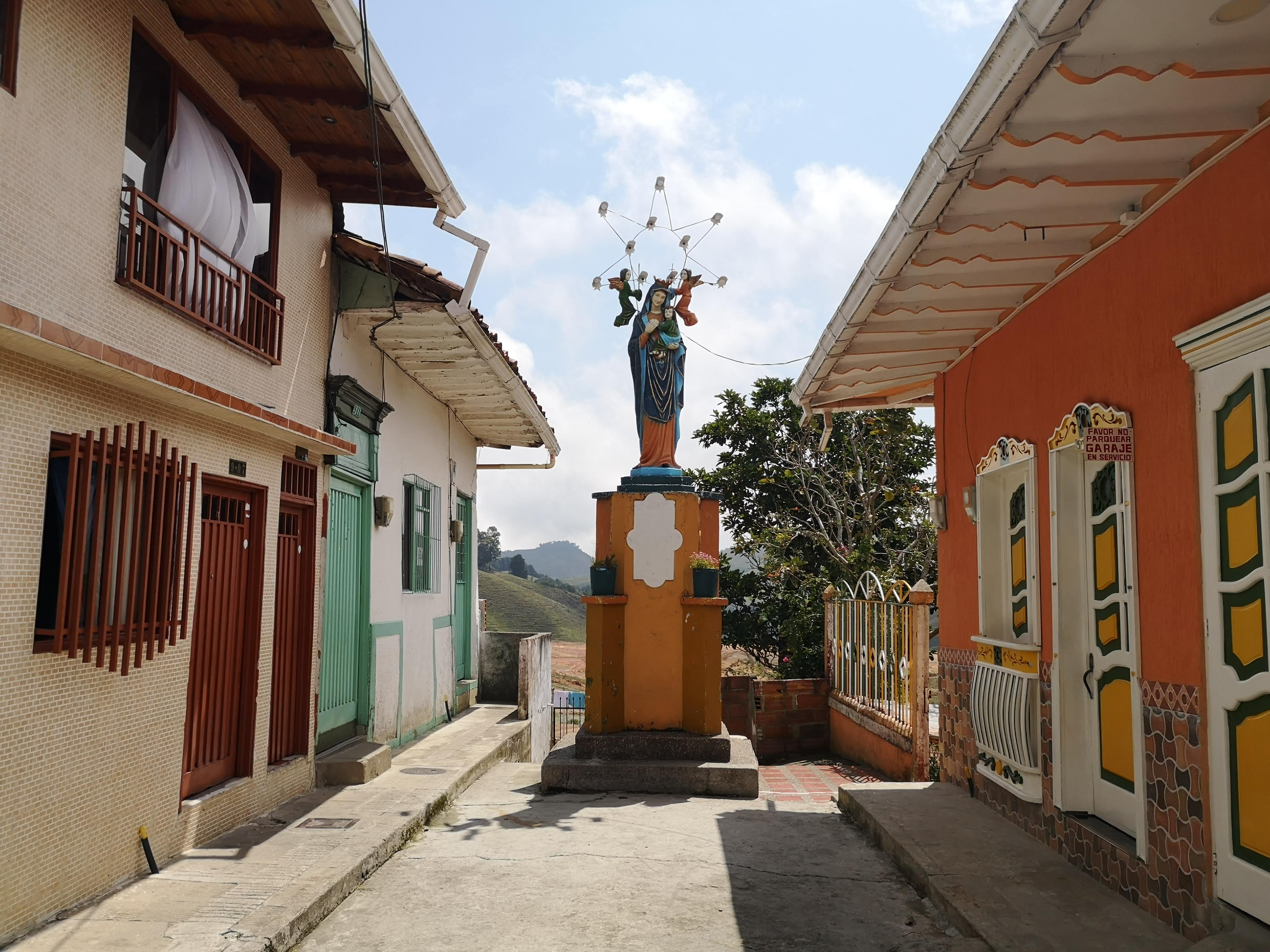
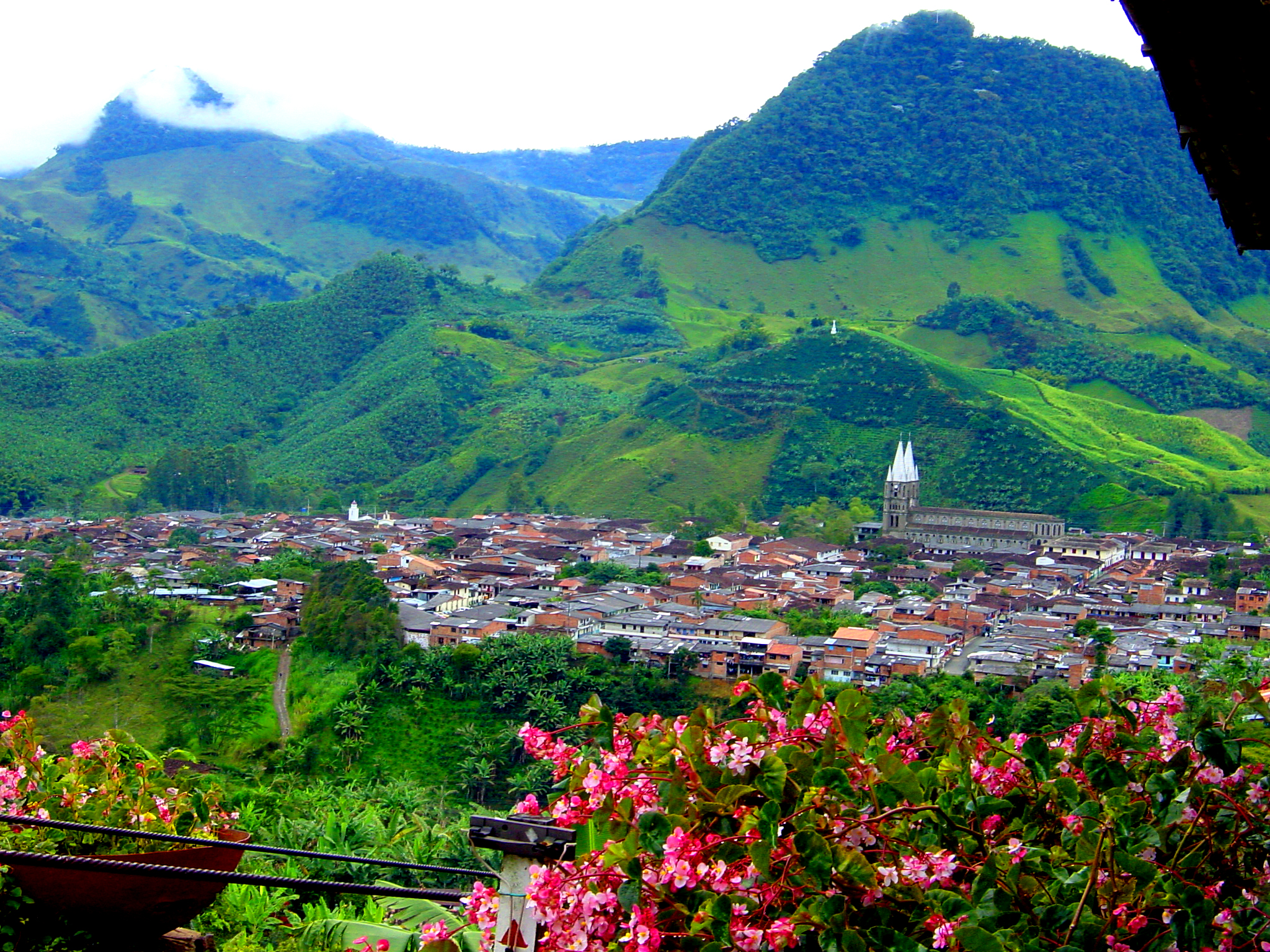
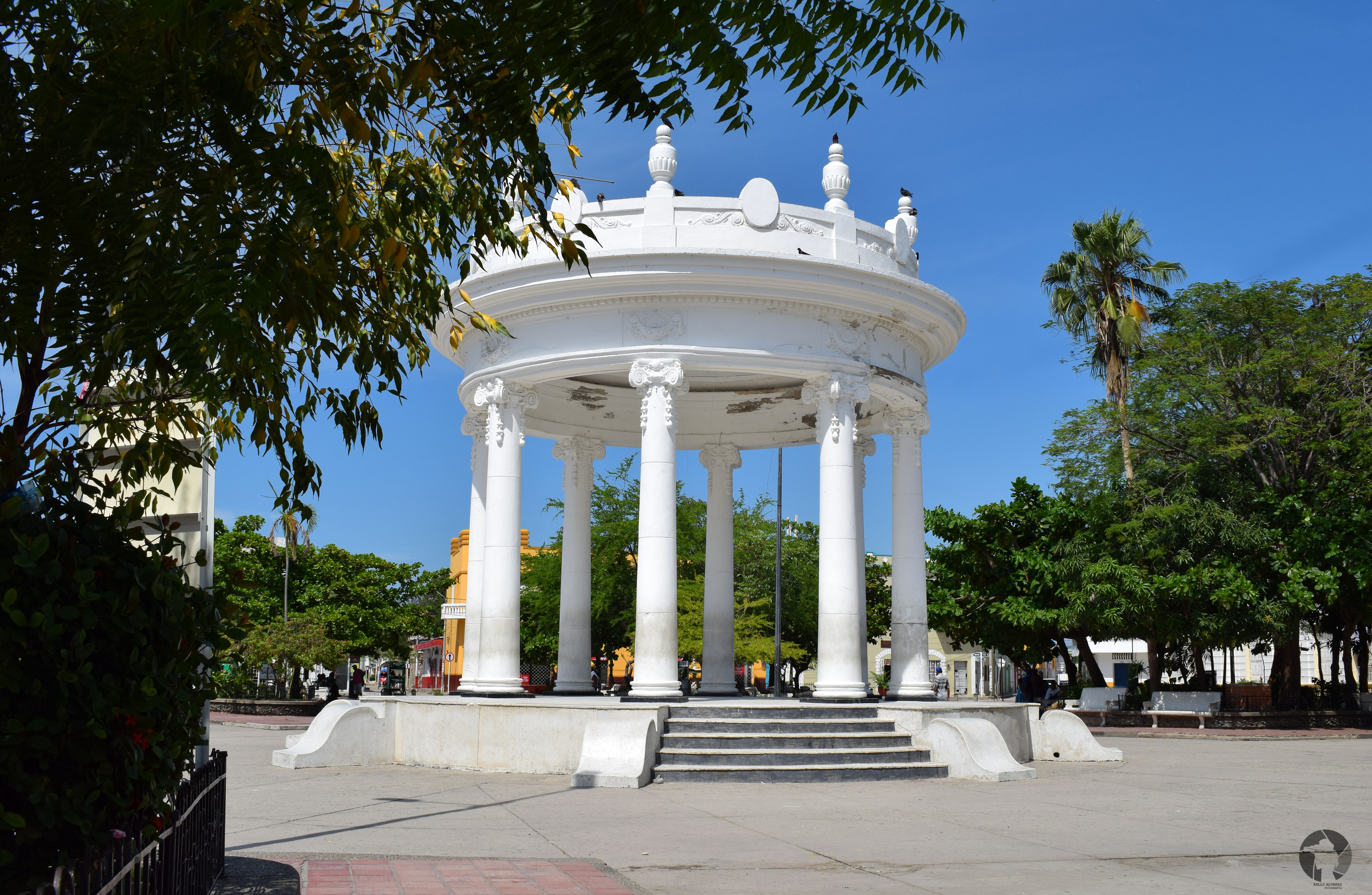
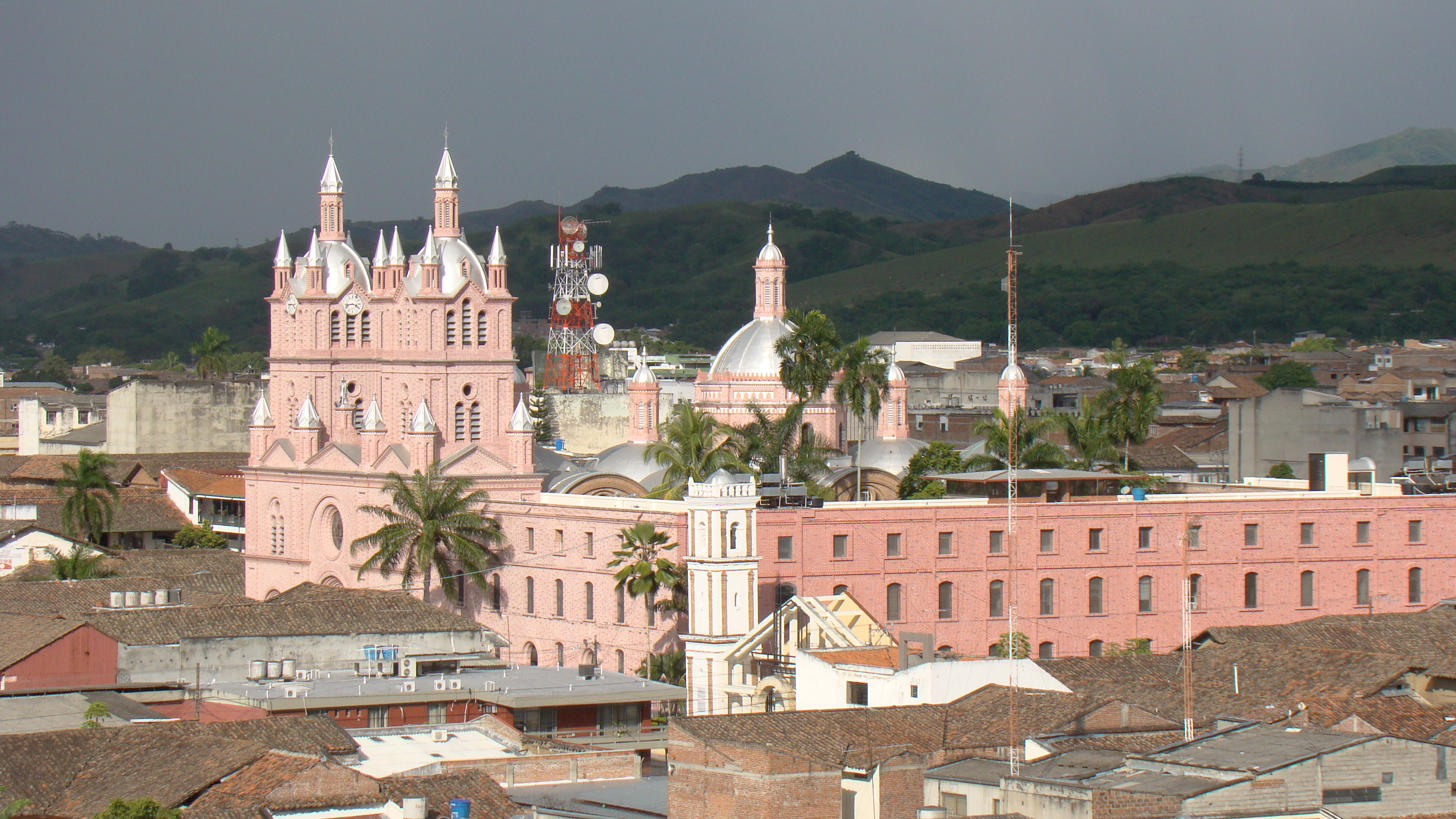
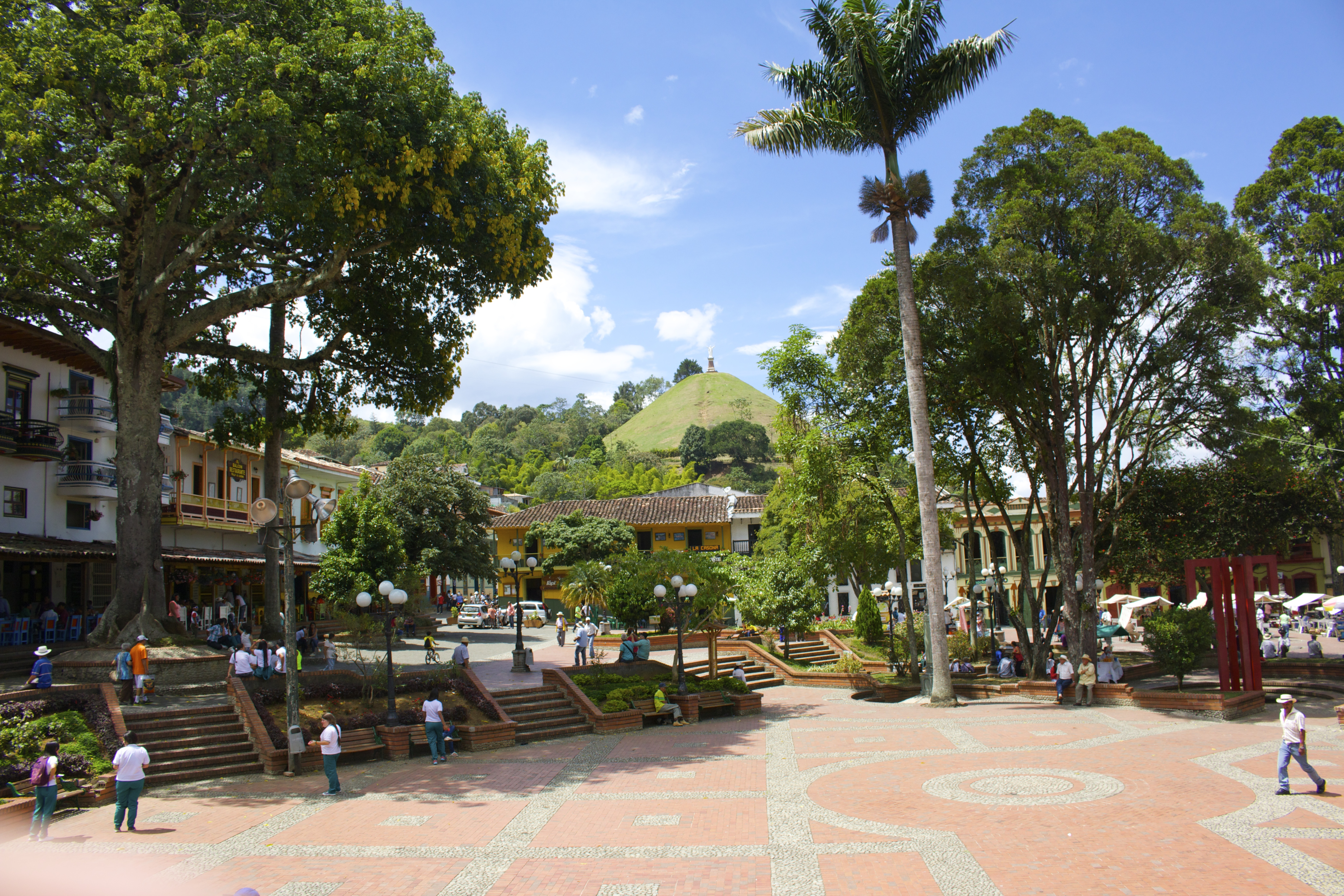
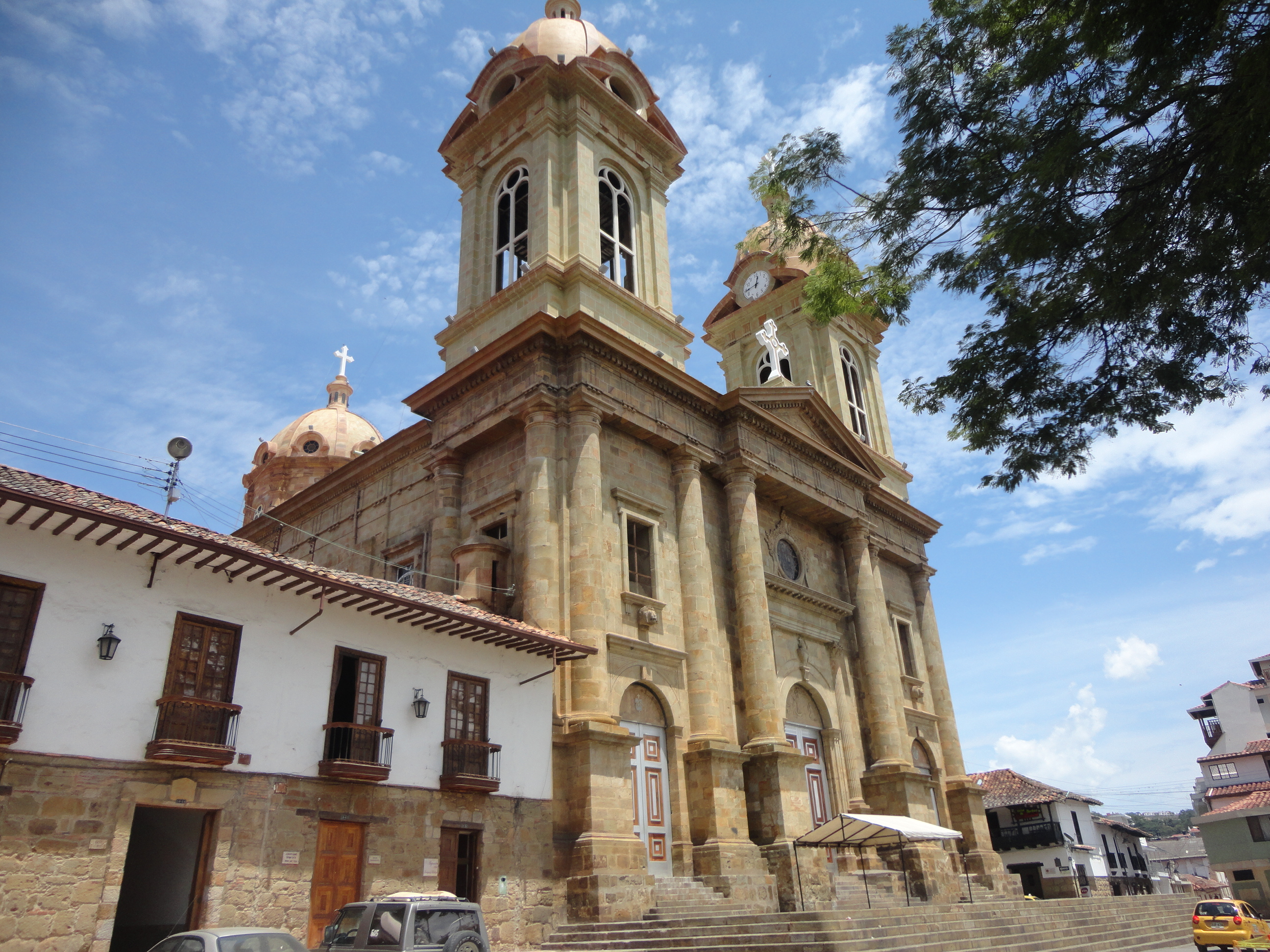
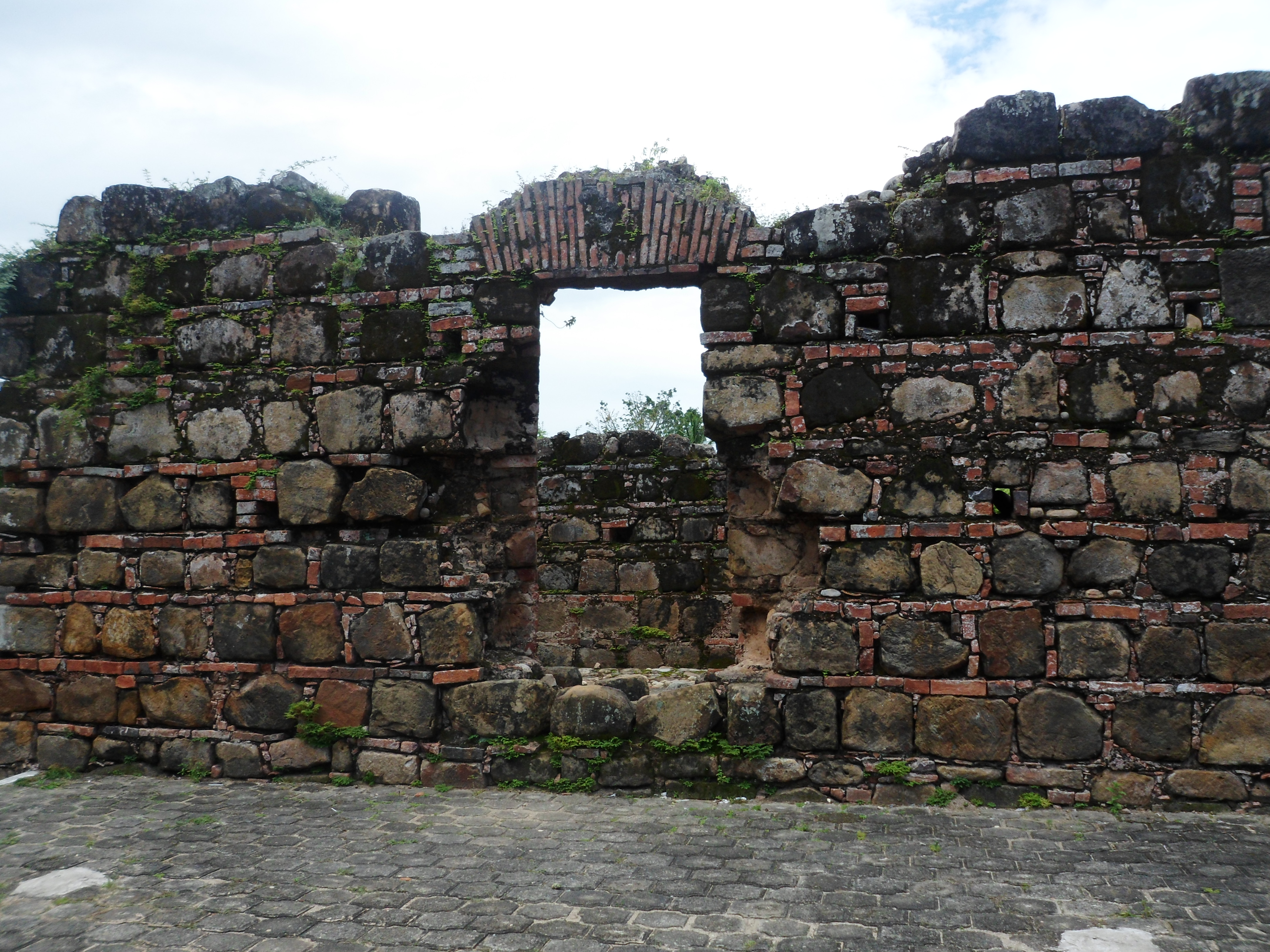
#	Image	Town	Department	Region	Founded	Named Pueblo Patrimonio
1		Barichara	Santander	Zona Santanderes	1705	2010
2		Girón	Santander	Zona Santanderes	1631	2010
3		Guaduas	Cundinamarca	Zona Central-Cundiboyacense	1572	2010
4		Honda	Tolima	Zona Central-Cundiboyacense	1539	2010
5		Lorica	Córdoba	Zona Caribe	1740	2010
6		Mompox	Bolívar	Zona Caribe	1537	2010
7		Monguí	Boyacá	Zona Central-Cundiboyacense	1601	2010
8		Playa de Belén	Norte de Santander	Zona Santanderes	1862	2010
9		Salamina	Caldas	Zona Cafetera y Paisa	1825	2010
10		Santa Fe de Antioquia	Antioquia	Zona Cafetera y Paisa	1541	2010
11		Villa de Leyva	Boyacá	Zona Central-Cundiboyacense	1572	2010
12		Aguadas	Caldas	Zona Cafetera y Paisa	1808	2012
13		Jardín	Antioquia	Zona Cafetera y Paisa	1864	2012
14		Ciénaga	Magdalena	Zona Caribe	1521	2012
15		Buga	Valle del Cauca	Zona Pacífico	1573	2013
16		Jericó	Antioquia	Zona Cafetera y Paisa	1850	2013
17		Socorro	Santander	Zona Santanderes	1683	2014
18		Pore	Casanare	Zona Llanos Orientales	1644	2021

== Potential Additions to the Pueblos Patrimonio Network ==
In addition to the 18 municipalities that have been accepted into the network to date, several other Colombian towns are actively seeking the Pueblo Patrimonio designation:

Image	Town	Department	Region	Founded	Citation
	Filandia	Quindío	Zona Cafetera y Paisa	1878	
	Colosó	Sucre	Zona Caribe	1770	

== See also ==
- Pueblos Mágicos (Mexico)
- Pueblos Mágicos (Ecuador)
- Pueblos Pintorescos (Guatemala)
