= San Pedro, Sucre =

Coordinates: 8.73333°N 74.7167°W

- Municipality and town
- Flag

- Location of the municipality and town of San Pedro, Sucre in the Sucre Department of Colombia.
- Country: Colombia
- Department: Sucre Department

Area
  - Total: 222 km^{2} (86 sq mi)

Population (Census 2018)
  - Total: 18,029
  - Density: 81.2/km^{2} (210/sq mi)
- Time zone: UTC-5 (Colombia Standard Time)

San Pedro (Spanish pronunciation: [sam ˈpeðɾo]) is a town and municipality located in the Sucre Department, northern Colombia.

The original town was developed in 1684 by settlers from Sincé, Pileta, Corozal, Betulia, Sincelejo, Ovejas, El Salado, El Carmen de Bolívar, Tacamocho, Magangue, Cascajal and Buenavista.
