= Chalan =

Chalan or Chalán may refer to:

- Chalan (music), the development of a raga in Hindustani classical music
- Chalán, a municipality in Colombia
- Chalan, alternate name of Chelan, Lorestan, a village in Iran
- Chalan Beel, a wetland in Bangladesh
- Challan, any official form or other kind of document or piece of paperwork, citation, receipt for payment etc.
