= Caimito =

Caimito may refer to:

- Caimito or Chrysophyllum cainito, a tropical fruit also known as star apple
- Caimito, Sucre, a town in Colombia
- Caimito, Cuba, a town in Artemisa Province (before 2011 in Havana Province)
- Caimito, Panama
- Caimito, San Juan, Puerto Rico, a barrio
- Caimito, Juncos, Puerto Rico, a barrio
- Caimito, Yauco, Puerto Rico, a barrio
