= La Unión Municipality =

La Unión Municipality may refer to:

Colombia

- La Unión, Antioquia
- La Unión, Nariño
- La Unión, Sucre
- La Unión, Valle del Cauca

El Salvador

- La Unión, El Salvador

Honduras

- La Unión, Copán
- La Unión, Olancho
