= El Carmen de Bolívar =

- Municipality and town
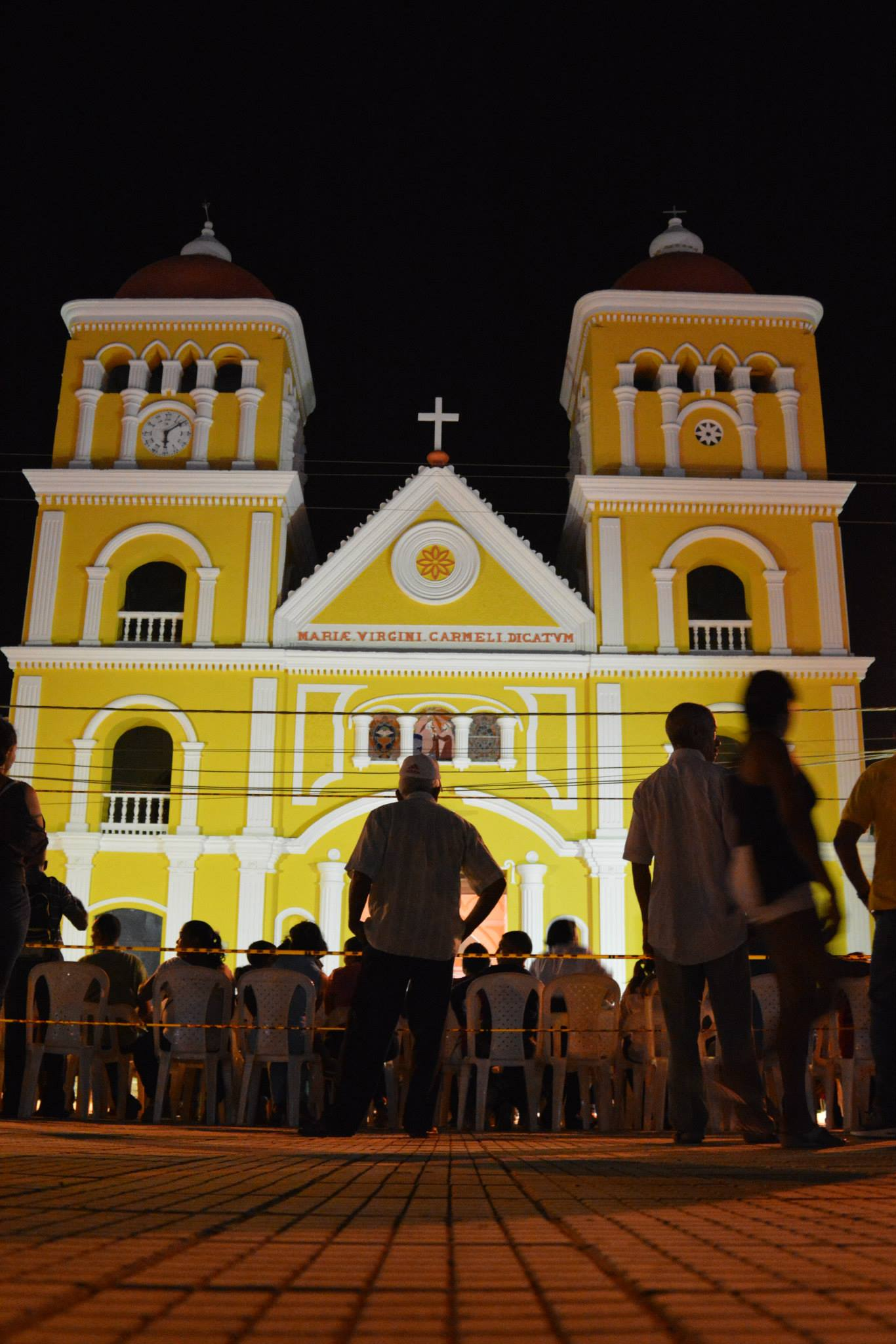

- Flag Coat of arms

- Location of the municipality and town of El Carmen de Bolívar in the Bolívar Department of Colombia

- Location in Colombia
- Coordinates: 9°43′N 75°08′W
- Country: Colombia
- Department: Bolívar Department
- Founded: 1776

Area
  - Municipality and town: 946.3 km^{2} (365.4 sq mi)
  - Urban: 5.36 km^{2} (2.07 sq mi)
- Elevation: 197 m (646 ft)

Population (2018 census)
  - Municipality and town: 70,131
  - Density: 74.11/km^{2} (191.9/sq mi)
  - Urban: 50,844
  - Urban density: 9,490/km^{2} (24,600/sq mi)
- Demonym: Carmero
- Area code: 605
- Website: Official website (in Spanish)

El Carmen de Bolívar is a municipality in the department of Bolívar, Colombia, 114 km southeast of Cartagena de Indias. It is located in the orographic system of the Montes de María, being the largest population, as well as the one that concentrates the economic and commercial movement of the subregion. It is the third most populated municipality in the department and an important agricultural center, considered "the agricultural and food pantry of the department of Bolívar" for being a great supplier to the entire department of products, especially avocado, tobacco, cocoa, banana, yam and sesame. This is how it is known as the Sweet City of Colombia since a part of its economy is based on food processing such as Chepacorinas Cookies, Coco Casadilla, Panochas, among others.

As for transport infrastructure, its geographically privileged position makes it conducive to the construction of a dry port. Since it connects the Colombian Caribbean with the Santanderes through the Ruta del Sol, it is also a key point of connection of the west of the country to the large ports of Barranquilla and Cartagena by the Troncal de Occidente; and through the Transversal Montes de María communicates this important national road artery with the Gulf of Morrosquillo.

During the time of Independence, the municipality distinguished itself by the support of its inhabitants to the liberating cause led by Colonel Manuel Cortés Campomanes, which earned her the time to be erected in a village in 1812. In the second half of the nineteenth century it acquired strategic and economic importance at the start of trade in agricultural producers such as tobacco and coffee through the Port of Jesus del Río, on the Magdalena River towards Barranquilla, which allowed it to become one of the main export centers of the country until the first half of the twentieth century.

== History ==
This area was initially inhabited by the Native American tribes of Malibúes, Farotos and Piletas, and was later conquered and colonized by the Spanish naming it sitio de Nuestra Señora del Carmen or "Our Lady of El Carmen site" in 1776 by a Spanish officer named Antonio de La Torre y Miranda, under the orders of Juan de Torrezal Díaz de Pimienta, Governor of Cartagena of Indies.

== Geography ==
The municipality of El Carmen de Bolivar is located south of the municipality of San Jacinto, north of the municipality of Ovejas, Sucre, west of the municipalities of Zambrano and Córdoba, and east of the municipality of San Onofre, Sucre, covering a total area of 954 km^{2}.

== Climate ==
Climate data for El Carmen de Bolívar (Carmen de Bolivar), elevation 152 m (499 ft), (1981–2010)
Month	Jan	Feb	Mar	Apr	May	Jun	Jul	Aug	Sep	Oct	Nov	Dec	Year
Mean daily maximum °C (°F)	34.2 (93.6)	35.0 (95.0)	35.0 (95.0)	34.1 (93.4)	32.8 (91.0)	32.9 (91.2)	33.7 (92.7)	33.4 (92.1)	32.3 (90.1)	31.7 (89.1)	32.0 (89.6)	33.0 (91.4)	33.4 (92.1)
Daily mean °C (°F)	27.2 (81.0)	27.8 (82.0)	28.1 (82.6)	28.0 (82.4)	27.6 (81.7)	27.7 (81.9)	27.8 (82.0)	27.5 (81.5)	26.9 (80.4)	26.5 (79.7)	26.6 (79.9)	26.9 (80.4)	27.4 (81.3)
Mean daily minimum °C (°F)	19.7 (67.5)	20.2 (68.4)	21.3 (70.3)	22.4 (72.3)	22.7 (72.9)	22.5 (72.5)	22.3 (72.1)	22.3 (72.1)	22.2 (72.0)	21.9 (71.4)	21.6 (70.9)	20.3 (68.5)	21.7 (71.1)
Average precipitation mm (inches)	23.6 (0.93)	34.6 (1.36)	60.4 (2.38)	120.2 (4.73)	127.3 (5.01)	109.4 (4.31)	95.2 (3.75)	119.7 (4.71)	146.9 (5.78)	135.6 (5.34)	93.6 (3.69)	39.1 (1.54)	1,105.4 (43.52)
Average precipitation days (≥ 1.0 mm)	3	4	6	10	13	11	10	12	12	14	9	4	105
Average relative humidity (%)	73	71	72	74	77	76	75	76	79	80	79	76	76
Mean monthly sunshine hours	235.6	203.3	186.0	156.0	148.8	162.0	201.5	179.8	138.0	142.6	162.0	192.2	2,107.8
Mean daily sunshine hours	7.6	7.2	6.0	5.2	4.8	5.4	6.5	5.8	4.6	4.6	5.4	6.2	5.8
Source: Instituto de Hidrologia Meteorologia y Estudios Ambientales
