= Sampués =

Coordinates: 9°11′N 75°23′W

- Municipality
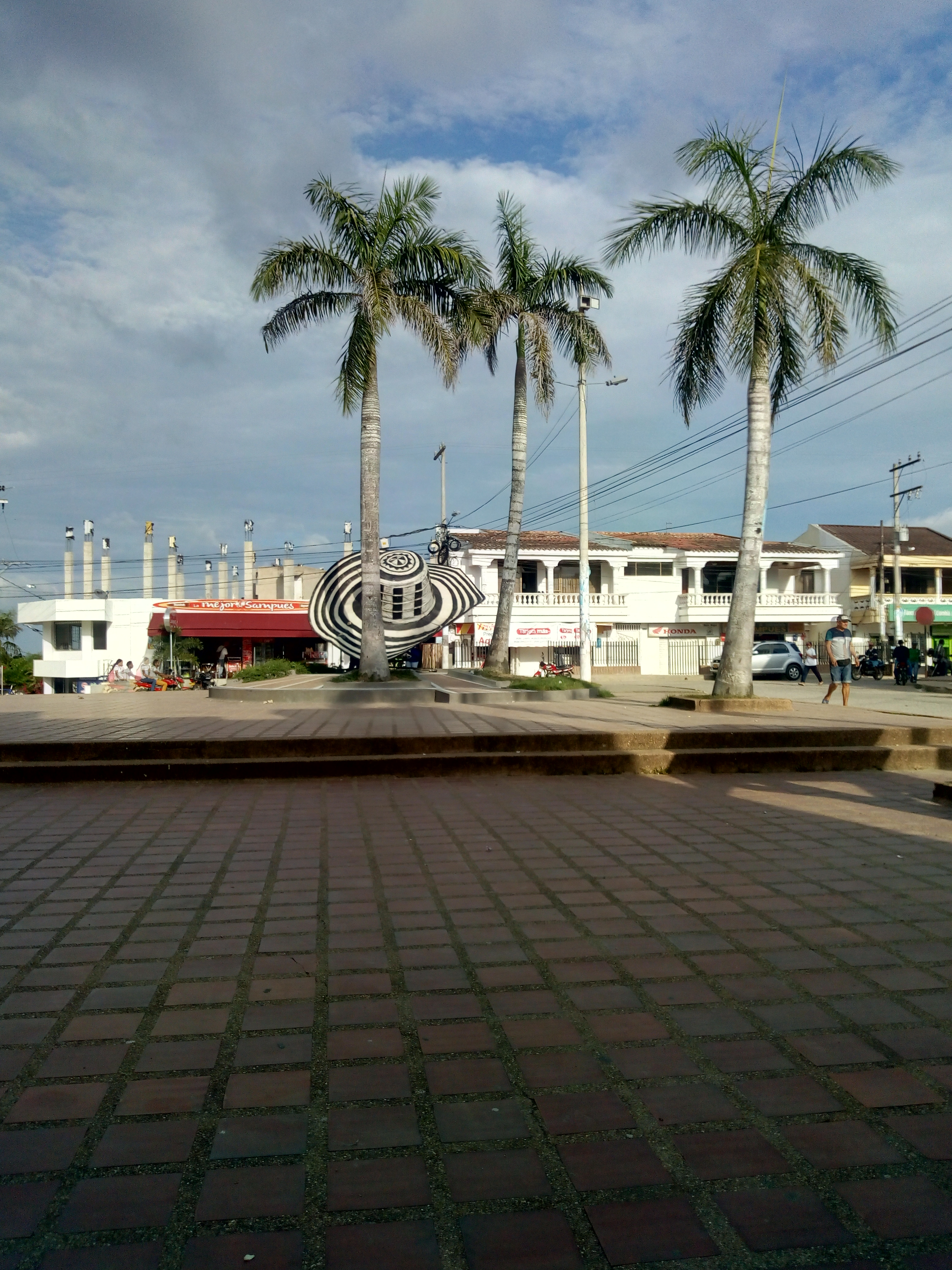

- Flag

- Location of the municipality and town of Sampués in the Sucre Department of Colombia.
- Country: Colombia
- Department: Sucre Department

Area
  - Land: 213.9 km^{2} (82.6 sq mi)
  - Urban: 2.79 km^{2} (1.08 sq mi)

Population (2020 est.)
  - Municipality: 48,819
  - Density: 228.2/km^{2} (591.1/sq mi)
  - Urban: 24,511
  - Urban density: 8,790/km^{2} (22,800/sq mi)
- Time zone: UTC-5 (Colombia Standard Time)
- Website: www.sampues-sucre.gov.co (in Spanish)

Sampués (Spanish pronunciation: [sampuˈes]) is a town and municipality located in the Sucre Department, northern Colombia.

== Climate ==
Climate data for Sampués (Univ de Sucre), elevation 160 m (520 ft), (1981–2010)
Month	Jan	Feb	Mar	Apr	May	Jun	Jul	Aug	Sep	Oct	Nov	Dec	Year
Mean daily maximum °C (°F)	33.3 (91.9)	33.9 (93.0)	33.8 (92.8)	33.1 (91.6)	31.8 (89.2)	31.7 (89.1)	31.9 (89.4)	31.9 (89.4)	31.3 (88.3)	30.9 (87.6)	31.1 (88.0)	32.0 (89.6)	32.2 (90.0)
Daily mean °C (°F)	26.8 (80.2)	27.1 (80.8)	27.2 (81.0)	27.4 (81.3)	27.0 (80.6)	27.1 (80.8)	27.1 (80.8)	26.9 (80.4)	26.5 (79.7)	26.3 (79.3)	26.4 (79.5)	26.7 (80.1)	26.9 (80.4)
Mean daily minimum °C (°F)	22.3 (72.1)	22.4 (72.3)	22.9 (73.2)	23.2 (73.8)	23.3 (73.9)	23.1 (73.6)	22.8 (73.0)	22.5 (72.5)	22.8 (73.0)	22.8 (73.0)	22.8 (73.0)	22.5 (72.5)	22.7 (72.9)
Average precipitation mm (inches)	19.4 (0.76)	34.8 (1.37)	39.3 (1.55)	116.8 (4.60)	166.9 (6.57)	151.3 (5.96)	133.1 (5.24)	169.8 (6.69)	187.6 (7.39)	132.5 (5.22)	106.7 (4.20)	45.3 (1.78)	1,303.6 (51.32)
Average precipitation days	3	4	5	9	14	14	13	15	14	13	11	5	118
Average relative humidity (%)	78	76	77	79	83	83	82	83	84	85	84	81	81
Mean monthly sunshine hours	226.3	192.0	176.7	144.0	136.4	165.0	186.0	170.5	141.0	142.6	147.0	189.1	2,016.6
Mean daily sunshine hours	7.3	6.8	5.7	4.8	4.4	5.5	6.0	5.5	4.7	4.6	4.9	6.1	5.5
Source: Instituto de Hidrologia Meteorologia y Estudios Ambientales
