= Guaranda, Sucre =

Coordinates: 8°28′N 75°32′W

- Municipality and town
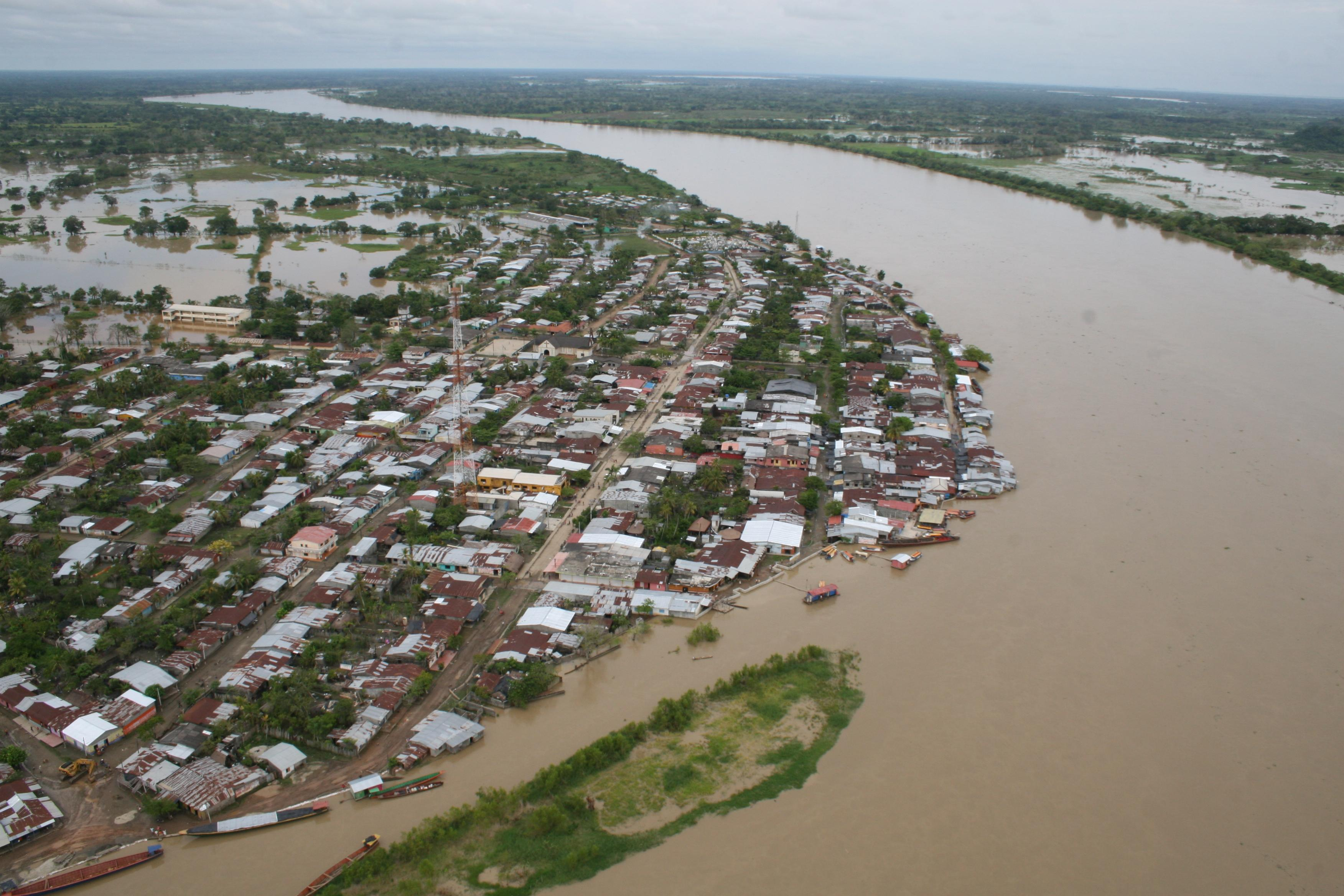
- View of Guaranda

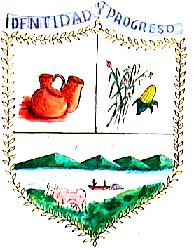
- Flag Coat of arms

- Location of the municipality and town of Guaranda, Sucre in the Sucre Department of Colombia.
- Country: Colombia
- Department: Sucre Department

Area
  - Total: 354 km^{2} (137 sq mi)

Population (Census 2018)
  - Total: 15,618
  - Density: 44.1/km^{2} (114/sq mi)
- Time zone: UTC-5 (Colombia Standard Time)

Guaranda is a town and municipality located in the Sucre Department, northern Colombia.

== Climate ==
Guaranda has a tropical monsoon climate (Am) with heavy rainfall in all months except January.

Climate data for Guaranda
Month	Jan	Feb	Mar	Apr	May	Jun	Jul	Aug	Sep	Oct	Nov	Dec	Year
Mean daily maximum °C (°F)	32.5 (90.5)	33.2 (91.8)	33.3 (91.9)	33.1 (91.6)	32.1 (89.8)	32.0 (89.6)	32.2 (90.0)	32.0 (89.6)	31.7 (89.1)	31.4 (88.5)	31.6 (88.9)	32.0 (89.6)	32.3 (90.1)
Daily mean °C (°F)	27.7 (81.9)	28.1 (82.6)	28.5 (83.3)	28.5 (83.3)	27.8 (82.0)	27.9 (82.2)	27.7 (81.9)	27.7 (81.9)	27.3 (81.1)	27.2 (81.0)	27.6 (81.7)	27.6 (81.7)	27.8 (82.1)
Mean daily minimum °C (°F)	23.0 (73.4)	23.1 (73.6)	23.7 (74.7)	23.9 (75.0)	23.6 (74.5)	23.8 (74.8)	23.2 (73.8)	23.4 (74.1)	23.0 (73.4)	23.1 (73.6)	23.6 (74.5)	23.3 (73.9)	23.4 (74.1)
Average rainfall mm (inches)	0.8 (0.03)	70.8 (2.79)	100.5 (3.96)	230.2 (9.06)	444.6 (17.50)	446.7 (17.59)	482.8 (19.01)	439.3 (17.30)	374.7 (14.75)	440.9 (17.36)	295.6 (11.64)	159.7 (6.29)	3,486.6 (137.28)
Average rainy days	2	3	3	8	12	12	13	14	12	13	11	6	109
