= San Benito Abad =

Coordinates: 8°56′N 75°02′W

- Municipality and town
- Location of the municipality and town of San Benito Abad in the Sucre Department of Colombia.
- Country: Colombia
- Department: Sucre Department

Area
  - Land: 1,592 km^{2} (615 sq mi)
- Elevation: 20 m (66 ft)

Population (2015)
  - Municipality and town: 25,442
  - Urban: 5,314
- Demonym: Sanbenitino
- Time zone: UTC-5 (Colombia Standard Time)

San Benito Abad (Spanish pronunciation: [sam beˈnito aˈβað]) is a town and municipality located in the Sucre Department, northern Colombia.

== Climate ==
Climate data for San Benito Abad, elevation 20 m (66 ft), (1981–2010)
Month	Jan	Feb	Mar	Apr	May	Jun	Jul	Aug	Sep	Oct	Nov	Dec	Year
Mean daily maximum °C (°F)	32.5 (90.5)	33.3 (91.9)	33.8 (92.8)	33.7 (92.7)	32.6 (90.7)	32.5 (90.5)	32.2 (90.0)	32.0 (89.6)	31.9 (89.4)	31.5 (88.7)	31.6 (88.9)	32.1 (89.8)	32.4 (90.3)
Daily mean °C (°F)	28.0 (82.4)	28.4 (83.1)	28.7 (83.7)	28.6 (83.5)	28.3 (82.9)	28.2 (82.8)	28.2 (82.8)	28.1 (82.6)	27.9 (82.2)	27.8 (82.0)	27.9 (82.2)	27.9 (82.2)	28.2 (82.8)
Mean daily minimum °C (°F)	22.8 (73.0)	23.0 (73.4)	23.4 (74.1)	23.7 (74.7)	23.6 (74.5)	23.4 (74.1)	23.3 (73.9)	23.0 (73.4)	23.1 (73.6)	23.3 (73.9)	23.4 (74.1)	23.2 (73.8)	23.3 (73.9)
Average precipitation mm (inches)	13.5 (0.53)	14.7 (0.58)	30.3 (1.19)	114.7 (4.52)	191.8 (7.55)	227.2 (8.94)	241.7 (9.52)	252.3 (9.93)	256.7 (10.11)	216.0 (8.50)	147.1 (5.79)	50.7 (2.00)	1,718.4 (67.65)
Average precipitation days	1	2	3	7	13	14	15	15	15	15	11	4	113
Average relative humidity (%)	80	78	77	78	81	81	81	82	82	83	83	82	81
Mean monthly sunshine hours	254.2	217.4	192.2	171.0	161.2	189.0	217.0	210.8	171.0	179.8	180.0	223.2	2,366.8
Mean daily sunshine hours	8.2	7.7	6.2	5.7	5.2	6.3	7.0	6.8	5.7	5.8	6.0	7.2	6.5
Source: Instituto de Hidrologia Meteorologia y Estudios Ambientales
