= Galeras, Sucre =

Coordinates: 9°10′N 75°03′W

- Municipality and town
- Flag Coat of arms

- Location of the municipality and town of Galeras, Sucre in the Sucre Department of Colombia.
- Country: Colombia
- Department: Sucre Department

Government
  - Major: Francisco Ramirez Mejía

Area
  - Total: 326.1 km^{2} (125.9 sq mi)
- Elevation: 80 m (260 ft)

Population (Census 2018)
  - Total: 20,239
  - Density: 62.06/km^{2} (160.7/sq mi)
- Time zone: UTC-5 (Colombia Standard Time)
- Website: www.galeras-sucre.gov.co

Galeras is a town and municipality located in the Sucre Department, northern Colombia. The main economic activities are agriculture and cattle raising. Galeras is 50 km away from the department's capital, Sincelejo.

== Geography ==
=== Political division ===
Galera is a municipality formed by five "corregimientos": Puerto Franco, Baraya, San Andrés de Palomo, San José de Rivera, Pueblo Nuevo Junín., and seventeen "veredas":Pueblo Nuevo II, Surban, Abre el Ojo, Mata de Guasimo, Palmital, Bleo, San Pelayo, Los Leones, El Jacinto, La Corocera, San Luís, El Pantanito, El Guamo, Los Abetos, Caña Seca, Mancomojan, Campo Ameno.

== Culture ==
Every year in the year's first week its people enjoy the town's main party: El festival de la algarroba (The festival of algarroba). The Algarroba (Hymenaea courbaril (Caesalpinaceae)) is a tree that grows easily in Galeras.
