= San Juan Betulia =

Coordinates: 9.27556°N 75.2456°W

- Municipality and town
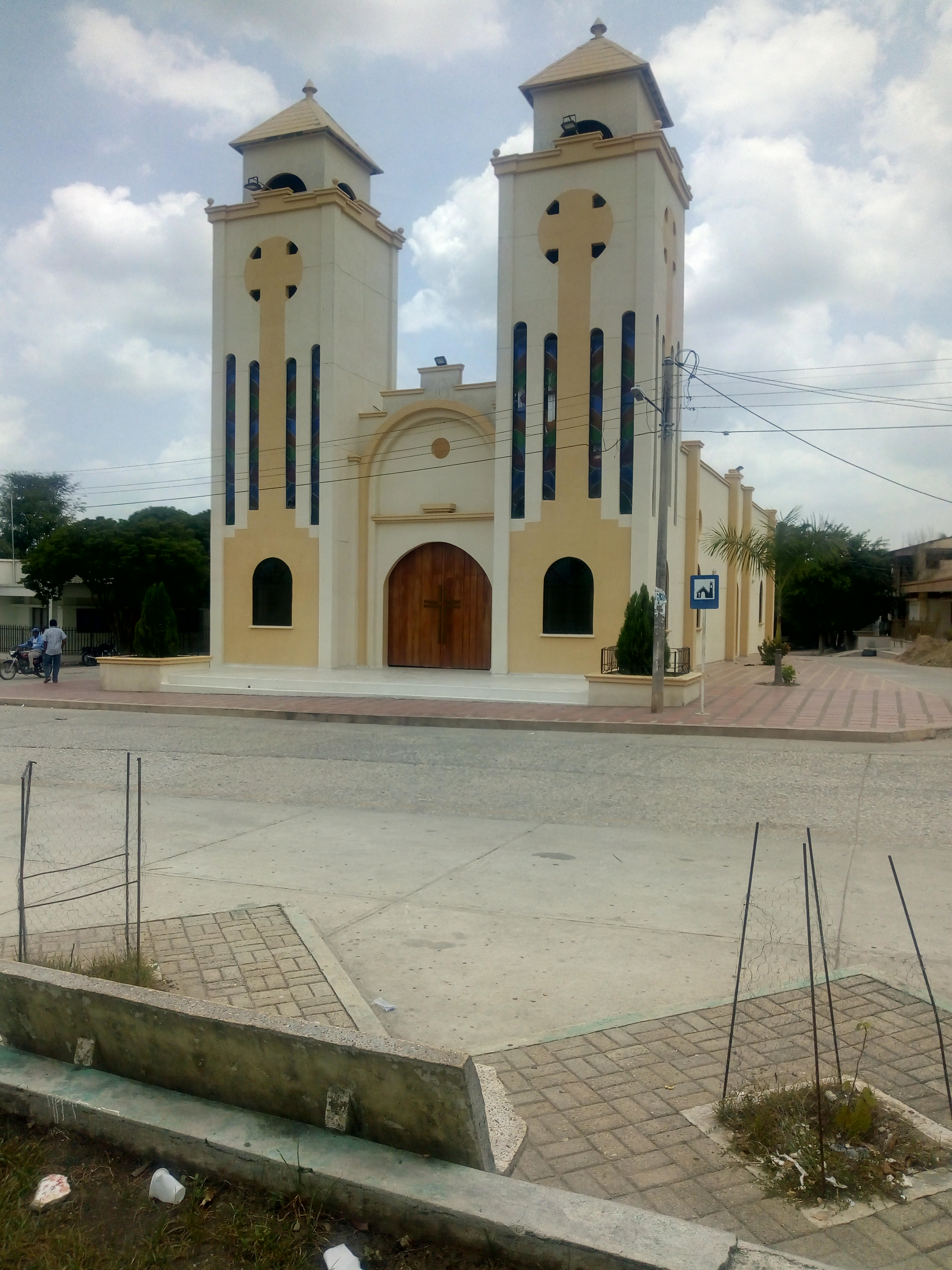

- Flag

- Location of the municipality and town of San Juan Betulia in the Sucre Department of Colombia.
- Country: Colombia
- Department: Sucre Department

Area
  - Total: 19 km^{2} (7.3 sq mi)

Population (Census 2018)
  - Total: 13,437
  - Density: 710/km^{2} (1,800/sq mi)
- Time zone: UTC-5 (Colombia Standard Time)

San Juan Betulia is a town and municipality located in the Sucre Department, northern Colombia.
