= Palmito, Sucre =

Coordinates: 9°20′N 75°33′W

- Municipality and town
- Flag

- Location of the municipality and town of Palmito, Sucre in the Sucre Department of Colombia.
- Country: Colombia
- Department: Sucre Department

Area
  - Municipality and town: 176 km^{2} (68 sq mi)
- Elevation: 3 m (9.8 ft)

Population (2015)
  - Municipality and town: 13,682
  - Density: 77.7/km^{2} (201/sq mi)
  - Urban: 5,345
- Time zone: UTC-5 (Colombia Standard Time)

Palmito, officially San Antonio de Palmito, is a town and municipality located in the Sucre Department, northern Colombia.
