= El Roble, Sucre =

Coordinates: 9.1°N 75.2°W

- Municipality and town
- Flag

- Location of the municipality and town of El Roble, Sucre in the Sucre Department of Colombia.
- Country: Colombia
- Department: Sucre Department

Population (Census 2018)
  - Total: 9,786
- Time zone: UTC-5 (Colombia Standard Time)

El Roble is a town and municipality located in the Sucre Department, northern Colombia.
