= Morroa =

Coordinates: 9°20′N 75°19′W

- Municipality and town
- Flag Coat of arms

- Location of the municipality and town of Morroa in the Sucre Department of Colombia.
- Country: Colombia
- Department: Sucre Department

Government
  - Mayor: Quicho Solano

Area
  - Total: 161 km^{2} (62 sq mi)
- Elevation: 156 m (512 ft)

Population (2015)
  - Total: 14,429
  - Density: 89.6/km^{2} (232/sq mi)
- Time zone: UTC-5 (Colombia Standard Time)
- Website: http://www.morroa-sucre.gov.co/

Morroa is a town and municipality located in the Sucre Department, northern Colombia.
