= Toluviejo =

Coordinates: 9°27′N 75°27′W

- Municipality and town
- Flag

- Location of the municipality and town of Toluviejo in the Sucre Department of Colombia.
- Country: Colombia
- Department: Sucre Department

Area
  - Total: 276.49 km^{2} (106.75 sq mi)
- Elevation: 2 m (6.6 ft)

Population (Census 2018)
  - Total: 20,033
  - Density: 72.455/km^{2} (187.66/sq mi)
- Time zone: UTC-5 (Colombia Standard Time)

Toluviejo is a town and municipality located in the Sucre Department, northern Colombia.
