= Caimito, Sucre =

Coordinates: 8°50′N 75°10′W

- Municipality and town
- San Juan de Caimito
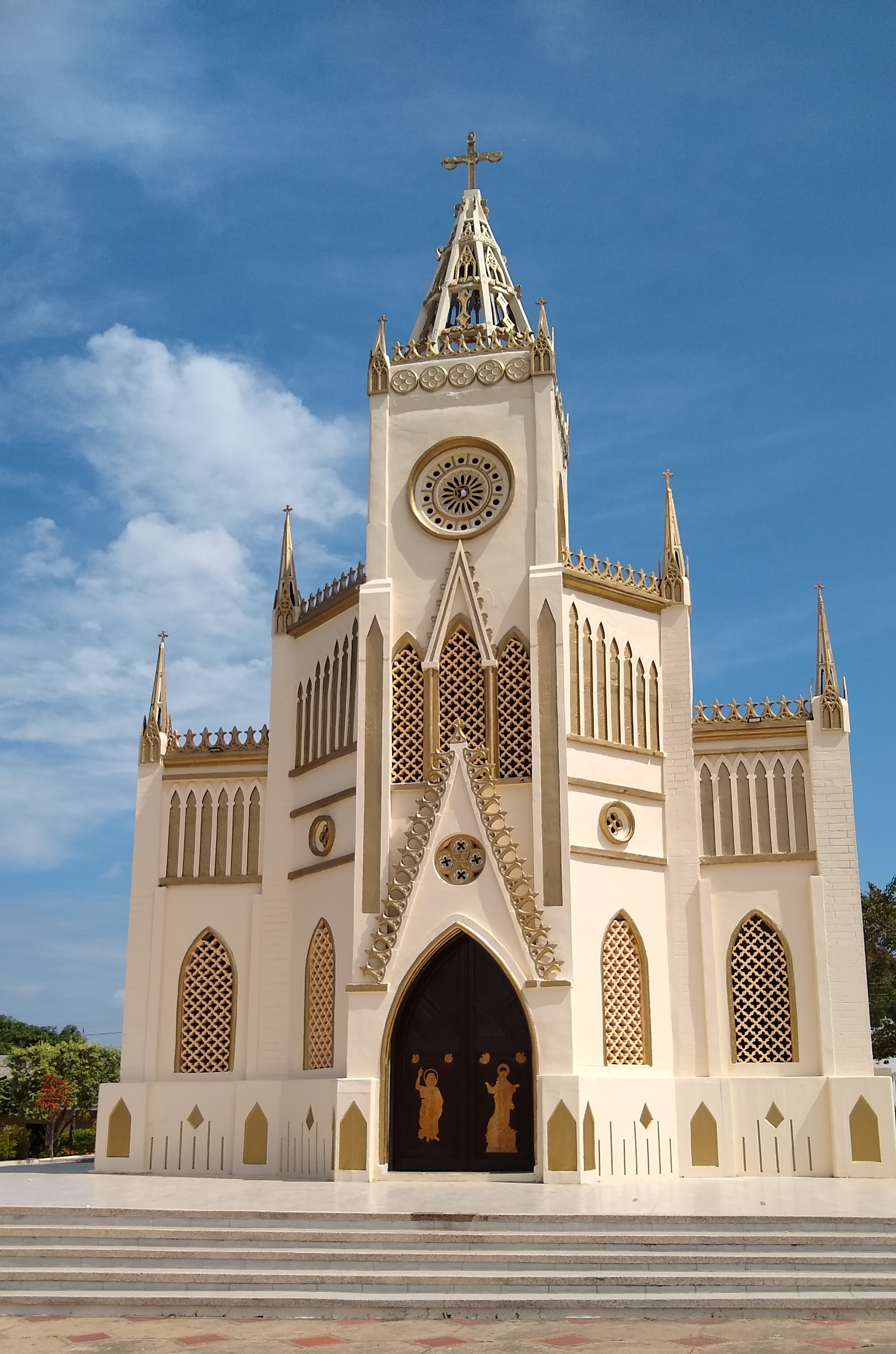
- Western facade of San Juan Bautista Church

- Flag
- Motto: Remanzo de Paz (In Spanish)
- Location of the municipality and town of Caimito, Sucre in the Sucre Department of Colombia.
- Country: Colombia
- Department: Sucre Department

Government
  - Mayor: Lucy Ester Buelvas Martínez (2024-2027)

Area
  - Total: 407 km^{2} (157 sq mi)

Population (Census 2023)
  - Total: 16,966
  - Density: 41.7/km^{2} (108/sq mi)
- Time zone: UTC-5 (Colombia Standard Time)

San Juan de Caimito, also known as Caimito. Is a town and municipality located in the Sucre Department, northern Colombia.

== Gallery ==
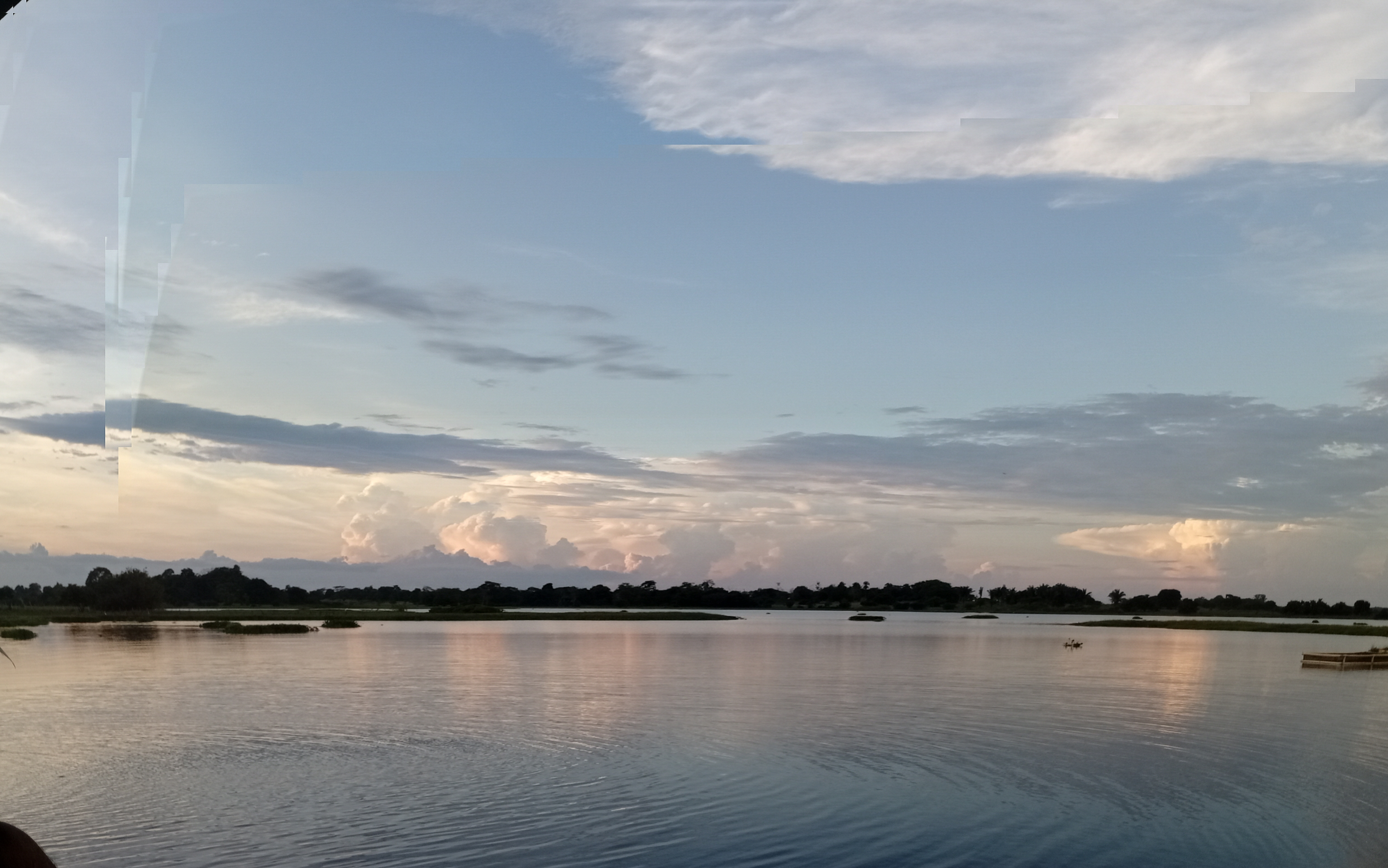
Panoramic View of La Cienaga de Caimito, at north of the Municipality Seat. Sucre, Colombia.

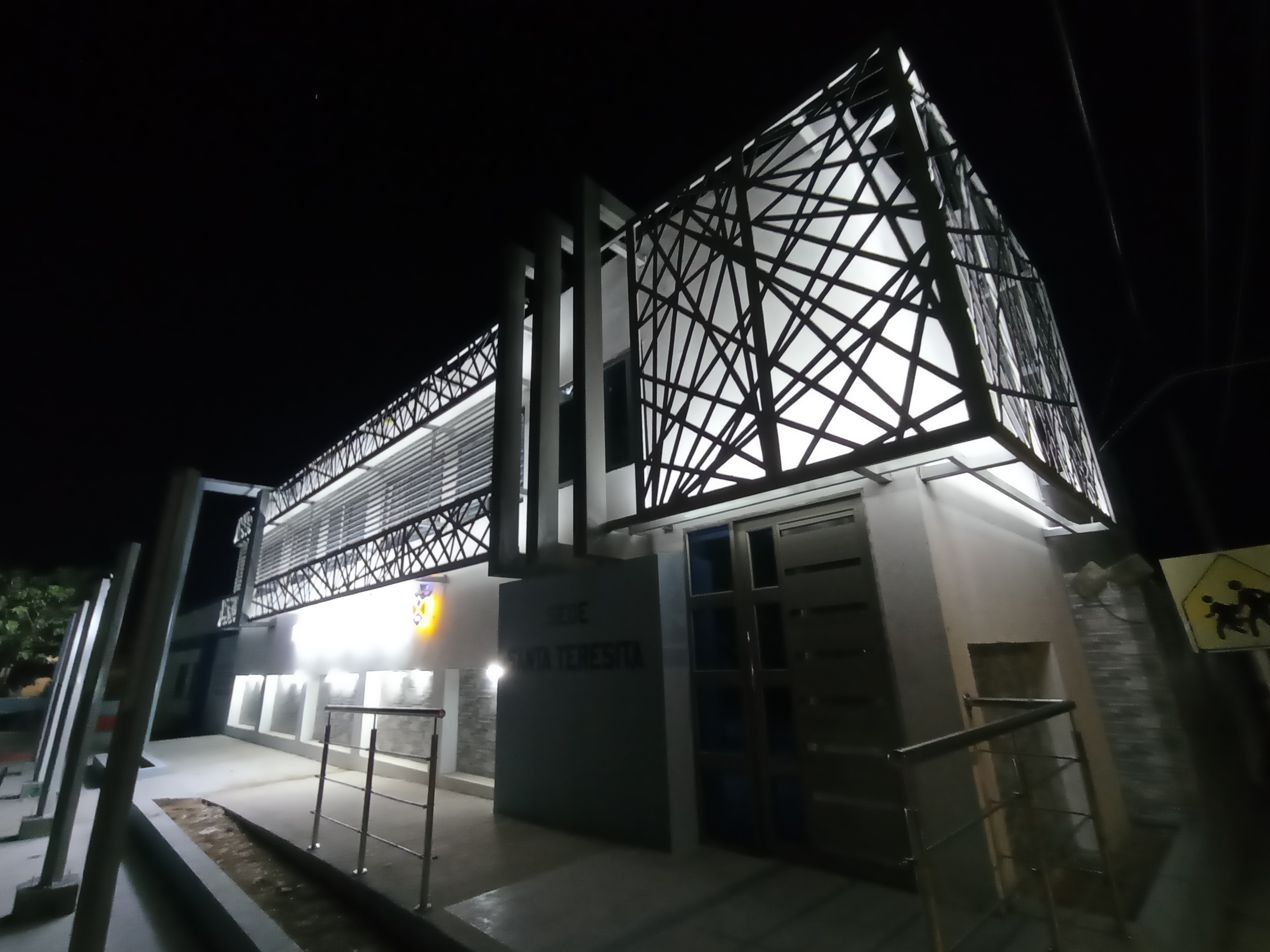
I.E San Juan Bautista. Santa Teresita´s Campus. Caimito, Sucre, Colombia

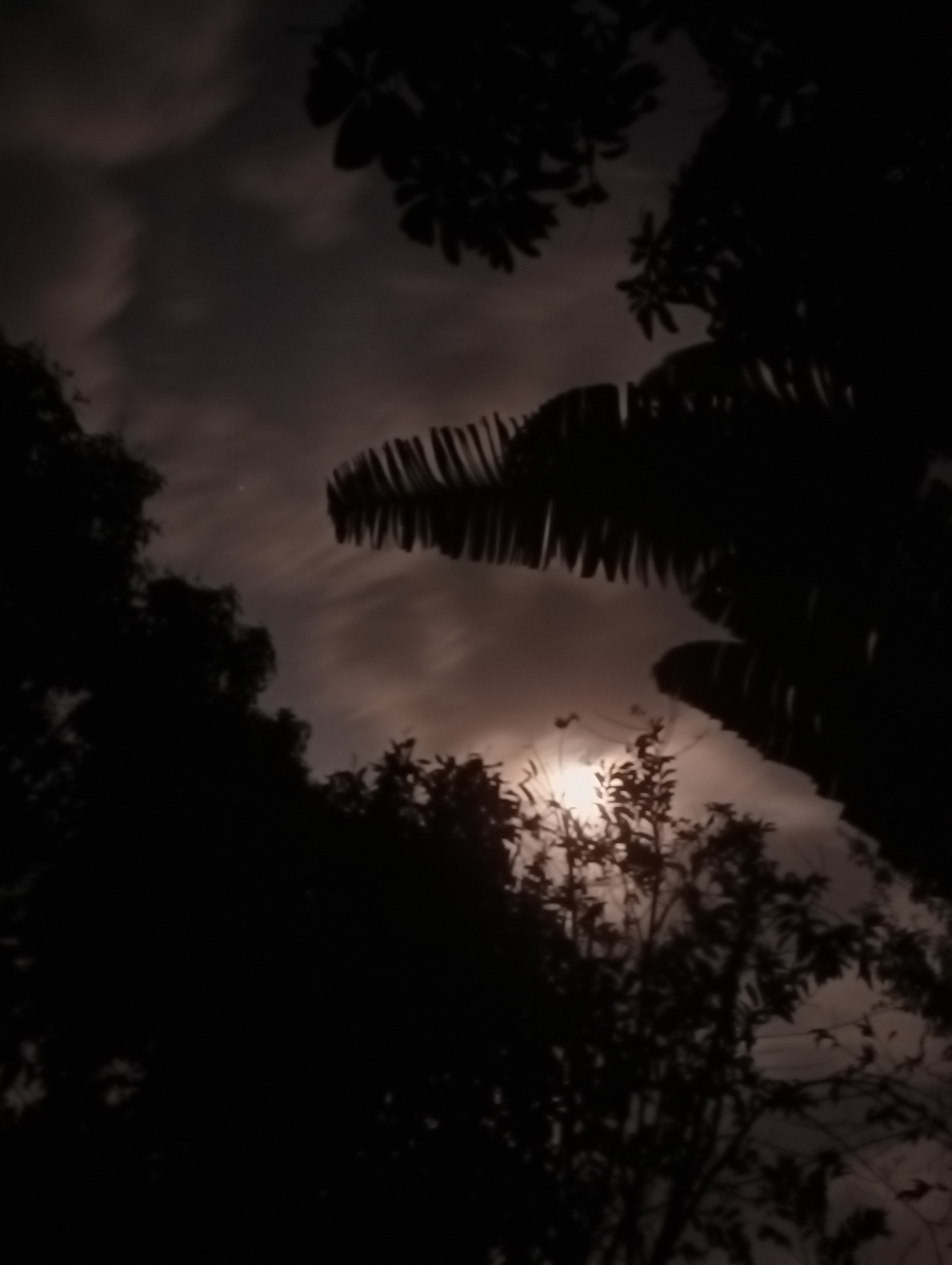
Long Exposure Photo Showing the Moon from Caimito, Sucre.

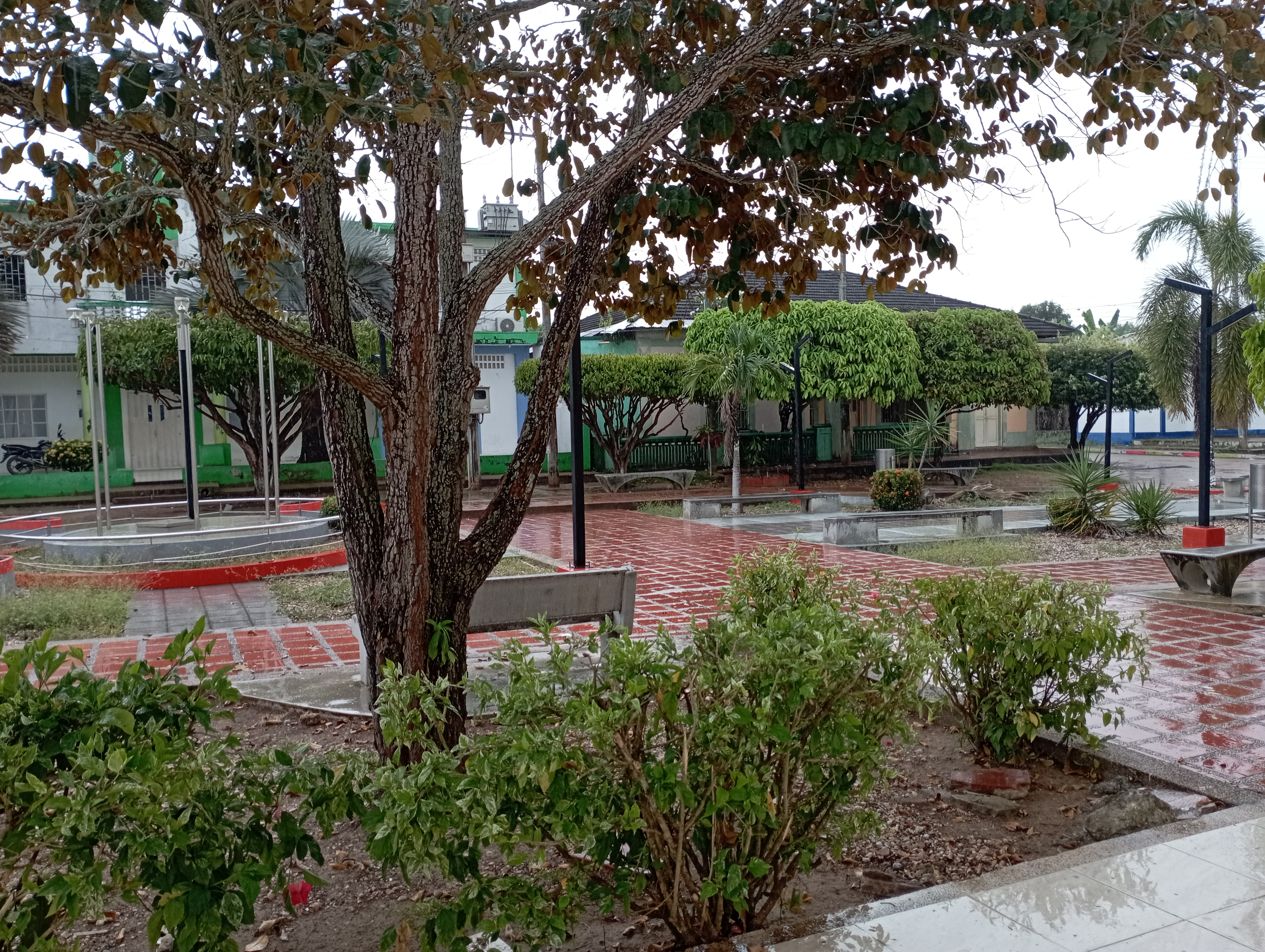
San Juan Bautista Church's South Park at rainy day.

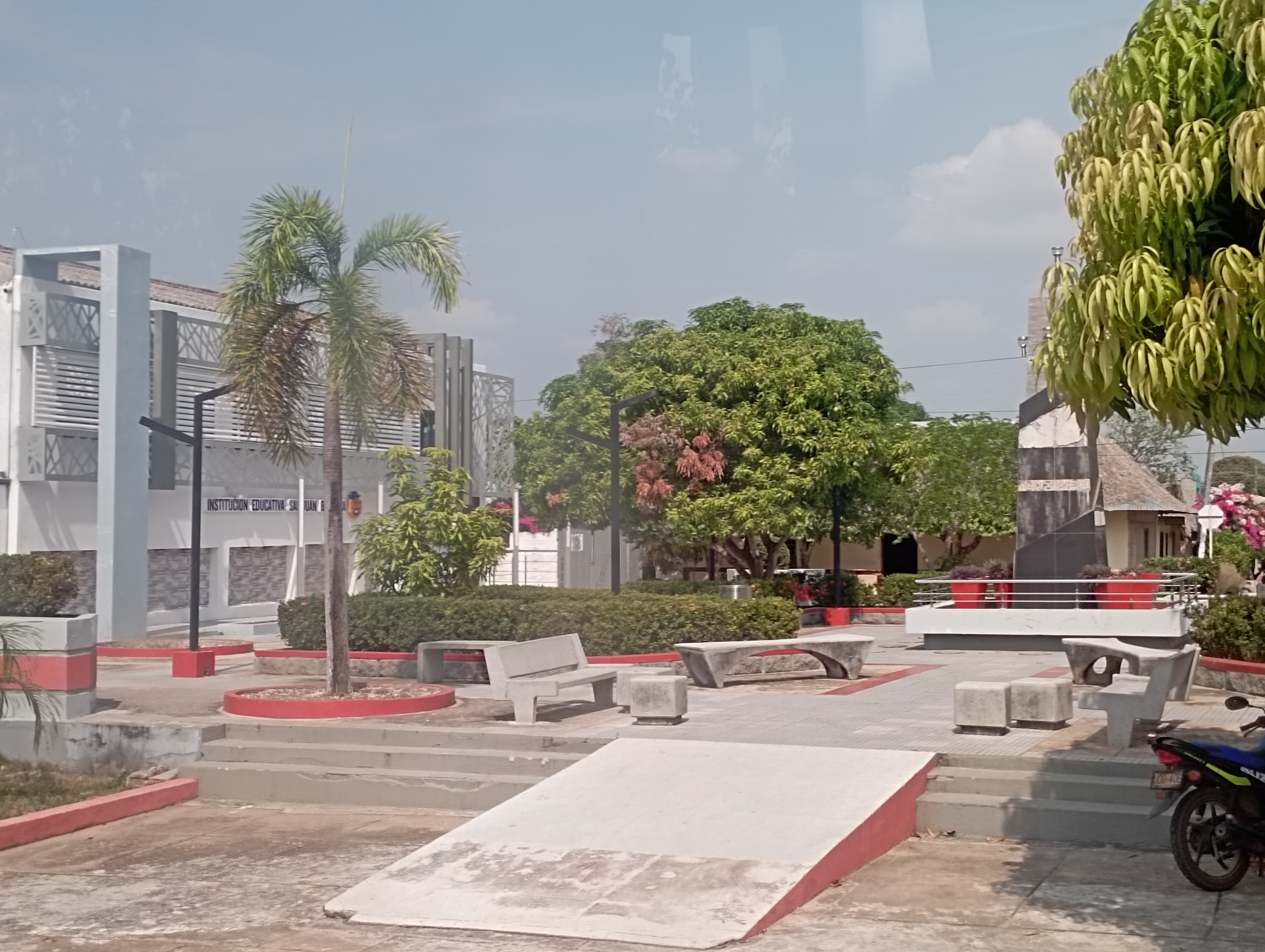
San Juan Bautista Church's North Park at sunny day
