= Buenavista, Sucre =

Buenavista
- Municipality
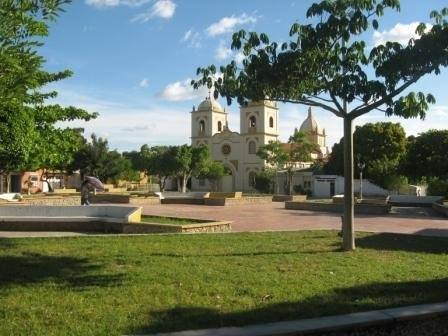
- View of Buenavista

- Flag Coat of arms

- Location within Colombia
- Coordinates: 9°19′13.6″N 74°58′24.2″W
- Country: Colombia
- Department: Sucre

Government
  - Mayor: José Nicolás Arrieta Guzmán

Area
  - Total: 146.5 km^{2} (56.6 sq mi)

Population (June 30, 2020)
  - Total: 10,829
  - Density: 73.92/km^{2} (191.5/sq mi)
- Time zone: UTC−05:00
- Area code(s): 70110
- Website: Official website

Buenavista is a municipality located in the Sucre Department, northern Colombia.
