= La Unión, Sucre =

Coordinates: 8.86056°N 75.2806°W

- Municipality and town
- Flag

- Location of the municipality and town of La Unión, Sucre in the Sucre Department of Colombia.
- Country: Colombia
- Department: Sucre Department

Area
  - Total: 224 km^{2} (86 sq mi)

Population (Census 2018)
  - Total: 11,510
  - Density: 51.4/km^{2} (133/sq mi)
- Time zone: UTC-5 (Colombia Standard Time)

La Unión is a town and municipality located in the Sucre Department, northern Colombia.
