= Los Palmitos =

Coordinates: 9.38111°N 75.2714°W

- Municipality and town
- Flag

- Location of the municipality and town of Los Palmitos in the Sucre Department of Colombia.
- Country: Colombia
- Department: Sucre Department

Population (Census 2018)
  - Total: 21,831
- Time zone: UTC-5 (Colombia Standard Time)

Los Palmitos is a town and municipality located in the Sucre Department, northern Colombia.
