= Chalán =

Coordinates: 9°33′N 75°19′W

- Municipality and town
- Coat of arms

- Location of the municipality and town of Chalán in the Sucre Department of Colombia.
- Country: Colombia
- Department: Sucre Department
- Time zone: UTC-5 (Colombia Standard Time)

Chalán is a town and municipality located in the Sucre Department, northern Colombia.
