= Colosó =

Coordinates: 9°30′N 75°21′W

- Municipality and town
- Location of the municipality and town of Colosó in the Sucre Department of Colombia.
- Country: Colombia
- Department: Sucre Department
- Time zone: UTC-5 (Colombia Standard Time)

Colosó is a town and municipality located in the Sucre Department, northern Colombia.

== Climate ==
Climate data for Colosó (Primates), elevation 200 m (660 ft), (1981–2010)
Month	Jan	Feb	Mar	Apr	May	Jun	Jul	Aug	Sep	Oct	Nov	Dec	Year
Mean daily maximum °C (°F)	33.4 (92.1)	33.7 (92.7)	33.7 (92.7)	33.2 (91.8)	32.1 (89.8)	32.1 (89.8)	32.4 (90.3)	32.3 (90.1)	31.5 (88.7)	30.9 (87.6)	31.1 (88.0)	32.2 (90.0)	32.4 (90.3)
Daily mean °C (°F)	27.0 (80.6)	27.4 (81.3)	27.4 (81.3)	27.3 (81.1)	27.0 (80.6)	27.0 (80.6)	27.0 (80.6)	26.9 (80.4)	26.6 (79.9)	26.4 (79.5)	26.4 (79.5)	26.6 (79.9)	26.9 (80.4)
Mean daily minimum °C (°F)	20.8 (69.4)	21.0 (69.8)	21.6 (70.9)	22.1 (71.8)	22.1 (71.8)	22.0 (71.6)	22.1 (71.8)	21.8 (71.2)	21.9 (71.4)	22.0 (71.6)	21.6 (70.9)	21.4 (70.5)	21.7 (71.1)
Average precipitation mm (inches)	17.1 (0.67)	11.1 (0.44)	37.2 (1.46)	89.0 (3.50)	173.7 (6.84)	147.3 (5.80)	131.4 (5.17)	145.6 (5.73)	136.1 (5.36)	153.7 (6.05)	119.9 (4.72)	48.1 (1.89)	1,186.7 (46.72)
Average precipitation days	2	3	4	10	13	12	12	13	12	13	11	5	108
Average relative humidity (%)	81	79	80	83	85	86	84	85	86	87	86	84	84
Mean monthly sunshine hours	179.8	177.8	186.0	138.0	120.9	129.0	151.9	139.5	132.0	127.1	126.0	148.8	1,756.8
Mean daily sunshine hours	5.8	6.3	6.0	4.6	3.9	4.3	4.9	4.5	4.4	4.1	4.2	4.8	4.8
Source: Instituto de Hidrologia Meteorologia y Estudios Ambientales
