= San Onofre, Sucre =

Coordinates: 9°44′N 75°32′W

- Municipality and town
- Flag

- Location of the municipality and town of San Onofre, Sucre in the Sucre Department of Colombia.
- Country: Colombia
- Department: Sucre Department

Population (2005)
  - Total: 46,383
- Time zone: UTC-5 (Colombia Standard Time)

San Onofre is a town and municipality located in the Sucre Department, northern Colombia.

== Notable people ==
- Dairo Esalas (born 1974), professional boxer
