= Sucre Department =

Department of Colombia

Sucre Department Departamento de Sucre
- Department
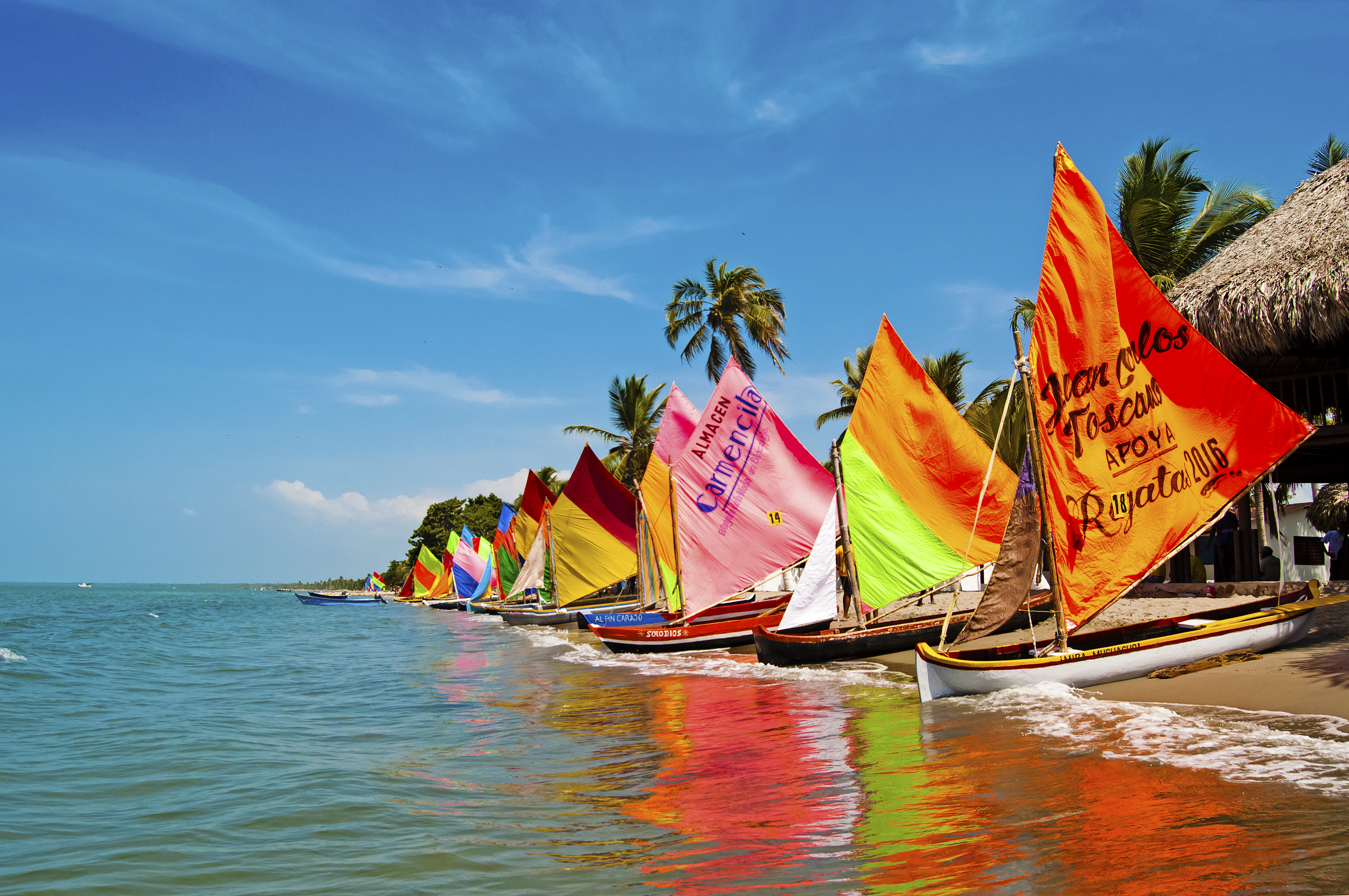
- Boat racing in Tolú

- Flag Coat of arms

- Sucre shown in red

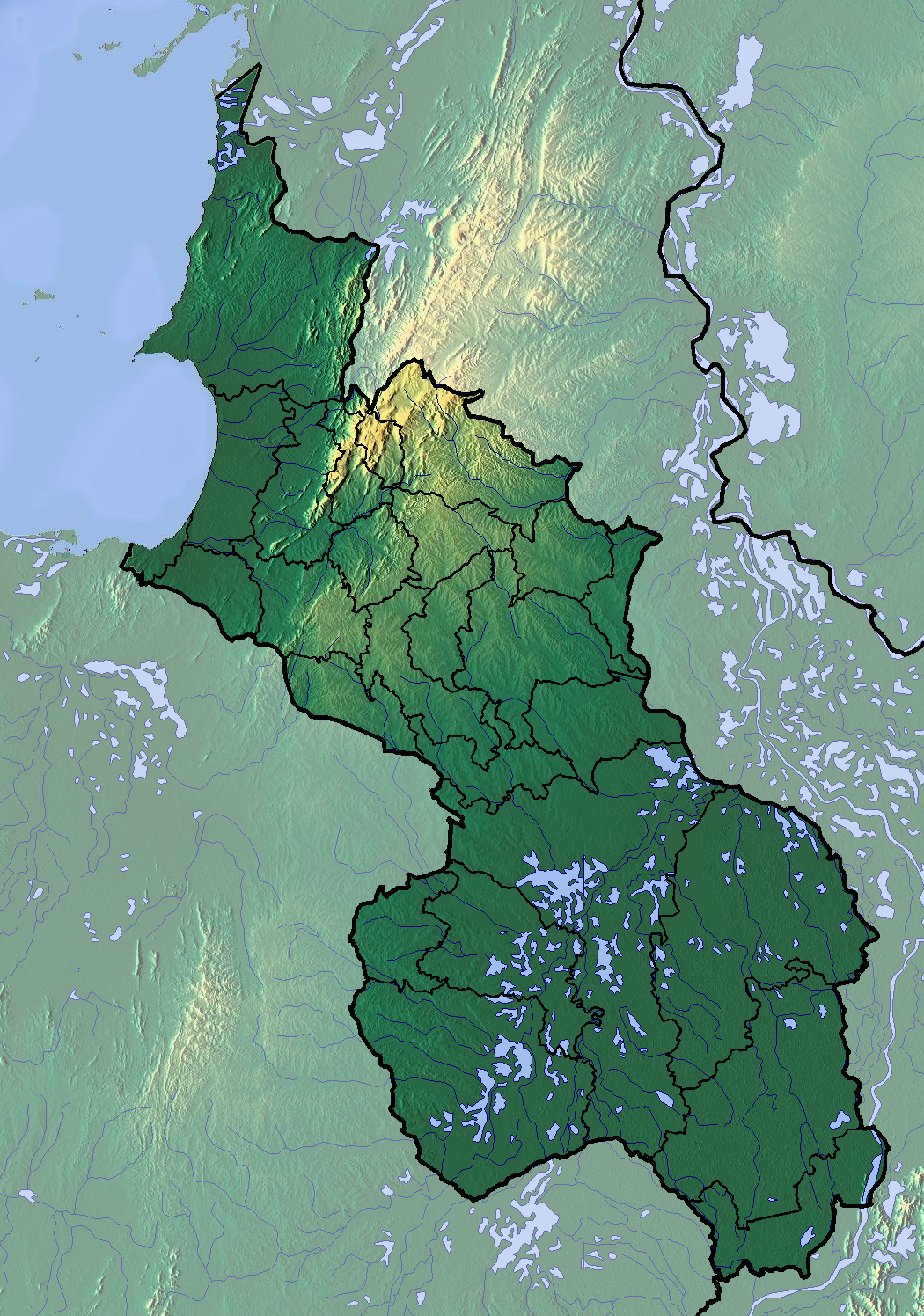
- Topography of the department
- Coordinates: 9°18′N 75°24′W
- Country: Colombia
- Region: Caribbean Region
- Established: August 18, 1966
- Capital: Sincelejo
- Largest city: Sincelejo

Government
  - Governor: Lucy Ines García Montes (2024-2027)

Area
  - Total: 10,917 km^{2} (4,215 sq mi)
  - Rank: 27th

Population (2026)
  - Total: 1,047,052
  - Rank: 21st
  - Density: 95.910/km^{2} (248.41/sq mi)

GDP
  - Total: COP 11,516 billion (US$ 2.7 billion)
- Time zone: UTC-05
- ISO 3166 code: CO-SUC
- Municipalities: 26
- HDI: 0.764 high · 19th of 33
- Website: www.sucre.gov.co

Sucre (Spanish pronunciation: [ˈsukɾe]) is a department in the Caribbean Region of Colombia. The department ranks 27th by area, 10,670 km^{2} (4,120 sq mi) and it has a population of 904,863, ranking 20th of all the 32 departments of Colombia. Sucre is bordered by the Caribbean on the northwest; by Bolívar Department on the east and by Córdoba Department on the west.

Sucre was named in honor of the Independence hero Antonio José de Sucre who was quoted by the founders of this department in reference to Simón Bolívar's death as saying "They have killed my heart", expression said while cruising the territory of the present day Sucre Department.

As of 2026, the Sucre Department has an estimated population of 1,047,052, of which 331,045 are in the department capital Sincelejo, according to the DANE projections.

== History ==
=== Pre-Columbian ===
Before the Spanish Conquest, the land comprising the department of Sucre was mainly inhabited by two groups of indigenous people — the Zenú and the Turbacos. The Zenú language was perhaps part of the Chibchan language family by the Arhuacos branch. The Turbaco people were part of the Cariban language family and they controlled the area adjacent to the Gulf of Morrosquillo. The Zenú people — by the Finzenú and Panzenú branches — controlled the rest of the territory, which used to be part of a bigger territory along the current department of Córdoba and parts of Bolívar and Antioquia sometimes known as Zenú kingdom or Zenú nation.

The area adjacent to the coast was inhabited by the Turbaco people, and it was the border lands of the Caribs' territories in the Caribbean Coast of Colombia. This specific part of the Caribbean included the coasts of the present-day departments of Magdalena, Atlántico, and Bolívar.

The Zenú engineers were able to develop a complicated hydraulic infrastructure in the basin of the San Jorge river — they also worked in the basin of the Sinú river in lands of the Córdoba Department — involving flood control works as well as drainage and irrigation systems.

=== Colonization ===
The first Spanish conquerors that sighted to the coastline of the present day Sucre Department were Alonso de Ojeda, Juan de la Cosa, Rodrigo de Bastidas and Francisco Cesar around 1499.

The conquerors thought the territory to be rich in precious metals since, but soon they would find out they were wrong about that. This situation led to the encomenderos to employ the indigenous workforce almost exclusively for cattle rising on the northern areas.

The territory had been under the tutelage of the government settled in Cartagena – except a brief period of time when it was under the jurisdiction of the central government in Bogotá – this control was effective by several denominations while the country evolved from its colonial institutions until its final republican form in 1886 and until the establishment of Sucre as a department independent from Bolivar.

Date	Territory
1535	Province of Cartagena (art of the Audience of Panama)
17th-18th centuries	Province of Cartagena (Part of the New Kingdom of Granada)
1810–1821	Department of Cundinamarca (Part of the Gran Colombia)
1821–1829	Department of Magdalena (Part of the Gran Colombia)
1830–1858	Province of Cartagena(Part of the Republic of New Granada)
1858–1863	Sovereign State of Bolívar (Part of the Granadine Confederation)
1863–1886	Sovereign State of Bolívar (Part of the United States of Colombia)
1886–1966	Departamento de Bolivar (Part of the Republic of Colombia)

=== Modern history ===
In 1963, the Second Assembly of Municipalities created the Department of Sucre. People vouched for its creation after a campaign led by CorpoSucre. On July 28, 1966, the Senate of Colombia started a debate on the creation of the department and on August 18 of the same year approved its creation under the 47 Law of 1966 sanctioned by the then-president of Colombia, Carlos Lleras Restrepo.

== Geography ==
=== Administrative Divisions ===
==== Provinces ====
Sucre is subdivided into 5 regions or provinces:

Mojana Province

- Guaranda
- Majagual
- Sucre

Montes de María Province

- Chalán
- Coloso
- Morroa
- Ovejas
- Sincelejo

Morrosquillo

- Coveñas
- Palmito
- San Onofre
- Tolú
- Tolúviejo

Sabanas

- Buenavista
- Corozal
- El Roble
- Galeras
- Los Palmitos
- Sampúes
- San Juan de Betulia
- San Pedro
- Sincé

San Jorge

- Caimito
- La Unión
- San Benito Abad
- San Marcos

==== Municipalities ====
Map of Municipalities in the Sucre Department.

Municipalities of Sucre Department by population 2026, birth and death rate 2025
Municipality	Population	Birth rate	Death rate	Natural growth
Buenavista	12,308	7.0	4.9	2.1
Caimito	18,039	6.8	2.8	4.0
Chalán	4,929	9.6	4.3	5.3
Colosó	10,421	6.5	5.2	1.3
Corozal	79,231	7.6	4.9	2.7
Coveñas	22,482	9.2	3.6	5.6
El Roble	10,654	8.9	5.8	3.1
Galeras	25,942	7.7	3.8	3.9
Guaranda	19,906	11.9	3.8	8.1
La Unión	14,349	8.0	3.7	4.3
Los Palmitos	26,166	8.2	4.2	4.0
Majagual	40,840	10.5	3.7	6.8
Morroa	17,508	8.7	3.5	5.2
Ovejas	24,693	7.3	5.3	2.0
Palmito	16,607	8.2	2.8	5.4
Sampués	54,674	8.6	3.5	5.1
San Benito Abad	32,596	7.6	3.5	4.1
San Juan Betulia	14,937	7.9	4.7	3.2
San Marcos	65,526	9.5	4.9	4.6
San Onofre	53,481	9.4	4.7	4.7
San Pedro	21,251	7.7	4.2	3.5
Sincé	32,944	5.8	5.8	0.0
Sincelejo	331,045	9.6	5.0	4.6
Sucre	34,321	4.9	3.3	1.6
Tolú	38,666	10.4	5.1	5.3
Toluviejo	23,536	8.1	4.8	3.3

==== Oceanic areas ====
The Archipelago of San Bernardo is within the Sucre Department.

A map of Archipelago of San Bernardo

=== Climate ===
January through March are dry month of almost no rainfall.

== Demography ==
According to the 2018 population census results, 12% of the population self identifies as indigenous people, gathering 5.5% of the national indigenous population; also, 11% of the population self identifies as black, creole, palenquero or afro-colombian. Venezuelans started to arrive to the department in 2016 and now represent almost 3% of the population, according to the official figures in 2022.

The rest of the population does not declare any ethnicity and are descendants mainly from Spanish, Indigenous and Black people; Arabs started to come in big numbers to Colombia after 1880 and they settled particularly in the Caribbean region of the country, including Sucre, they were mainly Lebanese, Palestinians and Syriacs arrived in smaller numbers, their descendants are estimated to be more than 3 million in the country, their contribution is noticeable in the culture, economy and politics in the Caribbean region.

As of 2022, the population is getting closer to more than 1 million inhabitants as the national and local population growth is propelled by the massive arrival of Venezuelan migrants. During the 80s and 90s the department had high fertility rates and low death rates, in recent years the growth has slowed down as the fertility rate fell below the replacement level and the demographic transition impacts the department.

Almost 32% of the entire population resided in the capital city Sincelejo and 62% of the department population lives in urban areas, specially around the capital city where Corozal, Sampues, Morroa and Los Palmitos are placed, gathering almost half a million people, according to the official population projections.

Historical population
Year	Pop.	±%
1973	411,000	—
1985	561,649	+36.7%
1990	701,105	+24.8%
2005	772,010	+10.1%
2018	904,863	+17.2%
2026	1,047,052	+15.7%

Year	Average population	Live births	Deaths	Natural change	Crude birth rate (per 1000)	Crude death rate (per 1000)	Natural change (per 1000)	Total fertility rate
2000	738,069	13,193	2,620	10,573	17.9	3.5	14.4	
2001	747,556	13,671	2,419	11,252	18.3	3.2	15.1	
2002	756,956	13,311	2,337	10,974	17.6	3.1	14.5	
2003	766,160	13,389	2,212	11,177	17.5	2.9	14.6	
2004	775,124	14,220	2,493	11,727	18.3	3.2	15.1	
2005	783,535	15,530	2,435	13,095	19.8	3.1	16.7	
2006	792,200	15,058	2,555	12,503	19.0	3.2	15.8	
2007	800,848	15,042	2,798	12,244	18.8	3.5	15.3	
2008	809,414	16,021	2,577	13,444	19.8	3.2	16.6	2.4
2009	817,937	15,551	2,817	12,734	19.0	3.4	15.6	2.3
2010	826,411	14,332	2,749	11,583	17.3	3.3	14.0	2.1
2011	834,736	15,481	2,534	12,947	18.5	3.0	15.5	2.3
2012	842,950	15,480	2,837	12,643	18.4	3.4	15.0	2.3
2013	851,157	14,863	3,090	11,773	17.5	3.6	13.9	2.2
2014	859,324	15,090	3,240	11,850	17.6	3.8	13.8	2.2
2015	867,701	14,558	3,460	11,098	16.8	4.0	12.8	2.1
2016	877,397	14,398	3,615	10,783	16.4	4.1	12.3	2.1
2017	888,638	15,467	3,808	11,659	17.4	4.3	13.1	2.2
2018	904,863	15,338	4,042	11,296	17.0	4.5	12.5	2.2
2019	928,362	14,844	4,256	10,588	16.0	4.6	11.4	2.0
2020	953,654	14,094	5,147	8,947	14.8	5.4	9.4	1.9
2021	972,704	14,877	5,770	9,107	15.3	5.9	9.4	1.9
2022	988,782	13,637	4,811	8,826	13.8	4.9	8.9	1.7
2023	1,004,176	11,986	4,672	7,314	11.9	4.7	7.2	1.5
2024	1,019,575	9,537	4,661	4,876	9.4	4.6	4.8	1.2
2025	1,034,102	9,027	4,701	4,326	8.7	4.6	4.1	1.1
2026	1,047,052							

== Current vital statistics ==
Period	Live births	Deaths	Natural increase
January–July 2025	5,065	2,666	+2,400
January–July 2026	5,030	2,994	+2,036
Difference	▼ −35 (−0.7%)	▲ +328 (+12.3%)	▼ −363 (−15.1%)
