= List of Interjet destinations =

Interjet served the following destinations prior to its suspension in December 2020:

Hub
Terminated destination

Country-city	Airport code		Airport name	Refs
Country-city	IATA	ICAO	Airport name	Refs
Canada
Montreal	YUL	CYUL	Montréal–Pierre Elliott Trudeau International Airport	
Toronto	YYZ	CYYZ	Toronto Pearson International Airport	
Vancouver	YVR	CYVR	Vancouver International Airport	
Colombia
Bogotá	BOG	SKBO	El Dorado International Airport	
Cartagena	CTG	SKCG	Rafael Núñez International Airport	
Medellín	MDE	SKRG	José María Córdova International Airport	
Costa Rica
San José de Costa Rica	SJO	MROC	Juan Santamaría International Airport	
Cuba
Havana	HAV	MUHA	José Martí International Airport	
Santa Clara	SNU	MUSC	Abel Santamaría Airport	
Varadero	VRA	MUVR	Juan Gualberto Gómez Airport	
Ecuador
Guayaquil	GYE	SEGU	José Joaquín de Olmedo International Airport	
Quito	UIO	SEQM	Mariscal Sucre International Airport	
El Salvador
San Salvador	SAL	MSLP	Monseñor Óscar Arnulfo Romero International Airport	
Guatemala
Guatemala City	GUA	MGGT	La Aurora International Airport	
Mexico
Acapulco	ACA	MMAA	Acapulco International Airport	
Aguascalientes	AGU	MMAS	Aguascalientes International Airport	
Campeche	CPE	MMCP	Campeche International Airport	
Cancún	CUN	MMUN	Cancún International Airport	
Chetumal	CTM	MMCM	Chetumal International Airport	
Chihuahua	CUU	MMCU	Chihuahua International Airport	
Ciudad Obregón	CEN	MMCN	Ciudad Obregón International Airport	
Ciudad Juárez	CJS	MMCS	Ciudad Juárez International Airport	
Ciudad del Carmen	CME	MMCE	Ciudad del Carmen International Airport	
Cozumel	CZM	MMCZ	Cozumel International Airport	
Culiacán	CUL	MMCL	Culiacán International Airport	
Durango	DGO	MMDO	Durango International Airport	
Guadalajara	GDL	MMGL	Guadalajara International Airport	
Hermosillo	HMO	MMHO	Hermosillo International Airport	
Huatulco	HUX	MMBT	Bahías de Huatulco International Airport	
Ixtapa/Zihuatanejo	ZIH	MMZH	Ixtapa-Zihuatanejo International Airport	
La Paz	LAP	MMLP	La Paz International Airport	
León/El Bajío	BJX	MMLO	Del Bajío International Airport	
Los Mochis	LMM	MMLM	Los Mochis International Airport	
Manzanillo	ZLO	MMZO	Playa de Oro International Airport	
Mazatlán	MZT	MMMZ	Mazatlán International Airport	
Mérida	MID	MMMD	Mérida International Airport	
Mexico City	MEX	MMMX	Mexico City International Airport	
Minatitlán	MTT	MMMT	Minatitlán/Coatzacoalcos International Airport	
Monterrey	MTY	MMMY	Monterrey International Airport	
Oaxaca	OAX	MMOX	Oaxaca International Airport	
Palenque	PQN	MMPQ	Palenque International Airport	
Puerto Escondido	PXM	MMPS	Puerto Escondido International Airport	
Puerto Vallarta	PVR	MMPR	Licenciado Gustavo Díaz Ordaz International Airport	
Reynosa	REX	MMRX	Reynosa International Airport	
San José del Cabo	SJD	MMSD	Los Cabos International Airport	
San Luis Potosí	SLP	MMSP	San Luis Potosí International Airport	
Tampico	TAM	MMMT	Tampico International Airport	
Tapachula	TAP	MMTP	Tapachula International Airport	
Tijuana	TIJ	MMTJ	Tijuana International Airport	
Toluca	TLC	MMTO	Toluca International Airport	
Torreón	TRC	MMTC	Torreón International Airport	
Tuxtla Gutiérrez	TGZ	MMTG	Tuxtla Gutiérrez International Airport	
Veracruz	VER	MMVR	Veracruz International Airport	
Villahermosa	VSA	MMVA	Villahermosa International Airport	
Zacatecas City	ZCL	MMZC	Zacatecas International Airport	
Peru
Lima	LIM	SPJC	Jorge Chávez International Airport	
United States
Chicago	ORD	KORD	O'Hare International Airport	
Dallas	DFW	KDFW	Dallas/Fort Worth International Airport	
Houston	IAH	KIAH	George Bush Intercontinental Airport	
Las Vegas	LAS	KLAS	McCarran International Airport	
Los Angeles	LAX	KLAX	Los Angeles International Airport	
Miami	MIA	KMIA	Miami International Airport	
New York City	JFK	KJFK	John F. Kennedy International Airport	
Orange County	SNA	KSNA	John Wayne Airport	
Orlando	SFB	KSFB	Orlando Sanford International Airport	
Orlando	MCO	KMCO	Orlando International Airport	
San Antonio	SAT	KSAT	San Antonio International Airport	
San Francisco	SFO	KSFO	San Francisco International Airport	
