= Sincelejo =

- Municipality and City
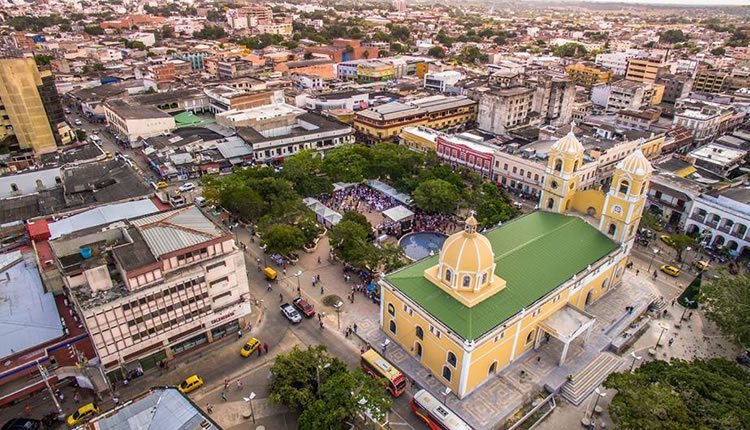
- Downtown

- Flag Coat of arms
- Nickname: La Perla de la Sabana / La Ciudad del Encuentro
- Motto: "Más Soluciones, Más Compromiso" (More Solutions, More Commitment)
- Location of the municipality and city of Sincelejo in the Department of Sucre

- Location within Colombia
- Coordinates: 9°17′42″N 75°23′46″W
- Country: Colombia
- Region: Caribbean Region
- Department: Sucre
- Established: October 4, 1535
- Founder: Antonio de la Torre y Miranda

Government
  - Type: Municipality
  - Mayor: Yahir Fernando Acuña Cardales (2024-2027)

Area
  - Municipality and City: 278.4 km^{2} (107.5 sq mi)
  - Urban: 30.63 km^{2} (11.83 sq mi)
- Highest elevation: 240 m (790 ft)
- Lowest elevation: 180 m (590 ft)

Population (2023)
  - Municipality and City: 310,456
  - Density: 1,115/km^{2} (2,888/sq mi)
  - Urban: 273,124
  - Urban density: 8,917/km^{2} (23,090/sq mi)
- Demonym: Sincelejano
- Time zone: UTC-5 (EST)
- Area code: 57 + 5
- Website: www.alcaldiadesincelejo.gov.co (in Spanish)

Sincelejo (Spanish pronunciation: [sinseˈlexo]) is the capital and largest city of the Colombian department of Sucre in the Caribbean region. It is also the capital of the department's subregion, Sabanas, and is the 25th largest city by population of the country. It is located 30 kilometers from the Caribbean Sea at the Gulf of Morrosquillo, 125 kilometers from Cartagena, and 200 kilometers from Barranquilla.

== Etymology ==
The origin of the name Sincelejo is a subject of controversy, and there is no consensus on its source. The most widely accepted theory is that the Spanish city is named after the cacique, Cincel, who is believed to have been the leader of the indigenous people who inhabited the area where the town was founded. One author states, without citation, that this theory is supported by documents in the General National Archives (AGN) in Bogota.

== History ==
In the pre-columbian era, the regions lands were inhabited by several groups of indigenous people known as the Zenú.

The village of Sincelejo was founded on October 4, 1535, the feast day of Francis of Assisi, with the name San Francisco de Asís de Sincelejo. The village was part of Alonso Padilla's encomienda between 1610 and 1640, and was located on the site of a small Zenú indigenous settlement. At that time, the indigenous people were exploited by the Spanish colonizers, or "encomenderos".

On November 21, 1775, Sincelejo was re-founded by the Spanish captain and engineer, Antonio de la Torre y Miranda, following orders from Cartagena's governor, Juan de Torrezar Díaz Pimienta. The construction of the town began with a church, while the lands around the church were given to people who used to live across the region; in order to create a religious and political center within the region. The city plan of Sincelejo was intended to follow the classical Spanish colonial grid, with the main church and its square in the center of the town, but this was not possible because of several creeks that ran through its center.

In 1812, Sincelejo became shelter for the revolutionary priests in La Rebelión de los Curas (the Priests' Insurrection).

By 1887, Sincelejo was one of the largest settlements in the Province of Cartagena. In 1908 it became the capital of the short-lived department of Sincelejo (Spanish: Departamento de Sincelejo), ultimately becoming part of the Province of Cartagena again in 1910. In 1912, Sincelejo was nearly destroyed by a conflagration which consumed most of the central zone; nevertheless the town was rebuilt. With the creation of the Sucre Department in 1966, Sincelejo subsequently became its capital.

== Geography ==
The geography of Sincelejo is characterized by a hilly landscape which extends from the mountains to the borders of the plateau in the north and south. The small mountain foothills in the municipality span from the marine fluvial plain in the west to the border shared with the town of Palmito. Erosion is common in the rugged topography of the rolling hills, which are moderately to strongly broken, with slopes between 7 and 50% and altitudes ranging from 50 to 260 meters.

Sincelejo is bordered by the municipalities of Palmito and Tolú to the west, Sampués and Córdoba Department to the south, Corozal and Morroa to the east, and Toluviejo to the north.

=== Climate ===
Sincelejo has a tropical climate and its temperatures remain fairly consistent throughout the year, with an average temperature of about 27 °C (80.6 °F). According to the Köppen climate classification, it has a tropical wet and dry climate (Aw).

The drought season usually starts in December and lasts until the end of February. The rainy season then peaks in April or May. In June and July precipitation decreases, in a period called "Veranillo de San Juan", until it increases once more.

Climate data for Sincelejo
Month	Jan	Feb	Mar	Apr	May	Jun	Jul	Aug	Sep	Oct	Nov	Dec	Year
Mean daily maximum °C (°F)	32.7 (90.9)	32.8 (91.0)	33.4 (92.1)	32.9 (91.2)	31.6 (88.9)	31.1 (88.0)	31.9 (89.4)	31.5 (88.7)	30.8 (87.4)	30.5 (86.9)	30.6 (87.1)	31.5 (88.7)	31.8 (89.2)
Daily mean °C (°F)	26.4 (79.5)	26.8 (80.2)	27.5 (81.5)	27.5 (81.5)	27.0 (80.6)	26.6 (79.9)	26.7 (80.1)	26.5 (79.7)	26.2 (79.2)	25.9 (78.6)	26.0 (78.8)	26.1 (79.0)	26.6 (79.9)
Mean daily minimum °C (°F)	20.1 (68.2)	20.9 (69.6)	21.6 (70.9)	22.2 (72.0)	22.4 (72.3)	22.1 (71.8)	21.6 (70.9)	21.6 (70.9)	21.6 (70.9)	21.4 (70.5)	21.4 (70.5)	20.7 (69.3)	21.5 (70.6)
Average rainfall mm (inches)	20.4 (0.80)	23.1 (0.91)	21.8 (0.86)	119.0 (4.69)	180.0 (7.09)	145.4 (5.72)	124.3 (4.89)	157.6 (6.20)	170.2 (6.70)	164.0 (6.46)	103.9 (4.09)	58.6 (2.31)	1,288.3 (50.72)
Average rainy days	3	3	4	9	14	12	11	15	14	13	10	5	113
Average relative humidity (%)	77	76	76	78	82	83	81	83	84	84	83	79	81
Mean monthly sunshine hours	234.2	211.8	199.1	156.8	141.2	167.1	199.9	188.4	144.7	155.7	164.2	217.0	2,180.1

== Administrative divisions ==
Sincelejo is subdivided into an urban zone and a rural zone. The urban zone is divided into 9 Comunas (townships), while the rural has 21 divisions called Corregimientos.

Communas

- North-east: La Selva and Villa Orieta
- West: San Carlos and Kennedy
- South-west: Pioneros and Argelia
- Central-west: Majagual and El Zumbado
- Center: La Palma and La Ford
- North: Vega and La Fé
- North-west: Margaritas and Florencia
- South: Uribe and Gran Colombia
- South-east: Verbel and El Progreso

Corregimientos

- North (Zone 1): San Rafael, La Arena, La Chivera, Las Majaguas, and La Peñata
- West (Zone 2): Las Huertas, Laguna Flor, Cerrito de la Palma, Cruz del Beque, and San Antonio
- South (Zone 3): Buenavista, Buenavistica, San Martín, San Jacinto, Cerro del Naranjo, Babilonia, Sabanas del Potreto, and La Gallera
- East (Zone 4): Las Palmas, Castañeda, and Chochó

== Demographics ==
Historical population
Year	Pop.	±%
1775	2,855	—
1852	6,046	+111.8%
1870	11,336	+87.5%
1918	14,722	+29.9%
1951	21,625	+46.9%
1964	44,001	+103.5%
1973	71,946	+63.5%
1985	120,537	+67.5%
1993	168,410	+39.7%
2005	237,639	+41.1%
2018	277,773	+16.9%
2026	331,045	+19.2%
Source: DANE

As of 2023, Sincelejo had a population of 310,456. 85.1% recognize themselves as Whites, Arabs and/or Mestizos, 11.5% recognize themselves as Indigenous people and 3.4% as Afro-Colombians.

Year	Average population	Live births	Deaths	Natural change	Crude birth rate (per 1000)	Crude death rate (per 1000)	Natural change (per 1000)	Total fertility rate
2000	219,691	5,234	892	4,342	23.8	4.1	19.7	
2001	223,225	5,150	859	4,291	23.1	3.9	19.2	
2002	225,038	5,275	852	4,423	23.4	3.8	19.6	
2003	229,035	4,627	745	3,882	20.2	3.3	16.9	
2004	232,250	4,727	884	3,843	20.4	3.8	16.6	
2005	235,222	5,316	893	4,423	22.6	3.8	18.8	
2006	238,311	5,396	977	4,419	22.6	4.1	18.5	
2007	241,380	5,343	1,027	4,316	22.1	4.3	17.8	
2008	244,436	5,645	992	4,653	23.1	4.1	19.0	2.6
2009	247,432	5,336	1,033	4,303	21.6	4.2	17.4	2.4
2010	250,413	5,009	1,030	3,979	20.0	4.1	15.9	2.3
2011	253,394	5,550	970	4,580	21.9	3.9	18.0	2.5
2012	256,326	5,702	1,217	4,485	21.3	4.8	17.5	2.6
2013	259,277	5,347	1,239	4,108	20.6	4.8	15.8	2.4
2014	262,199	5,591	1,201	4,390	21.3	4.6	16.7	2.5
2015	265,212	5,494	1,449	4,045	20.7	5.5	15.2	2.4
2016	268,622	5,520	1,415	4,105	20.6	5.3	15.3	2.4
2017	272,534	5,848	1,498	4,350	21.5	5.5	16.0	2.5
2018	277,773	5,718	1,516	4,202	20.6	5.5	15.1	2.5
2019	286,099	5,377	1,588	3,789	18.8	5.6	13.2	2.3
2020	295,008	4,871	1,854	3,017	16.5	6.3	10.2	2.0
2021	301,886	5,168	2,046	3,122	17.1	6.8	10.3	2.0
2022	307,953	4,614	1,596	3,018	15.0	5.2	9.8	1.8
2023	313,864	4,060	1,629	2,431	12.9	5.2	7.7	1.5
2024	319,888	3,300	1,674	1,626	10.3	5.2	5.1	1.2
2025	325,685	3,126	1,638	1,488	9.6	5.0	4.6	1.1
2026	331,045							

== Current vital statistics ==
Period	Live births	Deaths	Natural increase
January–July 2025	1,757	942	+815
January–July 2026	1,793	1,064	+729
Difference	▲ +36 (+2.0%)	▲ +122 (+13.0%)	▼ −86 (−10.6%)

== Economy ==
The main economic activities of the municipality of Sincelejo revolve around the land use of neighboring departments, specifically in livestock, agriculture, and commerce. The largest sector within Sincelejo is its livestock sector, and the city has been called the "Capital Cebuísta de Colombia" (English: Zebu Capital of Colombia) for its prized beef cattle production. Sincelejo also has a significant dairy farming sector, but beef cattle are the dominant contributor to the city's economy. Agriculture is the city's second largest sector, and is characterized by the production of maize, cassava, yams, and bananas.

Trade, government agencies, and other services supplement the primary activities of the agricultural sector. Industry is beginning to grow in the city with new factories, including Postobón facilities, almidón (starch production), clothing, footwear, icopor (styrofoam), metal equipment, bricks, concrete, construction materials, and wood processing. According to a recent census of the Industry and Commerce department, there are about 3000 businesses operating in the capital.

== Culture ==
The traditional music of Sincelejo includes the Porro, Fandango, and Vallenato. The traditional dish of this city is mote de queso, a soup prepared with cheese. The city is known for its handicrafts made by the native inhabitants, including hammocks and sombreros vueltiaos. The sombrero vueltiao is also a national symbol of Colombia.

The city hosts a number of cultural festivals annually, including the Fiestas del dulce nombre de Jesús, the Encuentro Nacional de Bandas, and the Festival Sabanero del Accordeón. The Encuentro Nacional de Bandas (English: National Meeting of the Bands) is a musical contest where folk bands perform the traditional musical styles of the Savanna Region: Porro and Fandango, which has been held annually since 1984. The Festival Sabanero del Accordeón (English: Savanna's Accordion Festival) has been held since 1974, and celebrates the folk musical styles of the Sabana region played on the accordion, including the styles of: Paseo, Merengue, Vallenato, and Puya.

=== Corraleja ===
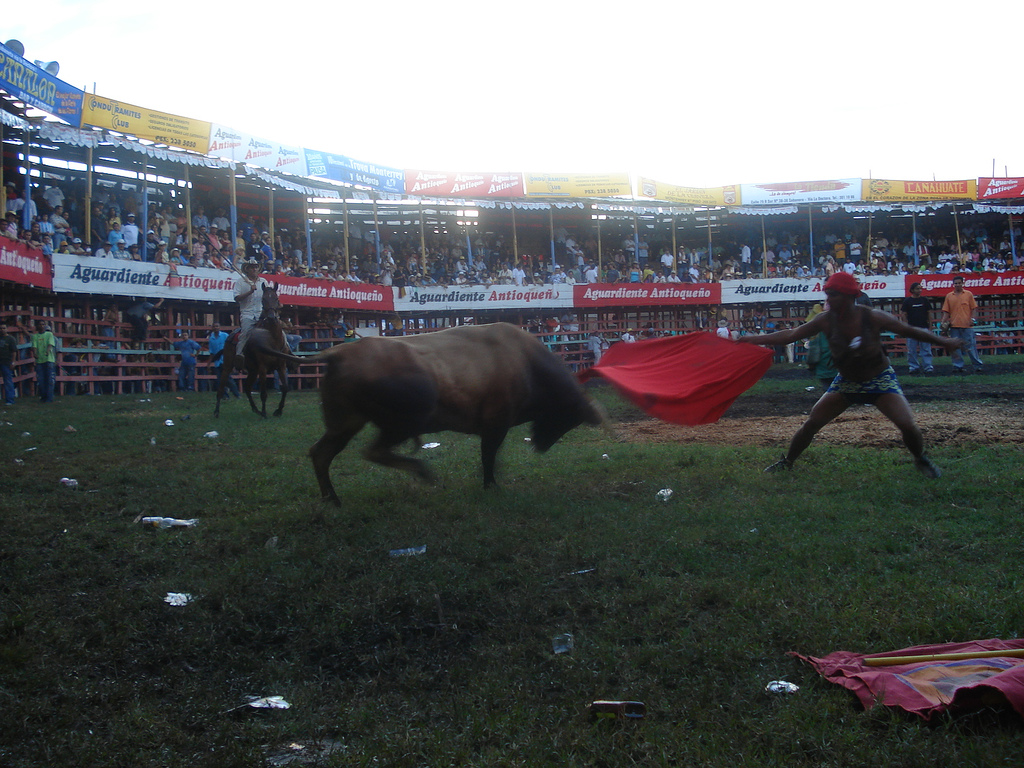
Minnor Corraleja in Sincelejo

Sincelejo is best known for its annual festival called Fiestas del dulce nombre de Jesús (English: Celebrations of the Sweet Name of Jesus), which is held every year on January 20. The entire festival lasts several days, and includes a number of parades, a beauty contest, and bullfighting.

Because of the bullfighting tradition, the festival is also known as Las Fiestas de Corraleja, so named after the temporary wooden bullring used for the event, called a corraleja. On January 20, 1980, a combination of overcrowding and panic caused the bullring's wooden bleachers to collapse, killing at least 222 people, although some estimates place the total number at 400. As a result of this tragedy, the Corraleja part of the festival was suspended for several years. In 1999, the municipality reauthorised the annual construction of the wooden structure, which reinstated the bullfighting tradition. Today, the construction of the temporary bullring starts towards the end of December, and civil engineers and architects supervise the project.

The bullfighting usually takes place over several days, with different cattle farms supplying about 40 bulls per day. On the final day, the cattle farm with the most entertaining performance is given an official reward. There is no official prize for bullfighters who enter the ring and participate in the festival, but wealthy landowners often offer an unofficial monetary incentive to encourage participation. The picadors are usually sourced from local cattle ranches and are paid for their work, though they also benefit from "unofficial incentives". A single day ticket to watch the event typically costs about 15–35 USD, though the last day of the event is usually more expensive.

Like other bullfighting events, the festival is criticized for animal cruelty. It is also subject to criticism for the consumption of alcohol during the event and the lack of training and safety provided to bullfighters. Anyone participating in the event as a bullfighter must purchase insurance, which is sold on site, to cover emergency medical care in the ring.

=== Sites of interest ===
Majagual Plaza

Majagual Plaza: Usually called La Placita de Majagual (English: The Little Plaza of Majagual), it has been referred to in several folk songs by artists such as Joe Arroyo. This plaza was the cite of the city's corralejas for many years before it moved to La Plaza de Mochila. Since then, Majagual Plaza has only been used for sports activities. In 2007, the plaza was refurbished and reopened with a post-modern design featuring an arch-shaped sculpture and a wide square for cultural events.

Santander Park and Saint Francis of Assis Cathedral

Santander Park: Santander Park opened in 1776, along with the formal establishment of the city. It was the first place that the corralejas were held in the city, and the park hosted the event from 1845 until 1964 when it was moved to Majagual Plaza.

Saint Francis of Assisi Cathedral: The Catedral San Francisco de Asís was established in 1853 and is located adjacent to Santander Park. It is the center of the religious celebrations and festivals in Sincelejo, including Las Fiestas del Dulce Nombre de Jesús. The cathedral is also the seat of the Roman Catholic Diocese of Sincelejo.

Sincelejo's Municipality Theater: The theater was established in 1997. Its facilities host concerts, musicals, folk events, and operas.

VIVA Sincelejo Shopping Center: The VIVA Sincelejo Shopping Center (Spanish: Centro Comercial VIVA Sincelejo) opened in August 2006, as Saint Francisco Shopping Center (Spanish: Centro Comercial San Francisco) on Las Peñitas Avenue (Avenida Las Peñitas). In 2011, construction of a new mall in the same place began, which now hosts approximately 91 shops.

== Infrastructure ==
=== Media ===
There are two local daily newspapers which circulate in Sincelejo: El Meridiano de Sucre and El Universal Sincelejo. There are also regional and national newspapers such as El Tiempo, El Espectador, and El Heraldo. There are several radio stations, including local stations as well as stations like RCN Radio and Caracol Radio. Sincelejo receives five national television channels: RCN, Caracol, Canal Uno, Señal Colombia and Señal Institucional. There are two cable TV services: Claro and Cable Unión. Claro has the only local TV channel named Canal Doce (Channel 12) which is available for its subscribers. It includes several programs as well as a newscast devoted to Sincelejo and its zone of influence.

=== Transportation ===
Sincelejo is known for being an important crossroads on the Caribbean coast of Colombia. It is placed close to several important towns in the region – Montería, Magangué, Coveñas and San Marcos – and it is also relatively close to important cities in Colombia like Barranquilla, Cartagena, Valledupar and Medellín. There is regular transportation from Sincelejo to these cities by bus and taxi, with taxis being a little more expensive. 15 kilometers away from Sincelejo is Las Brujas Airport where there are daily flights to the major cities of Bogotá and Medellín.

=== Education ===
As the main city in Sucre and the Sabana Región, Sincelejo has a large number of students, with 35 public schools and several private schools. Universidad de Sucre, the only public university in Sucre, is located in the city. There are also several private universities, including: CECAR, CORPOSUCRE, CUN, Universidad San Martín, Universidad Santo Tomás, as well as a local office of the Universidad de Pamplona. There are several institutions offering technical and technological training the most important being the local facility of SENA. Sincelejo also has several institutions devoted to cultural work such as La Escuela de Bellas Artes (School of Fine Art) and Batuta.

== Gallery ==
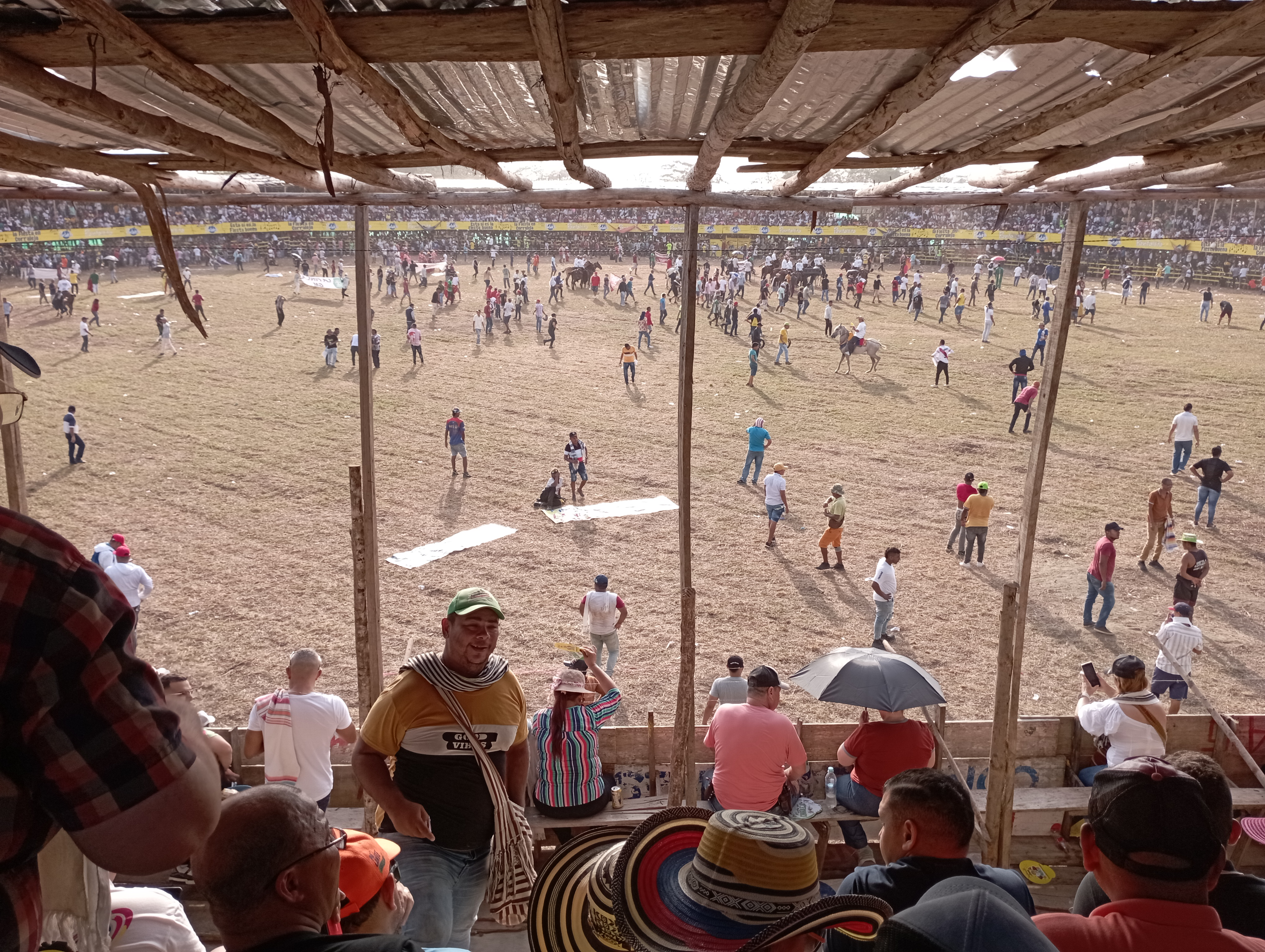
Corralejas At Sincelejo, Sucre, Colombia.

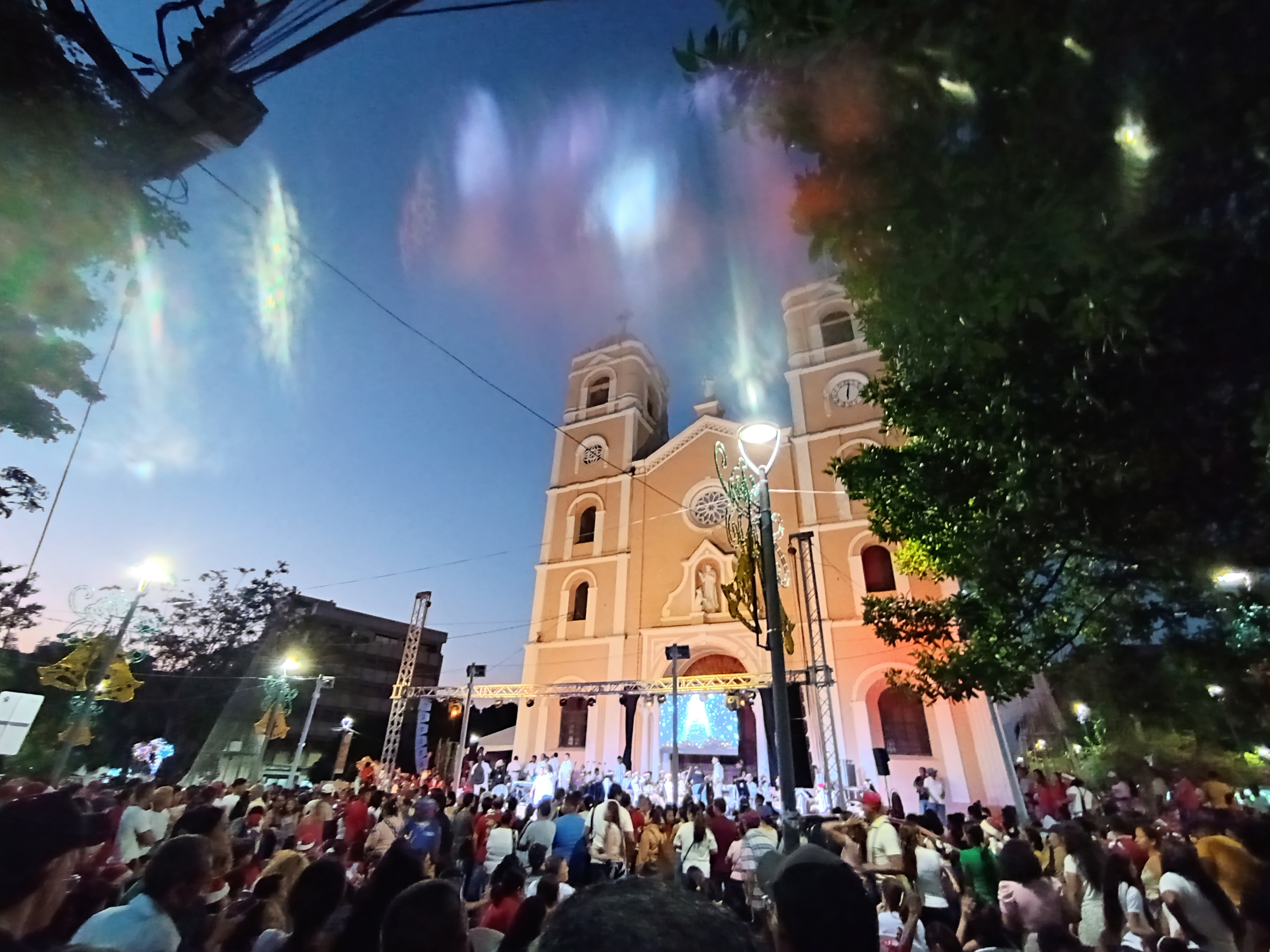
Francis of Assisi Cathedral. Seat of Diocese of Sincelejo. Roman Catholic. Latin Rite.

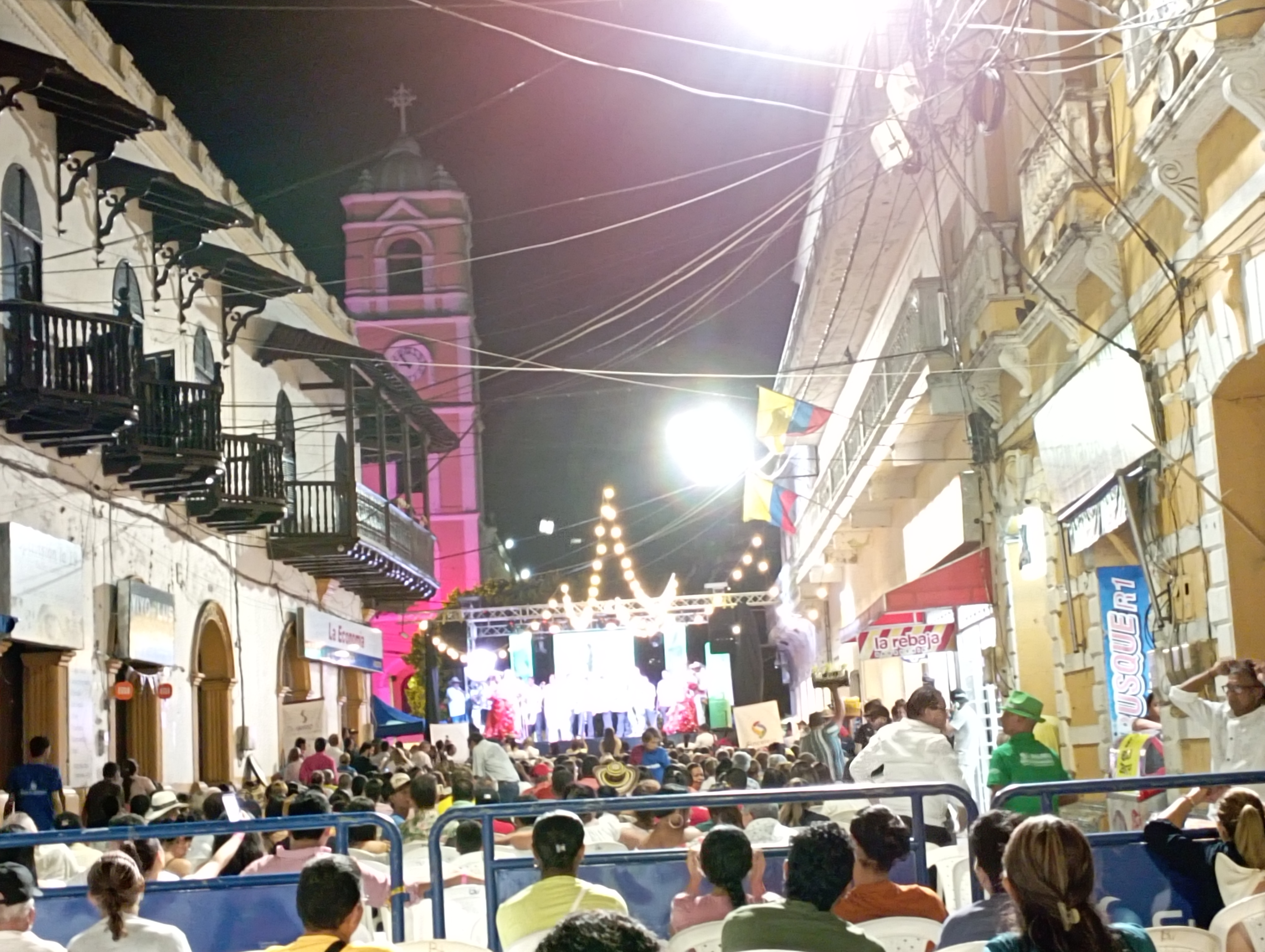
Encuentro Nacional de Bandas Sincelejo. ( in Spanish: National Bands Meeting Sincelejo).

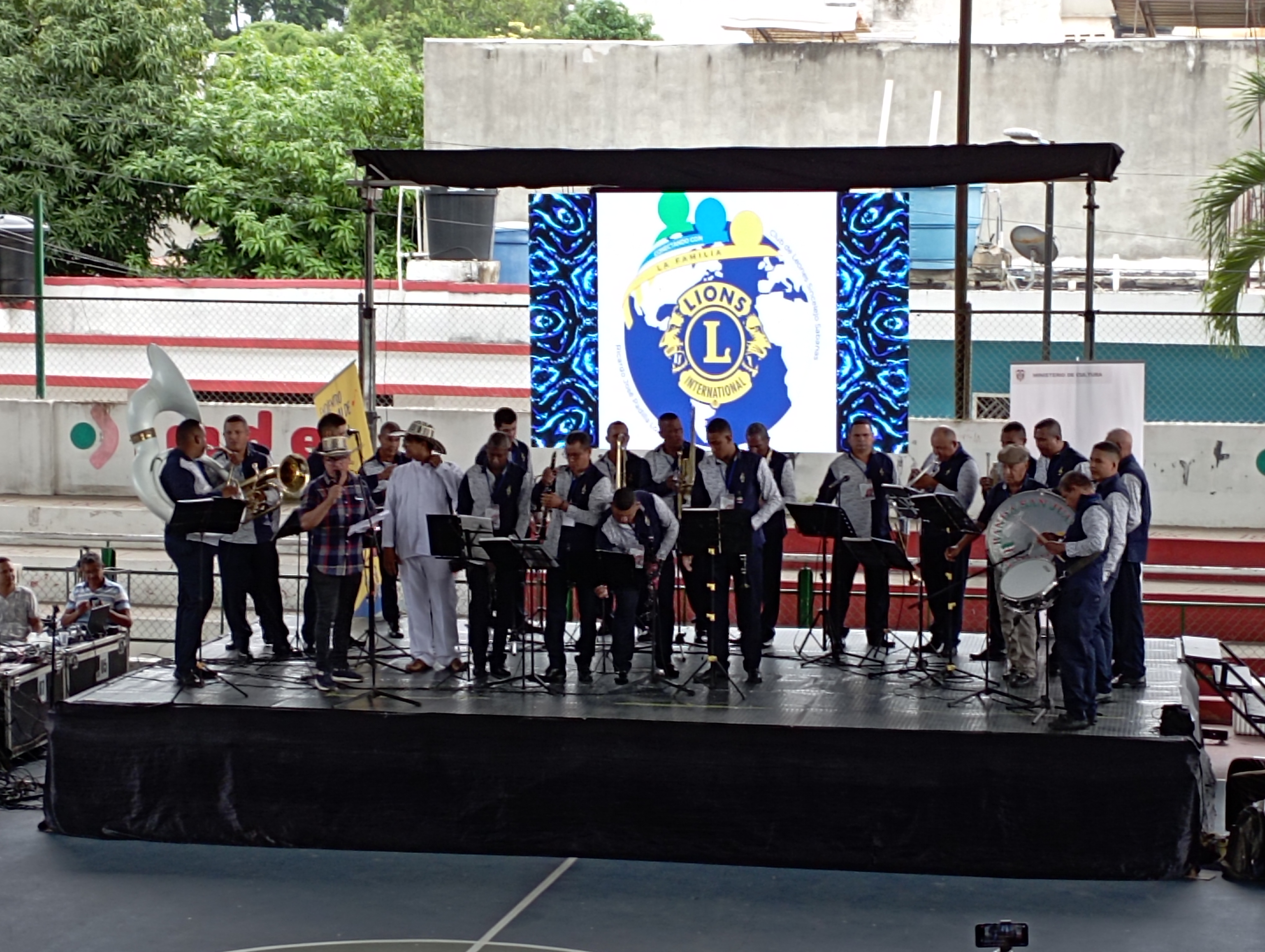
San Juan de Caimito´s Band participating at National Band Meeting. Sincelejo.

== Notable residents ==
- Jorge Alfaro, Major League Baseball Player.
- Ariadna Gutiérrez, Model and Beauty Pageant Titleholder.
- Verónica Alcocer, First Lady of Colombia.
- Yahir Acuña, former Member of the House of Representatives.
