= Grupo Aeroportuario del Sureste =

Mexican airport operator

Grupo Aeroportuario del Sureste, S.A.B. de C.V.
- Type: Sociedad Anónima Bursátil de Capital Variable
- Traded as: BMV: ASUR; NYSE: ASR
- Industry: Airport Services
- Founded: 1 April 1998; 28 years ago
- Headquarters: Mexico City, Mexico
- Number of locations: 16 airports
- Area served: Southeast of Mexico
- Key people: Fernando Chico Pardo (Chairman); Adolfo Castro Rivas (CEO)
- Revenue: ▲US$ 1,681.84 million (2024)
- Net income: ▲US$ 753.1 million (2024)
- Total assets: ▲US$ 4,489,358.6 million (2024)
- Number of employees: 1,936
- Website: www.asur.com.mx
- Footnotes; Source: Annual Report

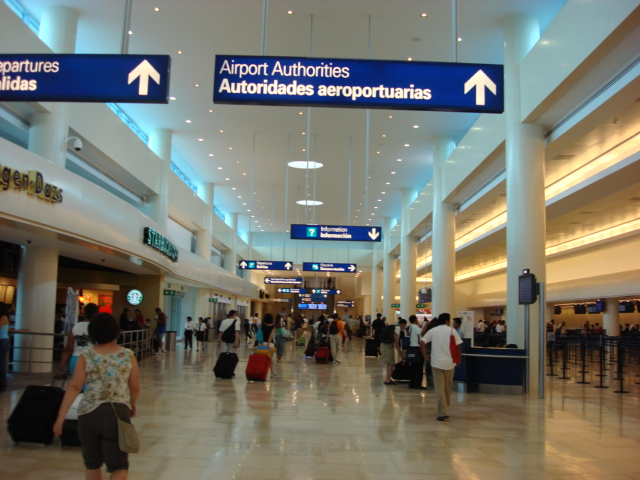
Cancún International Airport Terminal 3

Grupo Aeroportuario del Sureste, S.A.B. de C.V., known as ASUR, is a Mexican airport operator headquartered in Mexico City, Mexico. It operates 9 airports in the southeastern states of Mexico, including that of Cancún. It is the third largest airport services company by passenger traffic in Mexico. It serves approximately 23 million passengers annually.

ASUR is listed on the Mexican Stock Exchange and in the NYSE. It is a constituent of the IPC, the main benchmark index of the Mexican Stock Exchange.

== History ==
ASUR was created in 1996 as the Mexican government started the privatisation of the country airport network. In 2000, ASUR launched its IPO on the NYSE (through ADRs) and the Mexican Stock Exchange, making 74.9% of the capital public. In 2004, Fernando Chico Pardo becomes the main shareholder of the company. In 2005, the government privatized its remaining 11.1% shares it owned in ASUR, making the company 100% privately held.

In 2008, ASUR reached 17.8 million yearly passengers. In 2012, 19.3 million passengers travelled through ASUR's airports. In 2013, 21 million passengers were recorded in ASUR's airports.

In November 2011, ASUR agreed to sell 49% of its shares of Inversiones y Tecnicas Aeroportuarias (ITA) to the transport company ADO.

In July 2012, in a 50/50 joint-venture with Highstar Capital, ASUR won the bid to operate the Luis Muñoz Marín International Airport (San Juan, Puerto Rico) for a 40-year term.

In December 2015, ASUR signed a deal with SunPower to purchase 36 megawatts of solar energy to power its network of airports and comply with its objective to reduce carbon emissions.

In March 2016, amid a financial crisis of domestic competitor OMA (Grupo Aeroportuario Centro Norte), ASUR considered acquiring the airport operator.

== Airports ==
=== Airports in Mexico ===
Airport	City	State	ICAO	IATA
Cancún International Airport	Cancún	Quintana Roo	MMUN	CUN
Cozumel International Airport	Cozumel	Quintana Roo	MMCZ	CZM
Bahías de Huatulco International Airport	Huatulco	Oaxaca	MMBT	HUX
Mérida International Airport	Mérida	Yucatán	MMMD	MID
Minatitlán International Airport	Minatitlán	Veracruz	MMMT	MTT
Oaxaca International Airport	Oaxaca	Oaxaca	MMOX	OAX
Tapachula International Airport	Tapachula	Chiapas	MMTP	TAP
Veracruz International Airport	Veracruz	Veracruz	MMVR	VER
Villahermosa International Airport	Villahermosa	Tabasco	MMVA	VSA

=== Map ===
Airports in Mexico operated by ASUR
Purple = Major airports (over 5 million passengers)
Red = International and domestic service
Green = Domestic service only

=== Airports in the Caribbean and South America ===
Airport	City	Country	ICAO	IATA
Antonio Roldán Betancourt Airport	Apartado	Colombia	SKLC	APO
Las Brujas Airport	Corozal	Colombia	SKCZ	CZU
Olaya Herrera Airport	Medellín	Colombia	SKMD	EOH
Los Garzones Airport	Montería	Colombia	SKMR	MTR
El Caraño Airport	Quibdó	Colombia	SKUI	UIB
José María Córdova International Airport	Rionegro	Colombia	SKRG	MDE
Luis Muñoz Marín International Airport	San Juan	Puerto Rico	TJSJ	SJU

== Passenger numbers ==
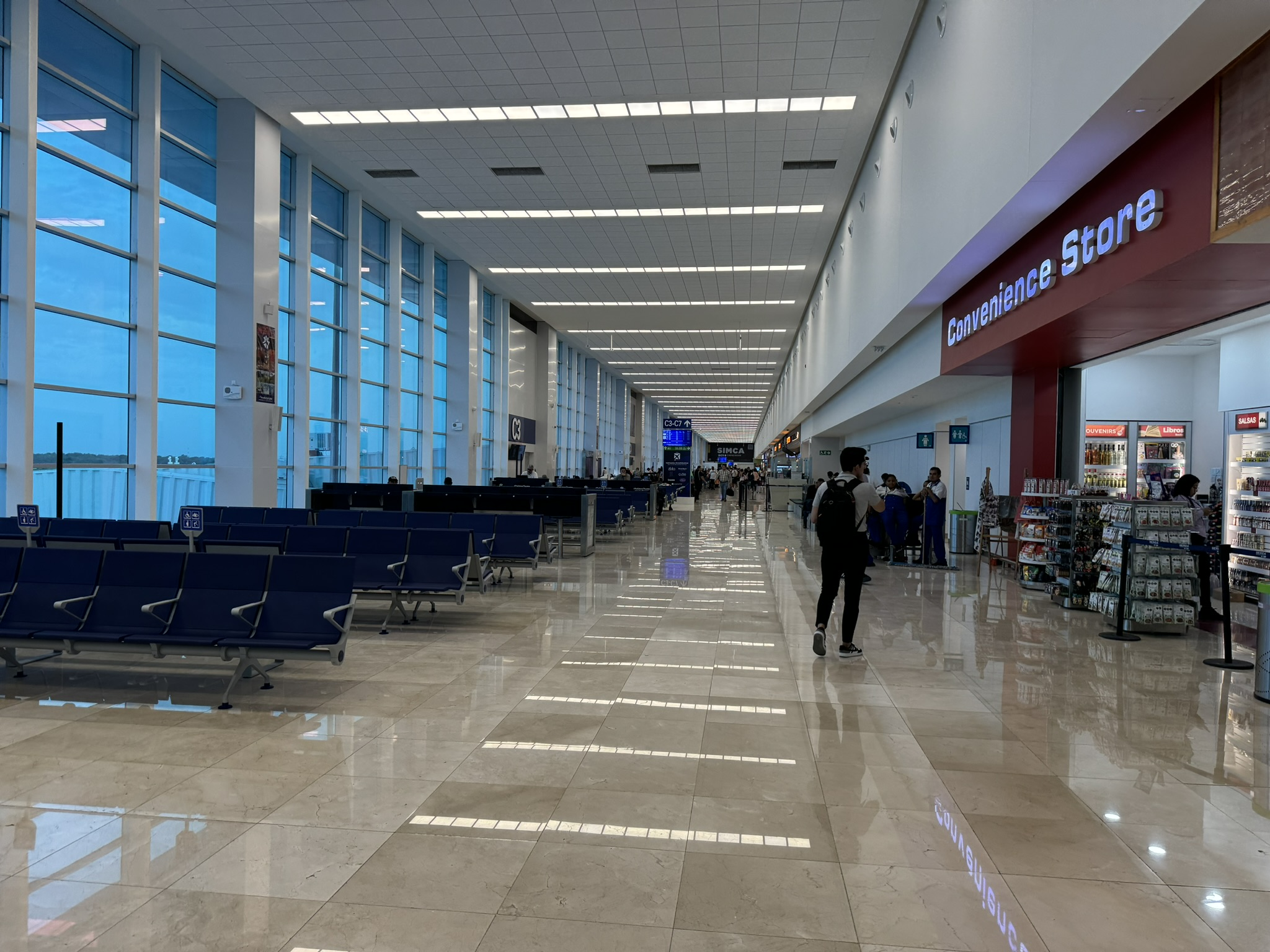
Merida International Airport departures concourse

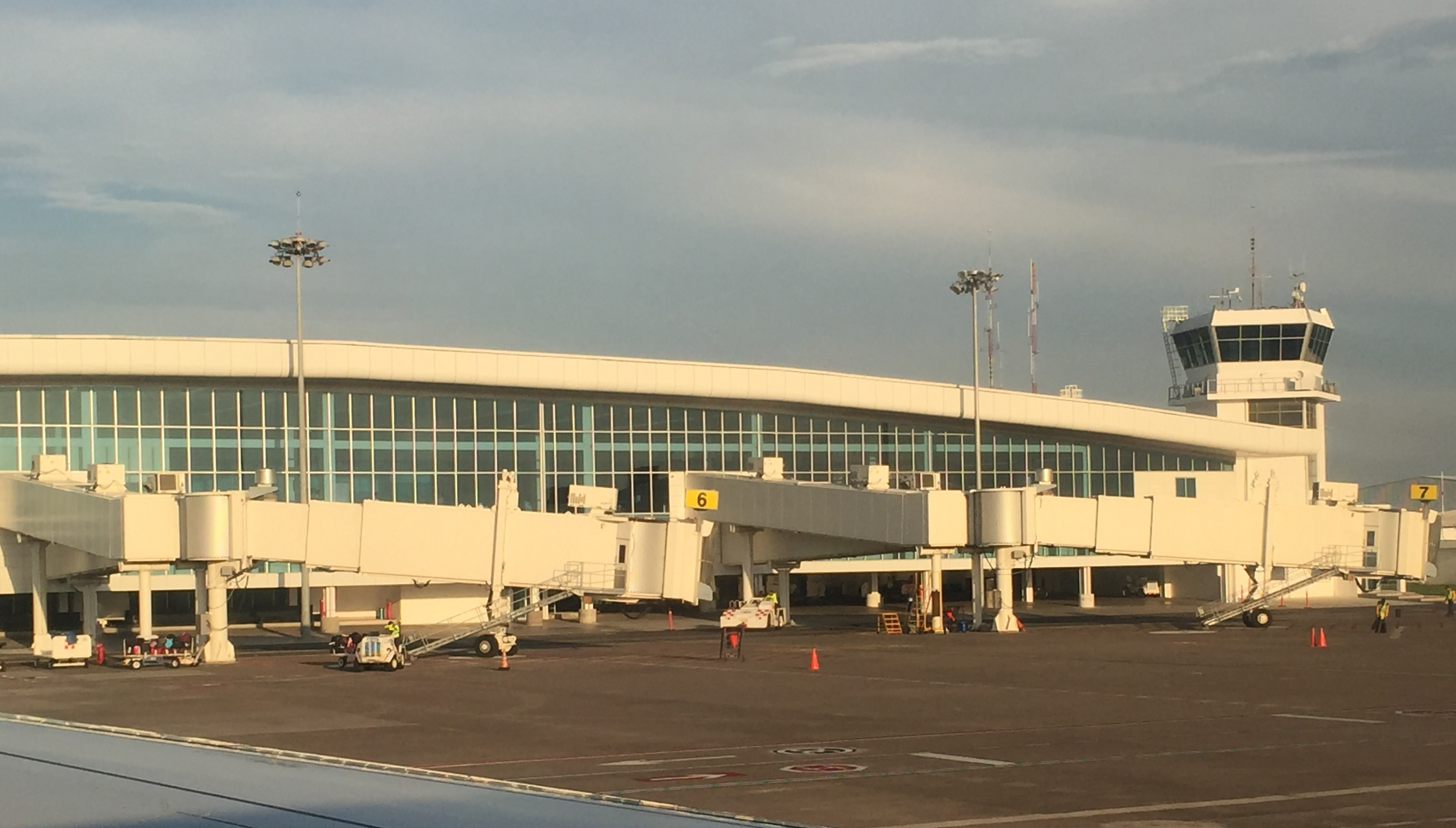
Veracruz International Airport

=== Airports in Mexico ===
Number of passengers at each airport by 2025:

Rank	Airport	City	State	Passengers
1	Cancún International Airport	Cancún	Quintana Roo	29,345,538
2	Mérida International Airport	Mérida	Yucatán	3,939,692
3	Veracruz International Airport	Veracruz	Veracruz	1,872,697
4	Oaxaca International Airport	Oaxaca	Oaxaca	1,864,967
5	Villahermosa International Airport	Villahermosa	Tabasco	1,447,408
6	Bahías de Huatulco International Airport	Huatulco	Oaxaca	801,803
7	Cozumel International Airport	Cozumel	Quintana Roo	646,606
8	Tapachula International Airport	Tapachula	Chiapas	519,105
9	Minatitlán International Airport	Minatitlán	Veracruz	157,913
Total				40,595,729

=== Airports in the Caribbean and South America ===
Number of passengers at each airport by 2025:

Airport	City	Country	Passengers
José María Córdova International Airport	Rionegro	Colombia	14,093,689
Luis Muñoz Marín International Airport	San Juan	Puerto Rico	13,643,686
Los Garzones Airport	Montería	Colombia	1,434,557
Olaya Herrera Airport	Medellín	Colombia	1,193,558
El Caraño Airport	Quibdó	Colombia	362,612
Antonio Roldán Betancur Airport	Carepa	Colombia	183,409
Las Brujas Airport	Corozal	Colombia	52,539

== See also ==
- List of airports in Mexico
- List of the busiest airports in Mexico
- Busiest airports in North America
- Busiest airports in Latin America
- Airfields in Baja California
- Airfields in Baja California Sur
- Small airstrips
- Military bases
- Air Force bases
- Naval air bases
- Lists of airports
- International airports
- Defunct airports
- Airports by ICAO code
- Airlines of Mexico
- Airline hubs
- Airline destinations
- Transportation in Mexico
- Tourism in Mexico
- Federal Civil Aviation Agency
- Grupo Aeroportuario del Sureste
- Grupo Aeroportuario del Pacífico
- Grupo Aeroportuario del Centro Norte
- Aeropuertos y Servicios Auxiliares
- List of busiest airports by passenger traffic
- Metropolitan areas of Mexico
