= Las Brujas Airport (Colombia) =

Las Brujas Airport Aeropuerto Las Brujas
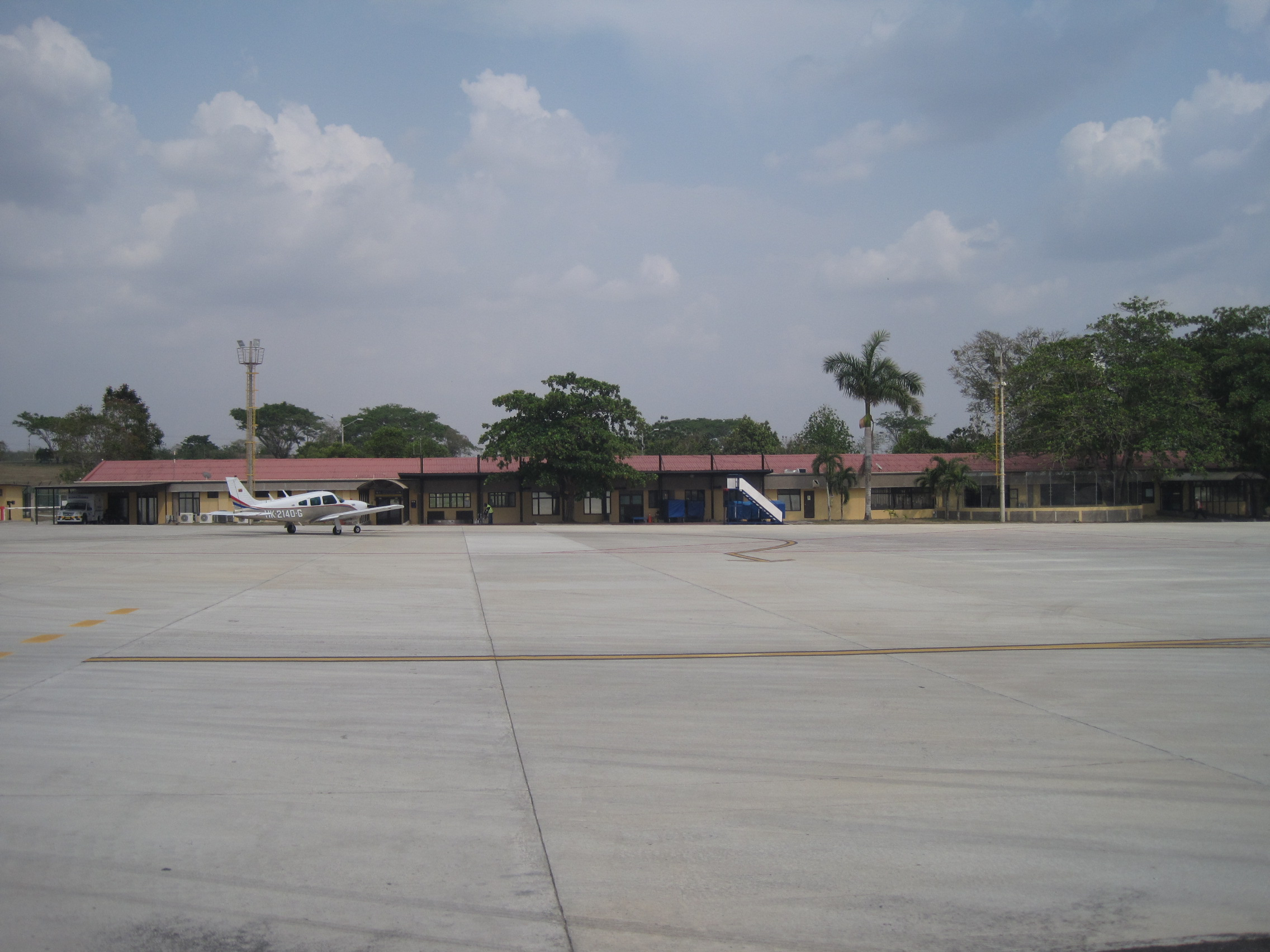
- IATA: CZU; ICAO: SKCZ

Summary
- Airport type: Public
- Operator: Grupo Aeroportuario del Sureste
- Serves: Corozal, Sincelejo
- Elevation AMSL: 528 ft / 161 m
- Coordinates: 9°20′00″N 75°17′06″W

Map
- Location of airport in Colombia

Runways
Direction	Length		Surface
Direction	m	ft	Surface
02/20	1,800	5,906	Asphalt

Statistics (2023)
- Total passengers: 26,419
- Source: Grupo Aeroportuario del Sureste

Las Brujas Airport (IATA: CZU, ICAO: SKCZ) is a domestic airport located in the town of Corozal, Sucre in Colombia. The airport is located 10 minutes from the capital of the department, the city of Sincelejo. In emergency situations, it serves as the alternate airport of the city of Montería. It has regional and national operations with regular passenger services to Bogotá and Medellín.

In 2016, the airport handled 71,181 passengers, and 81,472 in 2017.

== History ==
On July 12, 1939, the first plane landed, inaugurating the services of the Las Brujas airport, which had been under construction at the initiative of SCADTA and illustrious personalities since 1938. The opening flight of the airport was operated by the airline SCADTA (current Avianca), with a Sikorsky S-38 hybrid aircraft.

== Airlines and destinations ==
Airlines	Destinations
Clic	Barranquilla, Medellín–Olaya Herrera
SATENA	Bogotá

== See also ==
- Transport in Colombia
- List of airports in Colombia
