= Yahir Acuña =

Colombian politician

Member of the Chamber of Representatives
- In office July 20, 2010 – October 21, 2014
- Constituency: Sucre

Personal details
- Born: Yahir Fernando Acuña Cardales; September 30, 1980 (age 45) Sincelejo, Sucre, Colombia
- Party: Citizen Option

Yahir Fernando Acuña Cardales (born September 30, 1980) is a Colombian politician. He was a Member of the Chamber of Representatives representing Sucre. In 2015, he resigned from Chamber of Representatives to run for the governorship of Sucre and named his wife as a candidate. As of December 31, 2015, he faced a total of 13 disciplinary and criminal investigations file against him by the Colombian Justice Department. Two days before the elections, Acuña had 487million pesos in cash confiscated by the Colombian highway police.
