= Tapachula International Airport =

International airport in Tapachula, Chiapas, Mexico

Tapachula International Airport Aeropuerto Internacional de Tapachula
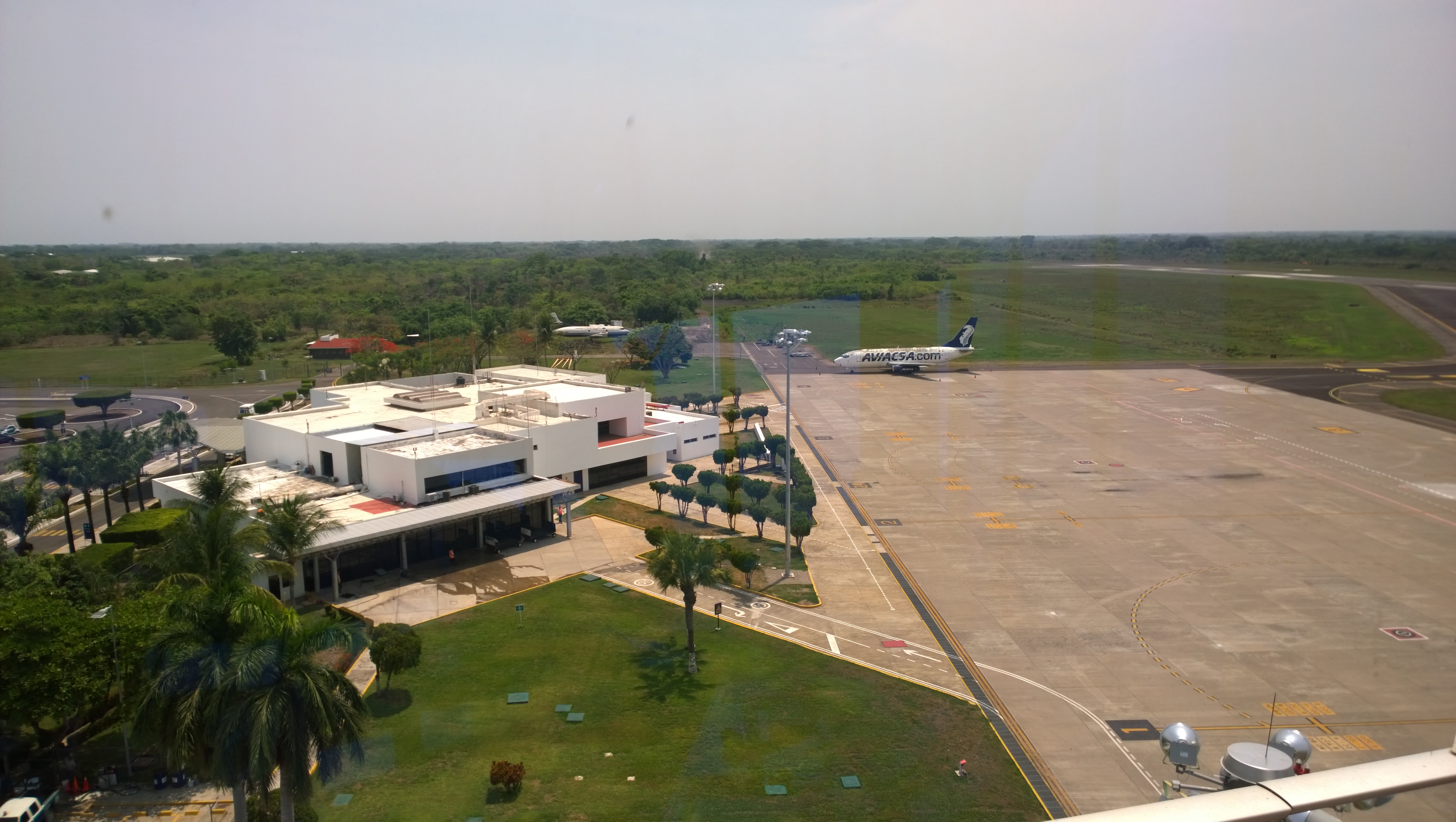
- IATA: TAP; ICAO: MMTP

Summary
- Airport type: Public
- Operator: Grupo Aeroportuario del Sureste
- Serves: Tapachula, Chiapas, Mexico
- Time zone: CST (UTC-06:00)
- Elevation AMSL: 30 m / 98 ft
- Coordinates: 14°47′40″N 092°22′12″W
- Website: www.asur.com.mx/Contenido/Tapachula/shopping

Map
- Location of the airport in Chiapas TAP (Mexico)

Runways
Direction	Length		Surface
Direction	m	ft	Surface
05/23	2,000	6,562	Asphalt

Statistics (2025)
- Total passengers: 519,105
- Ranking in Mexico: 39th ▼4
- Source: Grupo Aeroportuario del Sureste

Tapachula International Airport (Spanish: Aeropuerto Internacional de Tapachula) (IATA: TAP, ICAO: MMTP) is an international airport located in Tapachula, Chiapas, Mexico, near the Mexico–Guatemala border. It serves the Metropolitan Area of Tapachula and the Soconusco region, facilitating multiple domestic destinations, flight training, and general aviation activities. Operated by Grupo Aeroportuario del Sureste (ASUR), it holds the distinction of being the southernmost airport in Mexico. In 2024, it served 614,936 passengers, and 519,105 passengers in 2025.

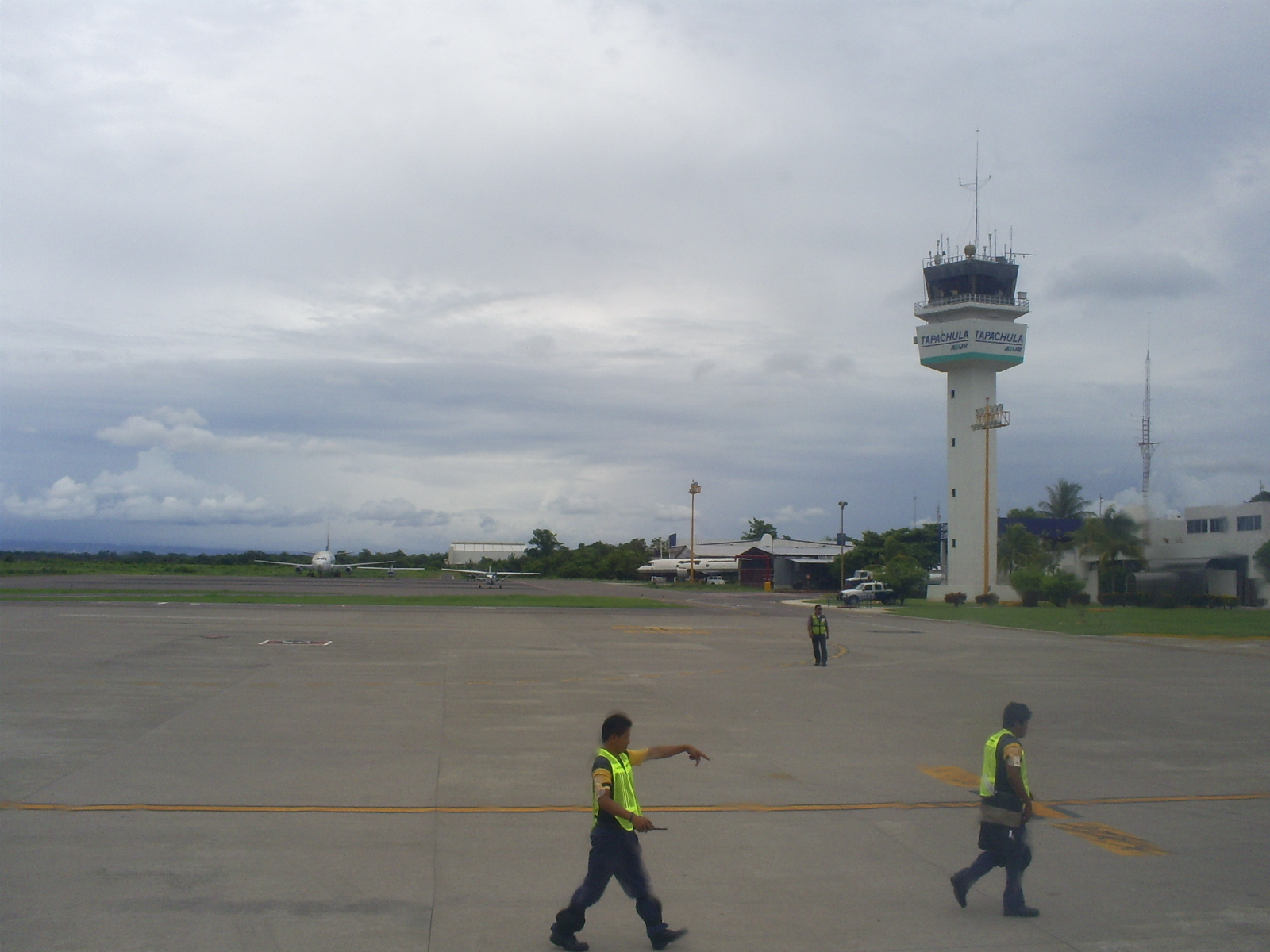
Tapachula Airport apron and control tower

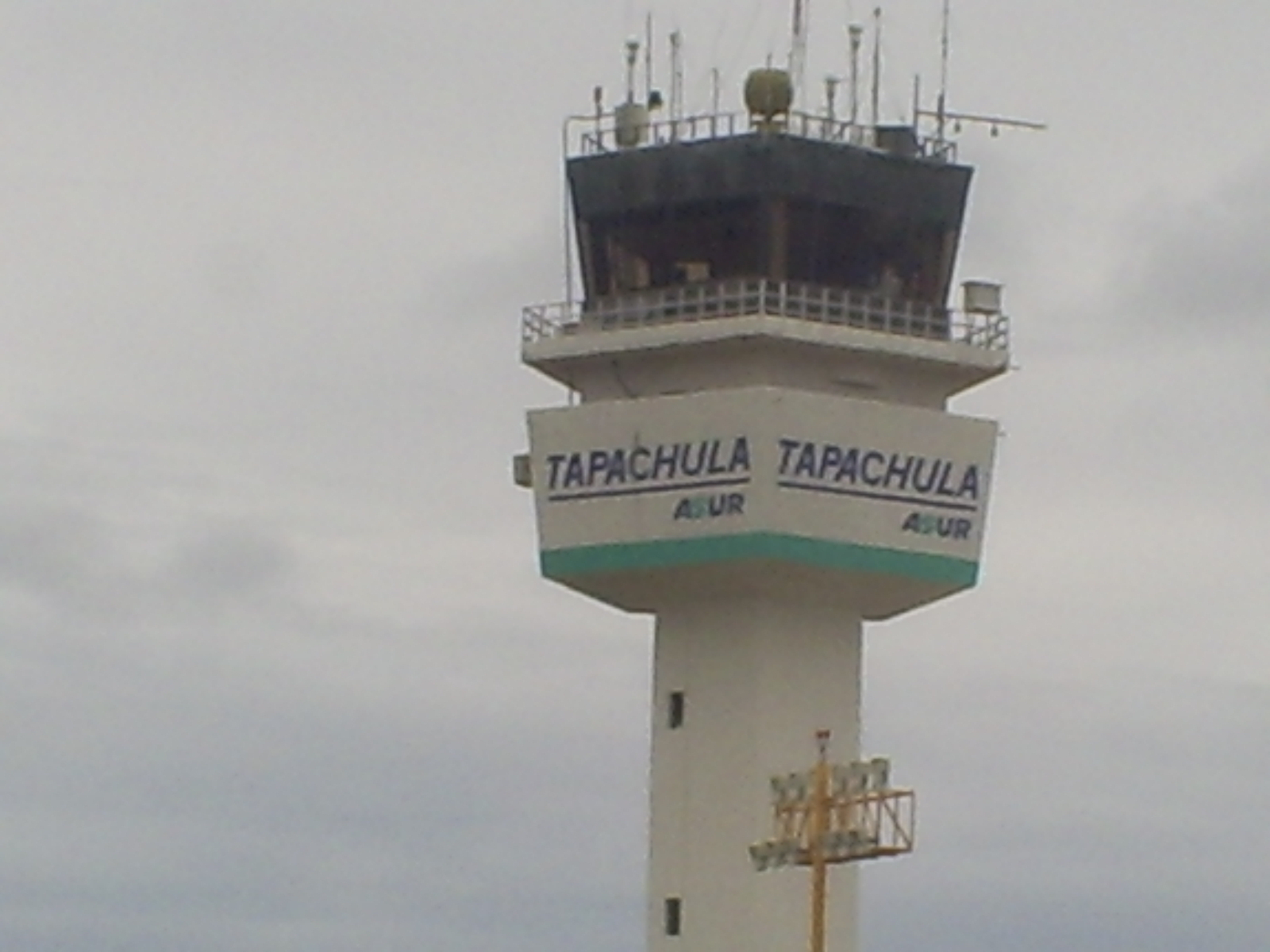
Tapachula Airport control tower

== Facilities ==
Tapachula Airport is situated at an elevation of 30 metres (98 ft) above sea level and features a 2,000 metres (6,600 ft) asphalt runway. With an ICAO classification of 4D, the airport has a capacity for 18 operations per hour. The apron includes 3 C-type disembarkation hardstands and 1 D-type.

The terminal spans 3,783 square metres (40,720 sq ft) within a two-level structure. The lower level houses essential services such as the check-in area, an arrivals hall with a baggage claim area, immigration and customs facilities, car rental services, taxi stands, and snack bars. Upstairs, the upper floor features a security checkpoint and the departures concourse, offering a commercial area, bars, a VIP lounge, and four gates—two of which are equipped with jet bridges. Adjacent to the terminal, additional facilities include hangars and designated spaces for general aviation.

Tapachula Airport also hosts the Tapachula Naval Air Base, situated near the threshold of runway 23. This base comprises an apron spanning 10,000 square metres (110,000 sq ft), 1 heliport, and 3 hangars. Operating from this base are the 4th Naval Patrol Air Squadron with Mil Mi-17 aircraft and the 4th Naval Air Mobility, Observation, and Transport Squadron with Maule MX-7 and Lancair ES aircraft.

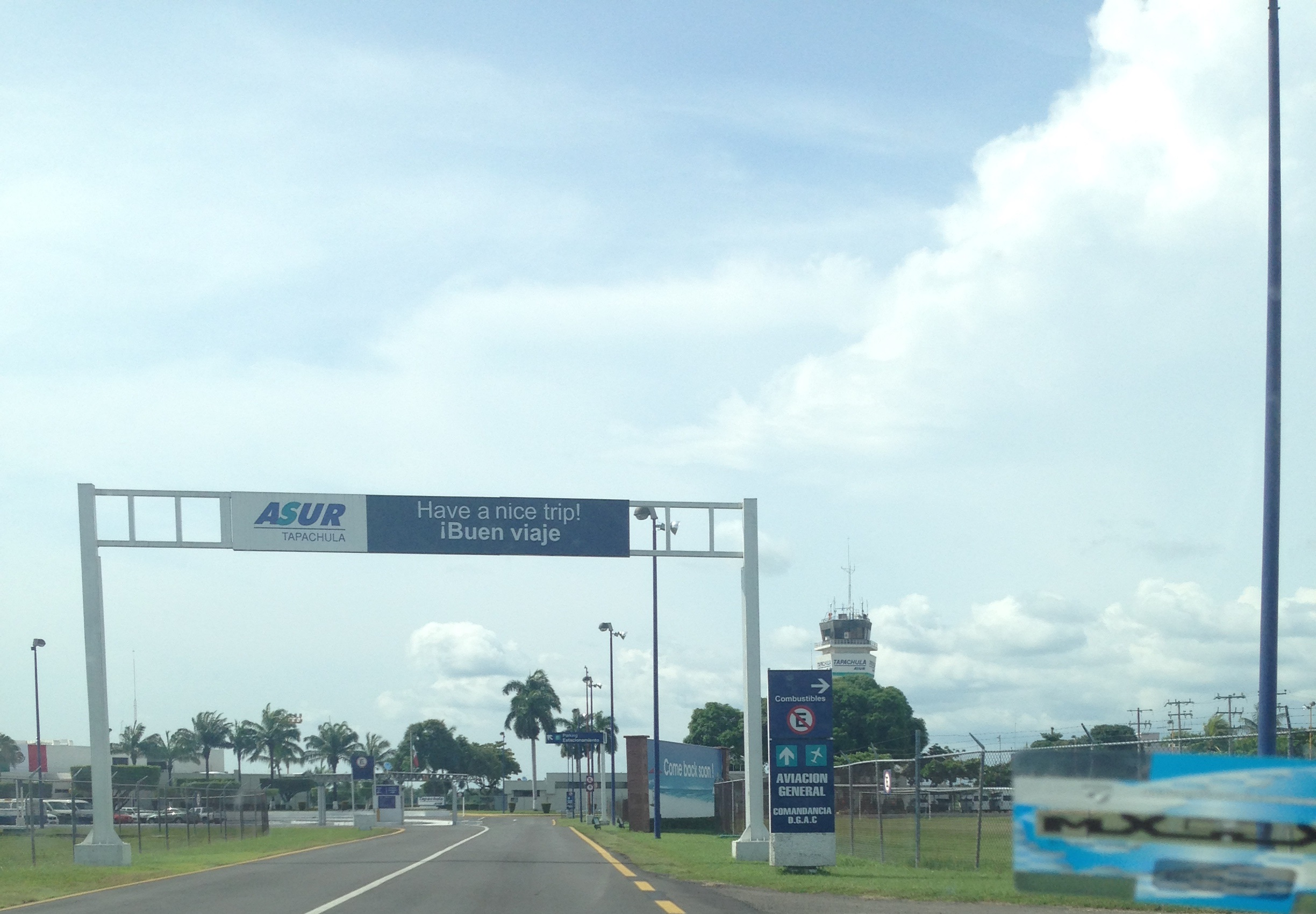
Tapachula Airport´s main entrance

== Airlines and destinations ==
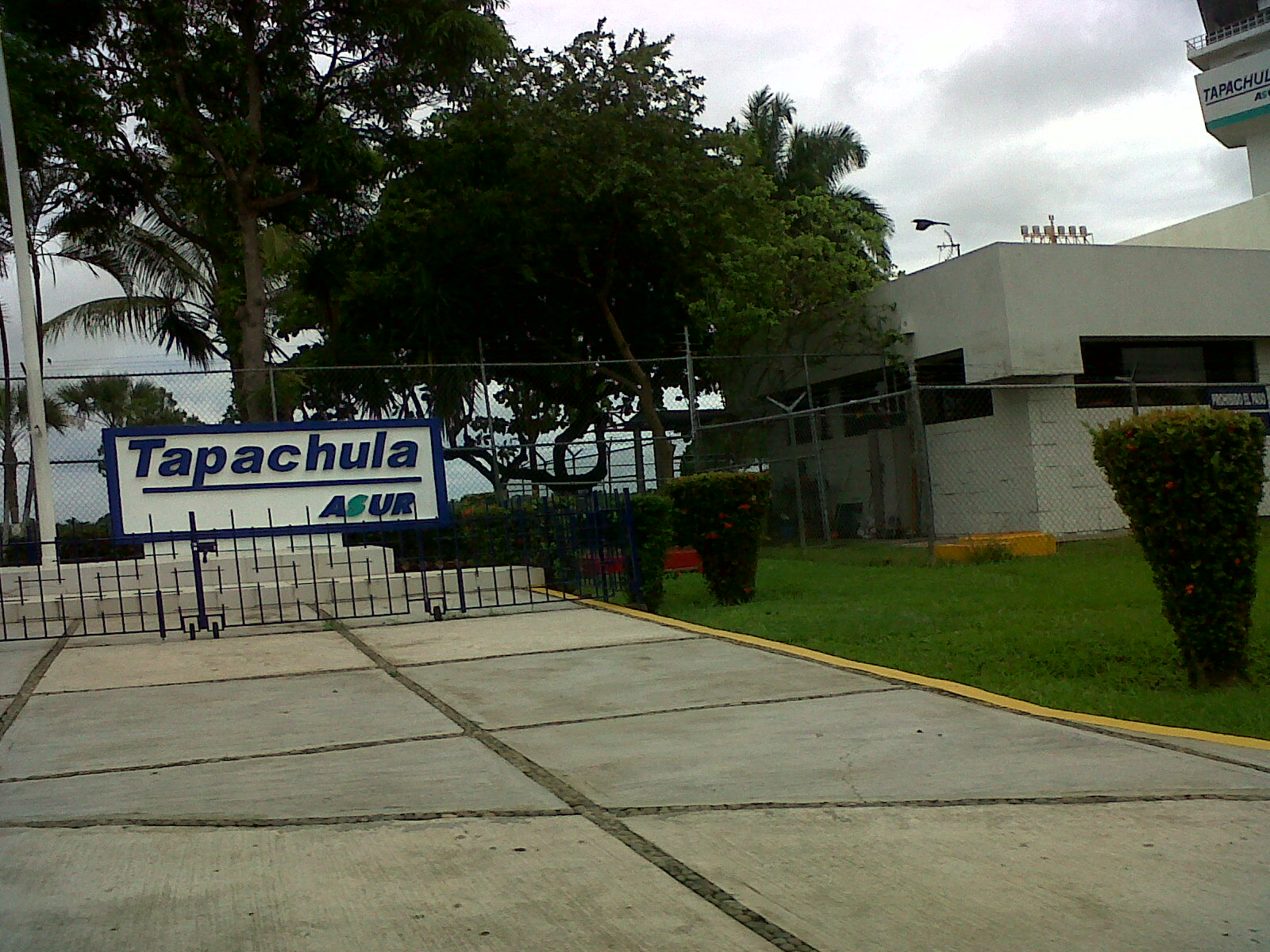
Main entrance to the administration building

=== Passenger ===
Airlines	Destinations
Aeroméxico	Mexico City–Benito Juárez
Aeroméxico Connect	Mexico City–Benito Juárez
Viva	Monterrey
Volaris	Guadalajara, Mexico City–Benito Juárez, Tijuana

=== Destinations map ===
Destinations from Tapachula International Airport
Red = Year-round destination
Blue = Future destination
Green = Seasonal destination

== Statistics ==
=== Annual Traffic ===
Passenger statistics at TAP
Year	Total Passengers	change %
2000	234,308	Steady
2001	190,375	▼18.75%
2002	176,793	▼7.13%
2003	184,750	▲4.5%
2004	193,573	▲4.77%
2005	192,326	▼0.64%
2006	188,053	▼2.22%
2007	210,921	▲12.16%
2008	240,116	▲13.84%
2009	190,378	▼20.71%
2010	185,159	▼2.74%
2011	161,892	▼12.56%
2012	157,926	▼2.44%
2013	156,288	▼1.03%
2014	175,194	▲12.09%
2015	265,670	▲51.64%
2016	308,788	▲16.22%
2017	292,592	▼5.2%
2018	330,619	▲13.0%
2019	385,483	▲16.59%
2020	280,475	▼27.2%
2021	424,249	▲51.26%
2022	503,254	▲18.62%
2023	553,744	▲10.03%
2024	614,936	▲11.05%
2025	519,105	▼15.6%

=== Busiest routes ===
Busiest routes from TAP (Jan–Dec 2025)
Rank	Airport	Passengers
1	Mexico City, Mexico City	168,156
2	Tijuana, Baja California	35,116
3	Guadalajara, Jalisco	28,664
4	Monterrey, Nuevo León	22,420

== See also ==
- List of the busiest airports in Mexico
- List of airports in Mexico
- List of airports by ICAO code: M
- List of busiest airports in North America
- List of the busiest airports in Latin America
- Transportation in Mexico
- Tourism in Mexico
- Grupo Aeroportuario del Sureste
- Mexican Naval Aviation
