= Minatitlán International Airport =

International airport serving Minatitlán and Coatzacoalcos, Veracruz, Mexico

Minatitlán/Coatzacoalcos International Airport Aeropuerto Internacional de Minatitlán/Coatzacoalcos
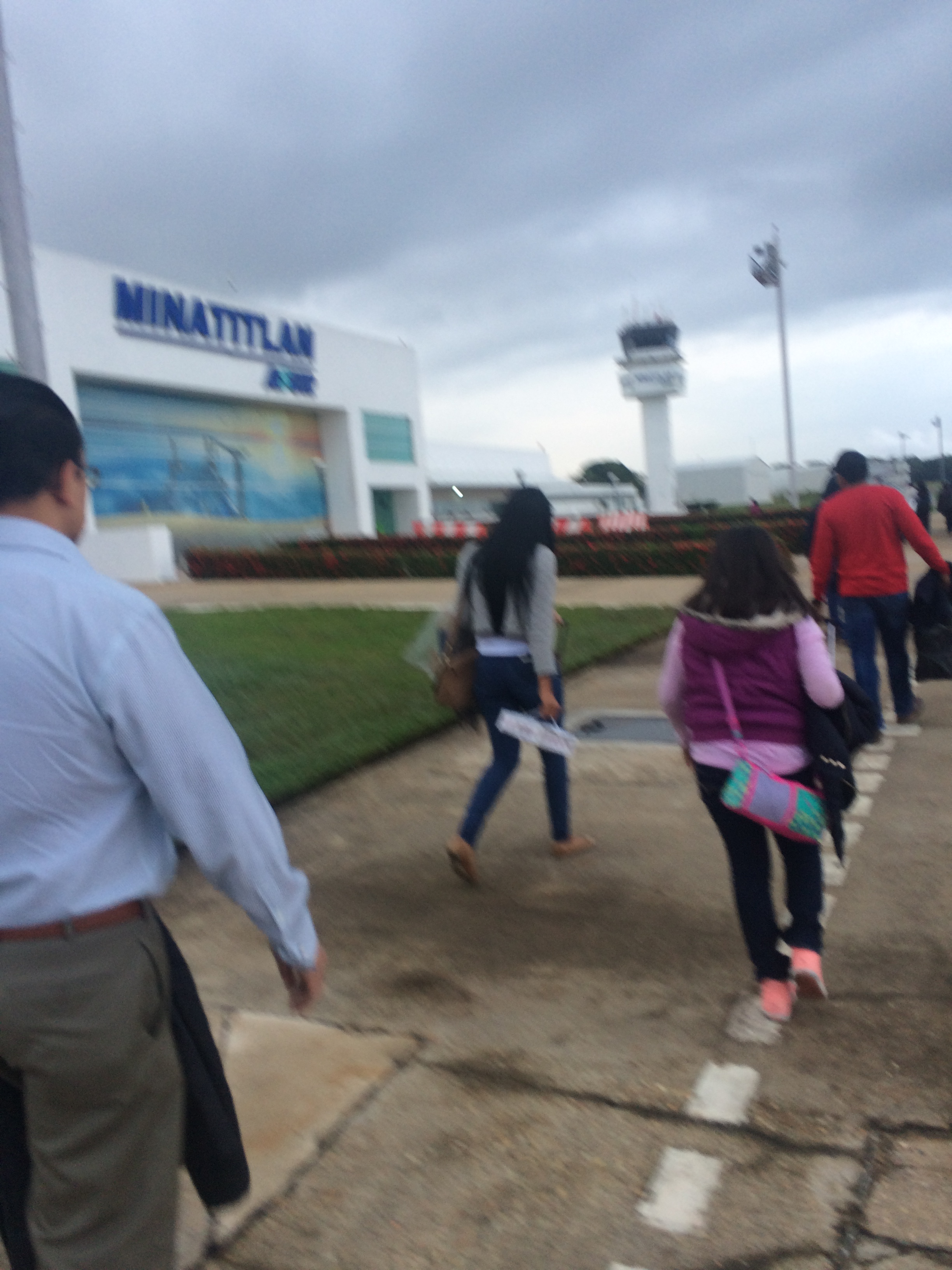
- IATA: MTT; ICAO: MMMT

Summary
- Airport type: Public
- Operator: Grupo Aeroportuario del Sureste
- Serves: Minatitlán and Coatzacoalcos, Veracruz, Mexico
- Location: Cosoleacaque, Veracruz, Mexico
- Time zone: CST (UTC-06:00)
- Elevation AMSL: 11 m / 36 ft
- Coordinates: 18°06′13″N 94°34′51″W
- Website: www.asur.com.mx/Contenido/Minatitlan/shopping

Map
- Location of airport in Veracruz MTT (Mexico)

Runways
| Direction | Length | | Surface |
| Direction | m | ft | Surface |
|---|---|---|---|
| 01/19 | 2,100 | 6,890 | Asphalt |

Statistics (2025)
- Total passengers: 157,913
- Ranking in Mexico: 50th ▼1
- Source: Grupo Aeroportuario del Sureste

Minatitlán International Airport (Spanish: Aeropuerto Internacional de Minatitlán); also known as Minatitlán/Coatzacoalcos International Airport (IATA: MTT, ICAO: MMMT) is an international airport located in Cosoleacaque, Veracruz, Mexico. It serves domestic flights for both Minatitlán and Coatzacoalcos metropolitan areas, as well as the southern Veracruz region. The airport also supports various executive and general aviation activities. Operated by Grupo Aeroportuario del Sureste (ASUR), the airport handled 152,545 passengers in 2024, increasing to 157,913 in 2025.

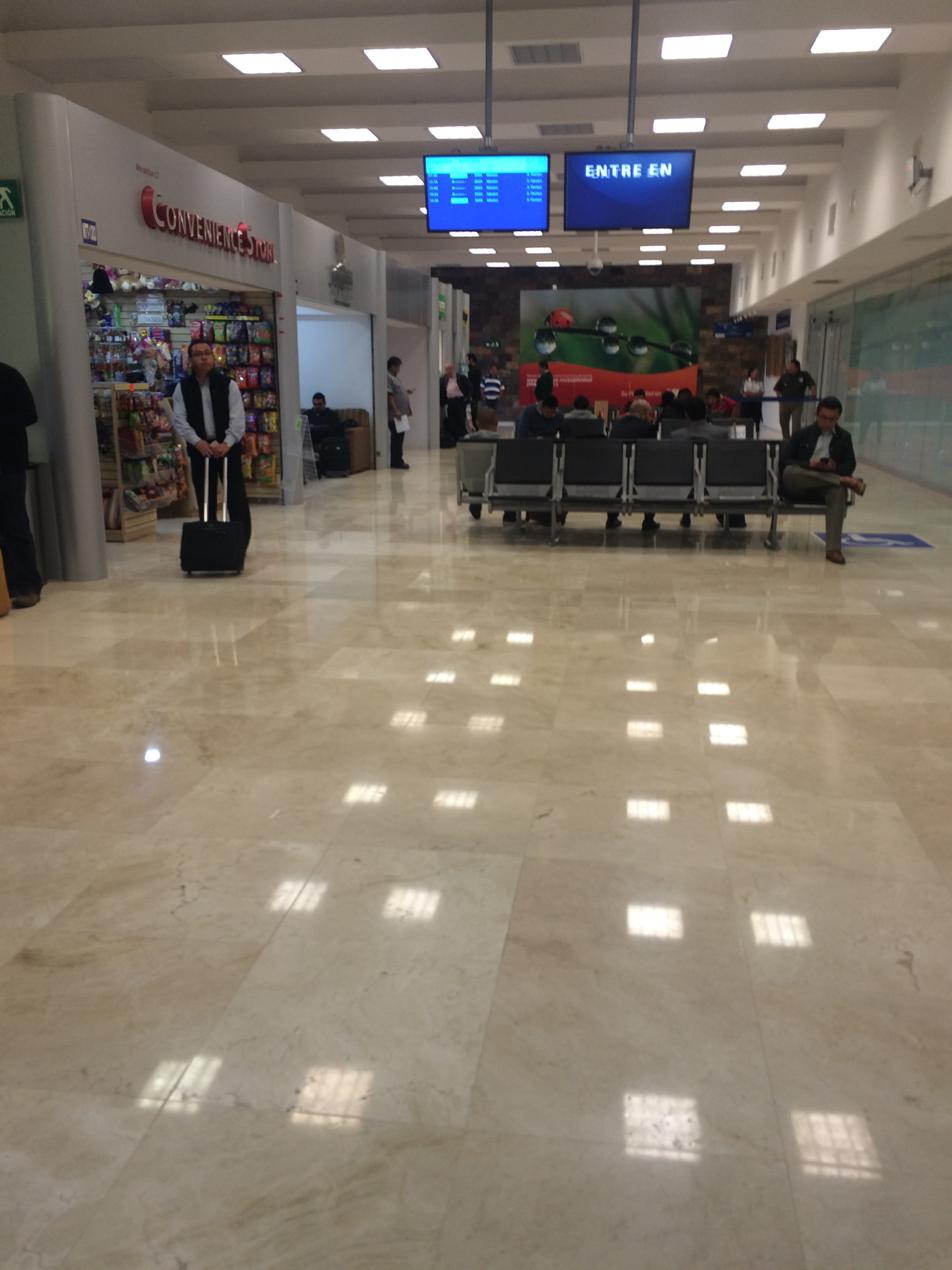
Departures concourse

== Facilities ==
The airport is situated at an elevation of 11 metres (36 ft) above mean sea level, featuring a single asphalt runway, designated as 01/19, measuring 2,100 metres (6,900 ft). The commercial aviation apron features four parking positions for narrow-body aircraft and additional stands for general aviation. The airport can handle up to 20 operations per hour.

The passenger terminal caters to both domestic arrivals and departures in a single-story structure. It includes check-in areas, a security checkpoint, a baggage claim area, and an arrivals hall with car rental services, taxi stands, and several retail stores. The departures concourse includes a VIP lounge and two gates with direct access to the apron, allowing passengers to board their planes by walking to the aircraft. Adjacent facilities include parking areas, civil aviation hangars, administration offices, courier and logistic facilities, and facilities for general aviation.

Air Force Station No. 7 (Spanish: Estación Aérea Militar No. 7) (E.A.M. No. 7) is a facility of the Mexican Air Force located on the airport's grounds. It does not have active squadrons assigned. It has an aviation platform of 6,500 square metres (70,000 sq ft), 1 hangar, and other facilities for the accommodation of Air Force personnel.

== Airlines and destinations ==
=== Passenger ===
| Airlines | Destinations |
|---|---|
| Aeromexico Connect | Mexico City–Benito Juárez |

== Statistics ==
=== Annual Traffic ===
Passenger statistics at Minatitlán International Airport
| Year | Total Passengers | change % |
| 2000 | 150,404 | Steady |
| 2001 | 131,229 | ▼12.74% |
| 2002 | 126,009 | ▼3.97% |
| 2003 | 130,900 | ▲3.88% |
| 2004 | 126,497 | ▼3.36% |
| 2005 | 146,485 | ▲15.80% |
| 2006 | 171,890 | ▲17.34% |
| 2007 | 188,877 | ▲9.88% |
| 2008 | 159,138 | ▼15.74% |
| 2009 | 145,956 | ▼8.28% |
| 2010 | 120,975 | ▼17.11% |
| 2011 | 108,521 | ▼10.29% |
| 2012 | 133,235 | ▲22.77% |
| 2013 | 174,885 | ▲31.26% |
| 2014 | 234,749 | ▲34.23% |
| 2015 | 256,431 | ▲9.23% |
| 2016 | 233,242 | ▼9.04% |
| 2017 | 201,219 | ▼13.7% |
| 2018 | 196,786 | ▼2.2% |
| 2019 | 148,159 | ▼24.7% |
| 2020 | 70,295 | ▼52.6% |
| 2021 | 98,544 | ▲40.2% |
| 2022 | 112,018 | ▲13.7% |
| 2023 | 142,118 | ▲26.9% |
| 2024 | 152,545 | ▲7.3% |
| 2025 | 157,913 | ▲3.5% |

== See also ==
- List of the busiest airports in Mexico
- List of airports in Mexico
- List of airports by ICAO code: M
- List of busiest airports in North America
- List of the busiest airports in Latin America
- Transportation in Mexico
- Tourism in Mexico
- Grupo Aeroportuario del Sureste
- Petroleum industry in Mexico
