= Cozumel International Airport =

International airport in Cozumel, Quintana Roo, Mexico

Cozumel International Airport Aeropuerto Internacional de Cozumel
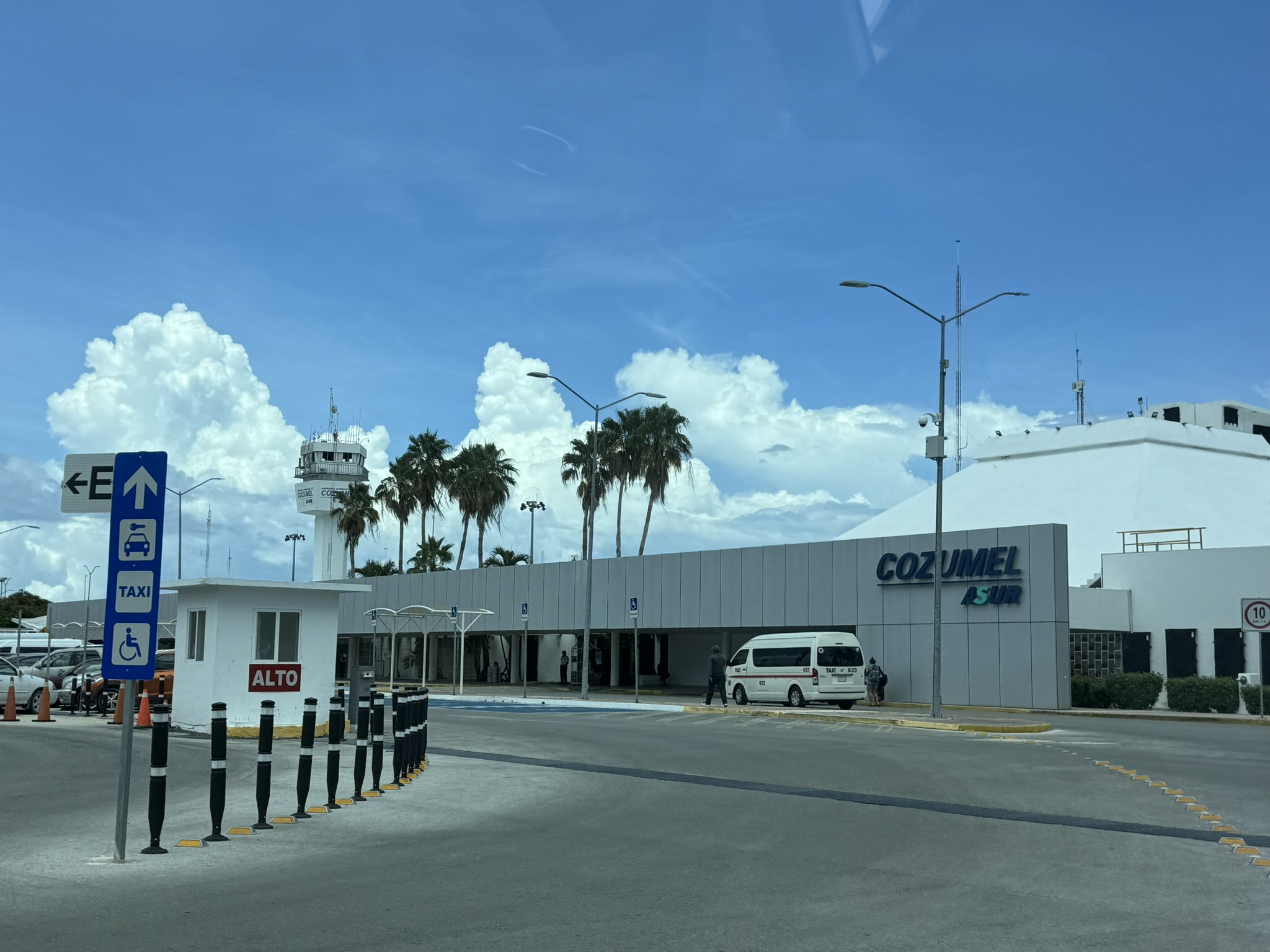
- IATA: CZM; ICAO: MMCZ

Summary
- Airport type: Military/Public
- Operator: Grupo Aeroportuario del Sureste Source: Grupo Aeroportuario del Sureste
- Serves: Cozumel, Quintana Roo, Mexico
- Time zone: EST (UTC-05:00)
- Elevation AMSL: 4.6 m (15 ft)
- Coordinates: 20°30′54″N 86°55′44″W
- Website: cozumelairport.net

Map
- Location of the airport in the Cozumel Island CZM (Quintana Roo) CZM (Mexico)

Runways
Direction	Length		Surface
Direction	m	ft	Surface
12/30	2,700	8,858	Asphalt
05/23 *	3,098	10,165	Asphalt

Statistics (2025)
- Total passengers: 646,606
- Ranking in Mexico: 35th ▼3
- Military use only

Cozumel International Airport (Spanish: Aeropuerto Internacional de Cozumel) (IATA: CZM, ICAO: MMCZ) is an international airport in the Caribbean island of Cozumel, Quintana Roo, Mexico. It handles national and international air traffic for the city of San Miguel, Cozumel and serves as a year-round secondary gateway for Mexican Caribbean and Riviera Maya tourism. The largest airport in the region is Cancún International Airport located in mainland Quintana Roo about 60 kilometres (37 mi) to the north of Cozumel.

As with the other nine airports in the Mexican southeast region, Cozumel Airport is operated by the Grupo Aeroportuario del Sureste ASUR. From 1978 to 2002, the airport was the headquarters and a hub for the regional airline AeroCozumel, a subsidiary of Mexicana. In 2024, the airport handled 712,958 passengers, and 646,606 passengers in 2025 according to Grupo Aeroportuario del Sureste. Additionally, Cozumel Airport is among the Top 15 largest in Mexico for international passenger traffic.

== Facilities ==
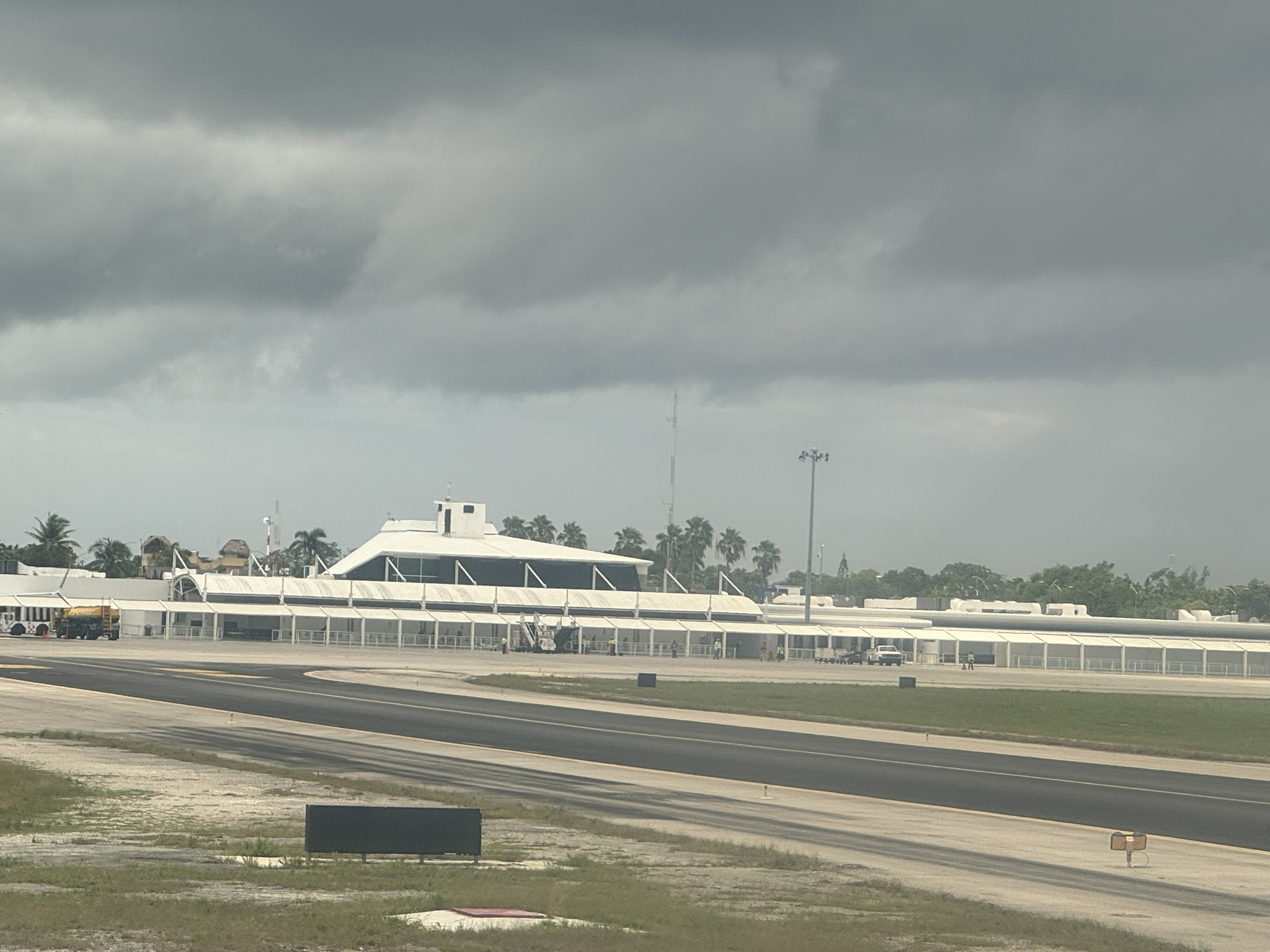
Airside of the airport.

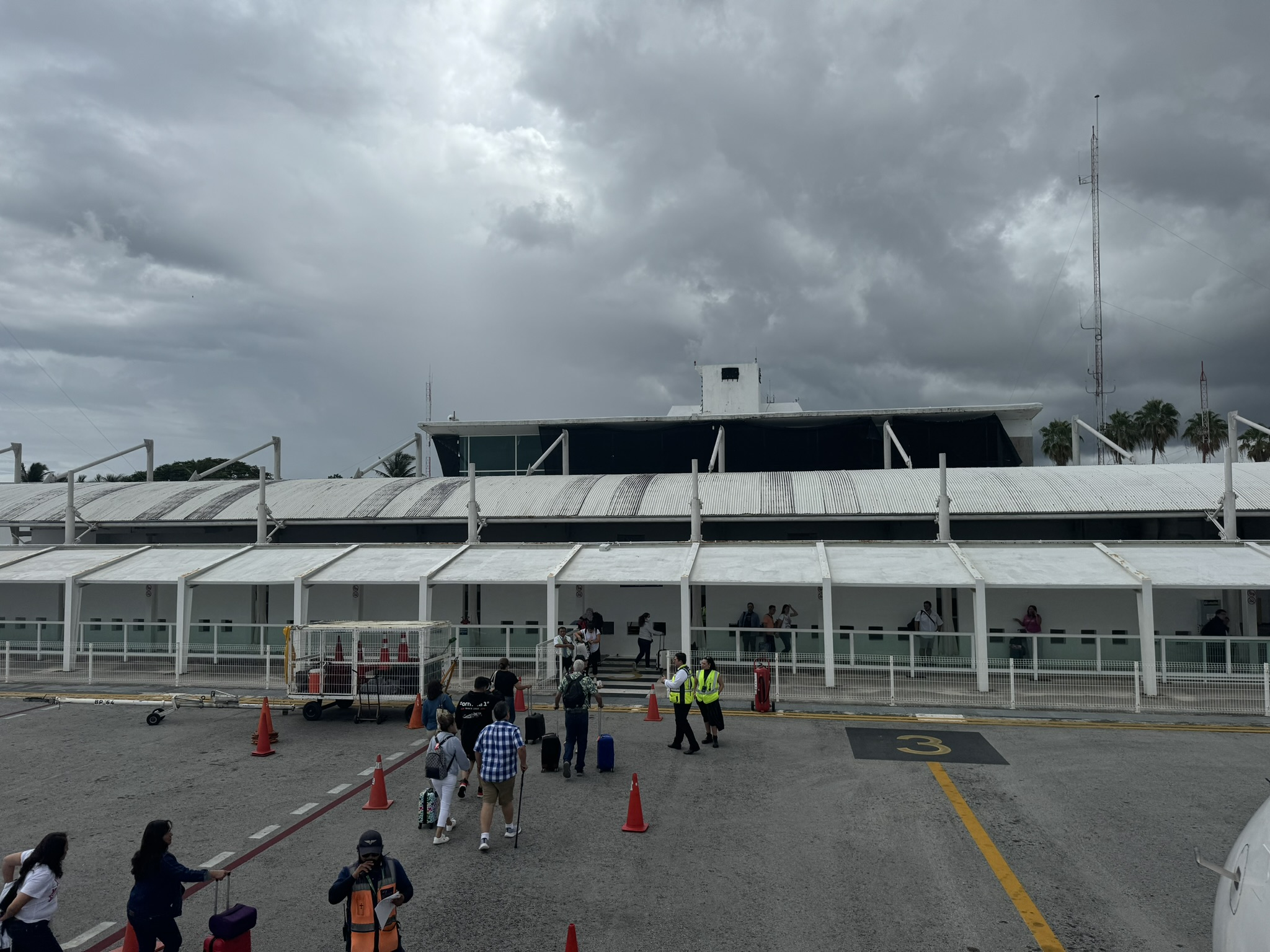
Airside of the airport.

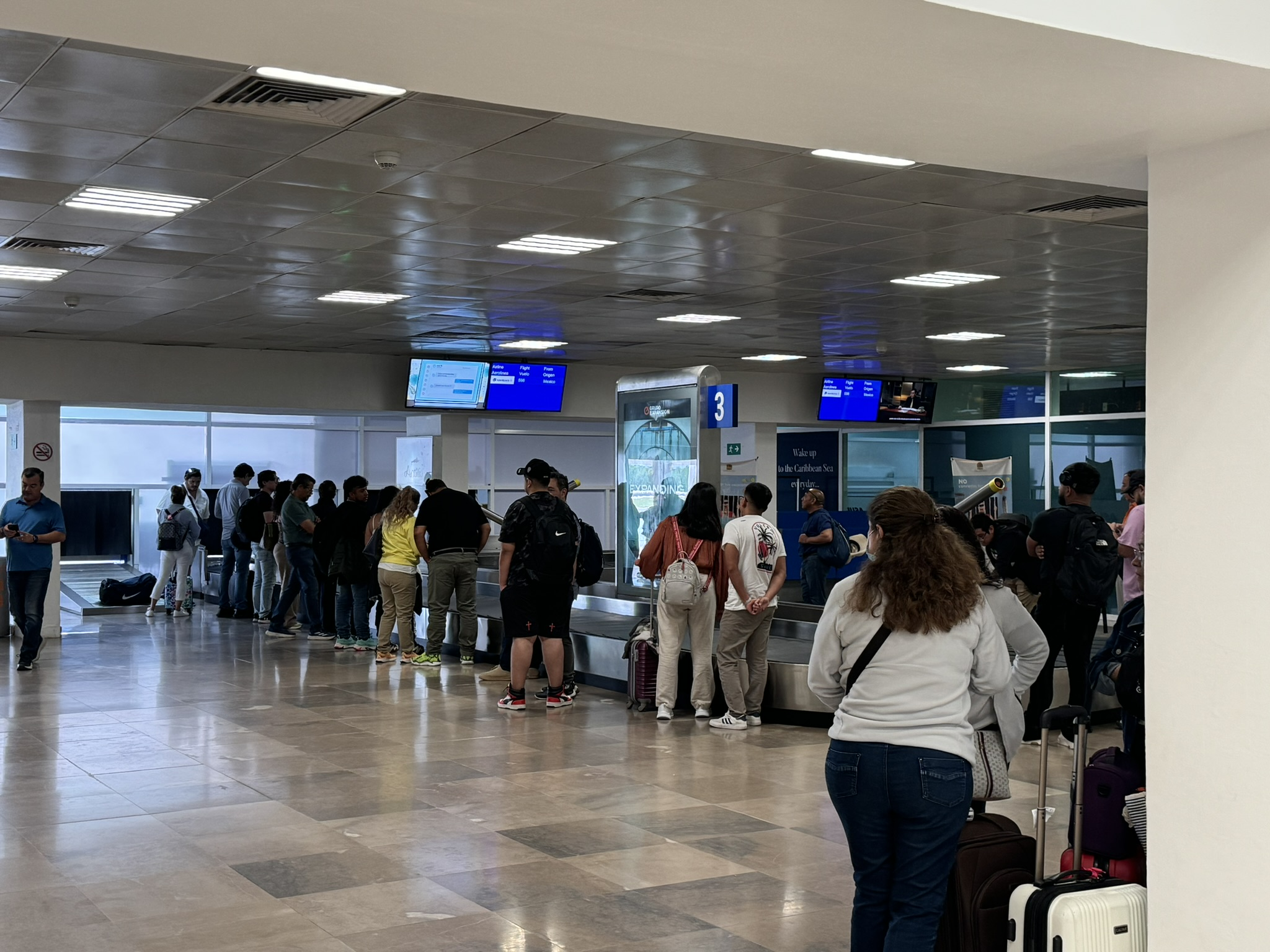
Domestic baggage claim at the airport.

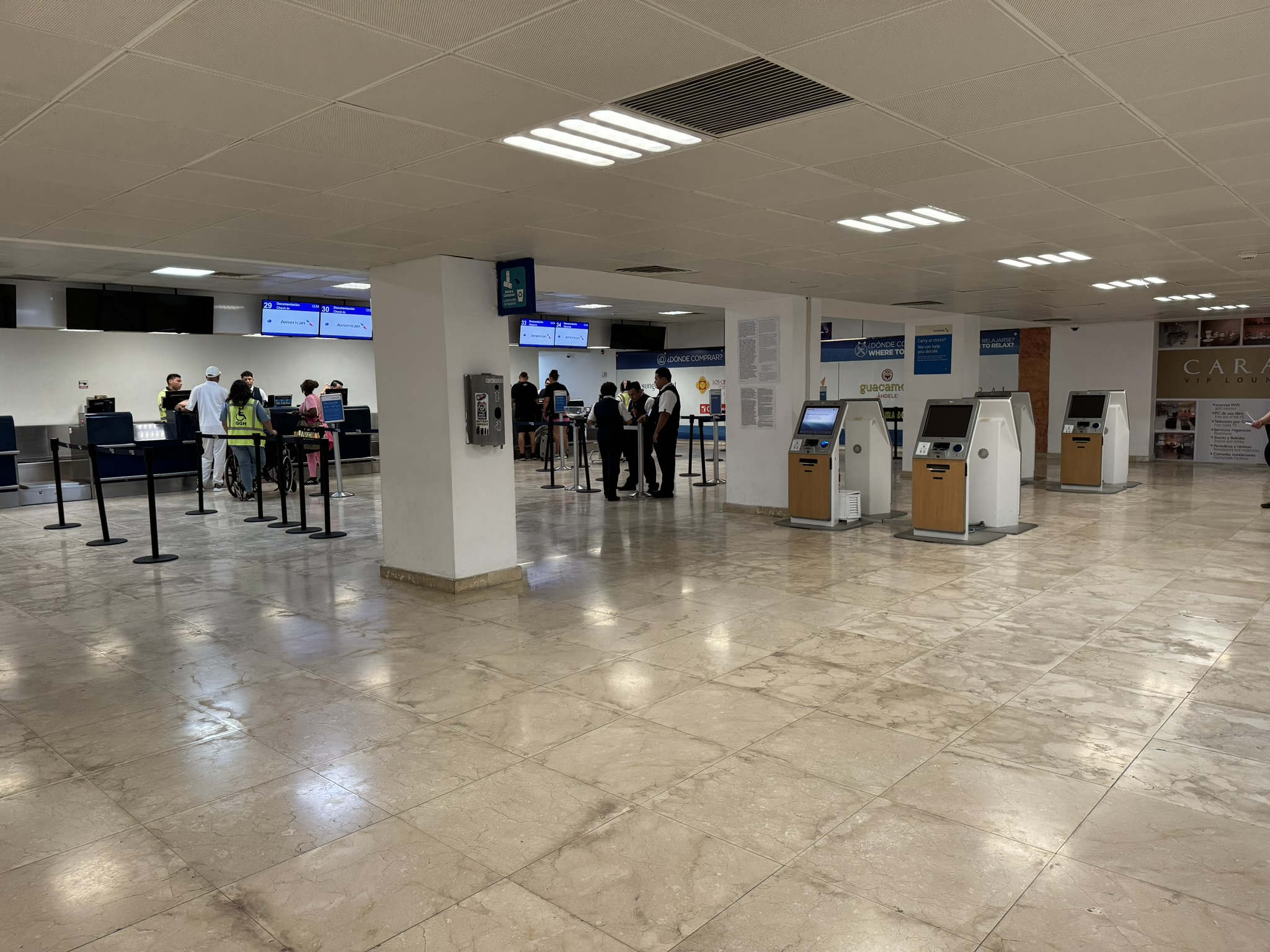
Check in counters at the airport.

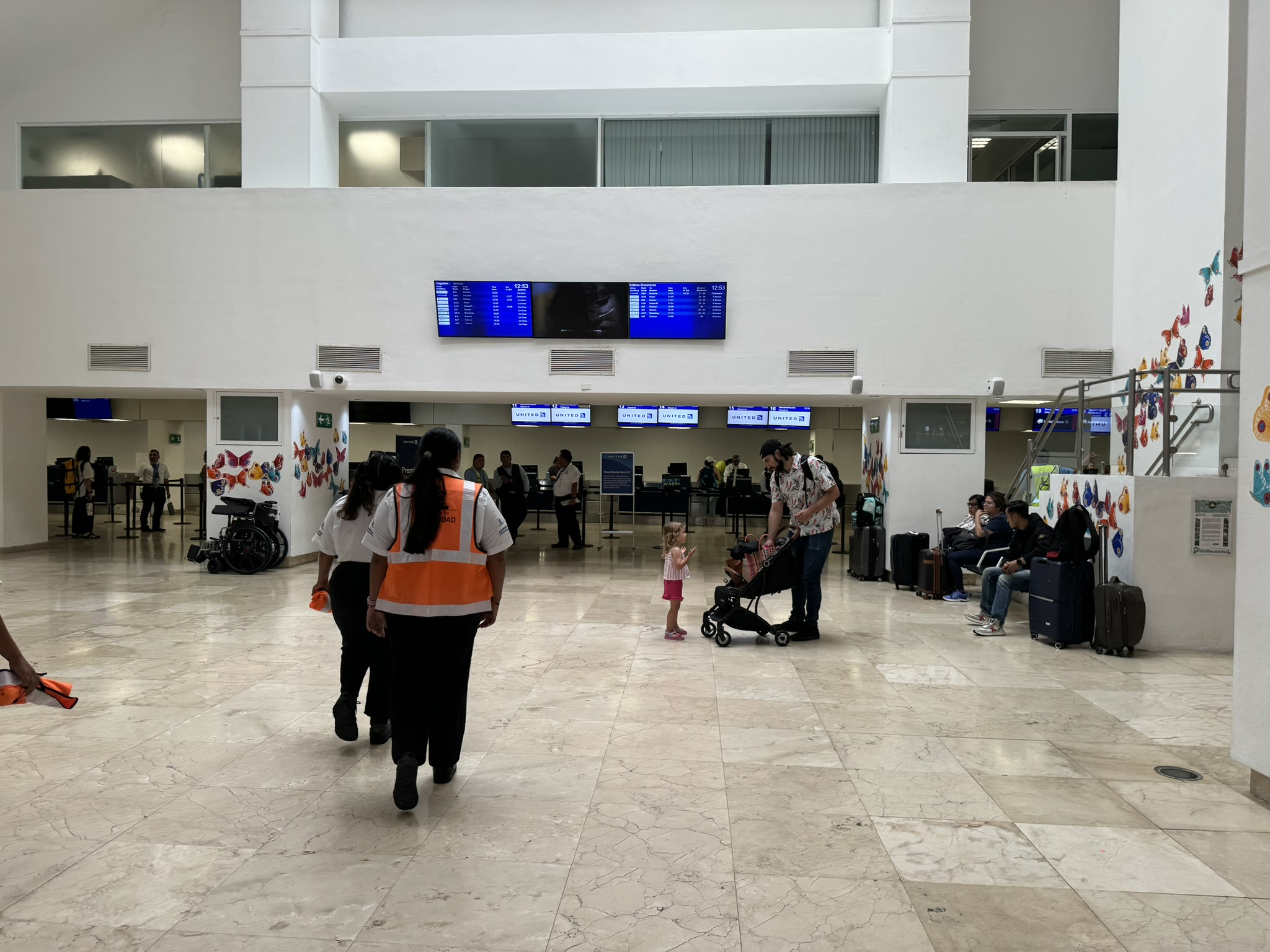
Main corridor at the airport.

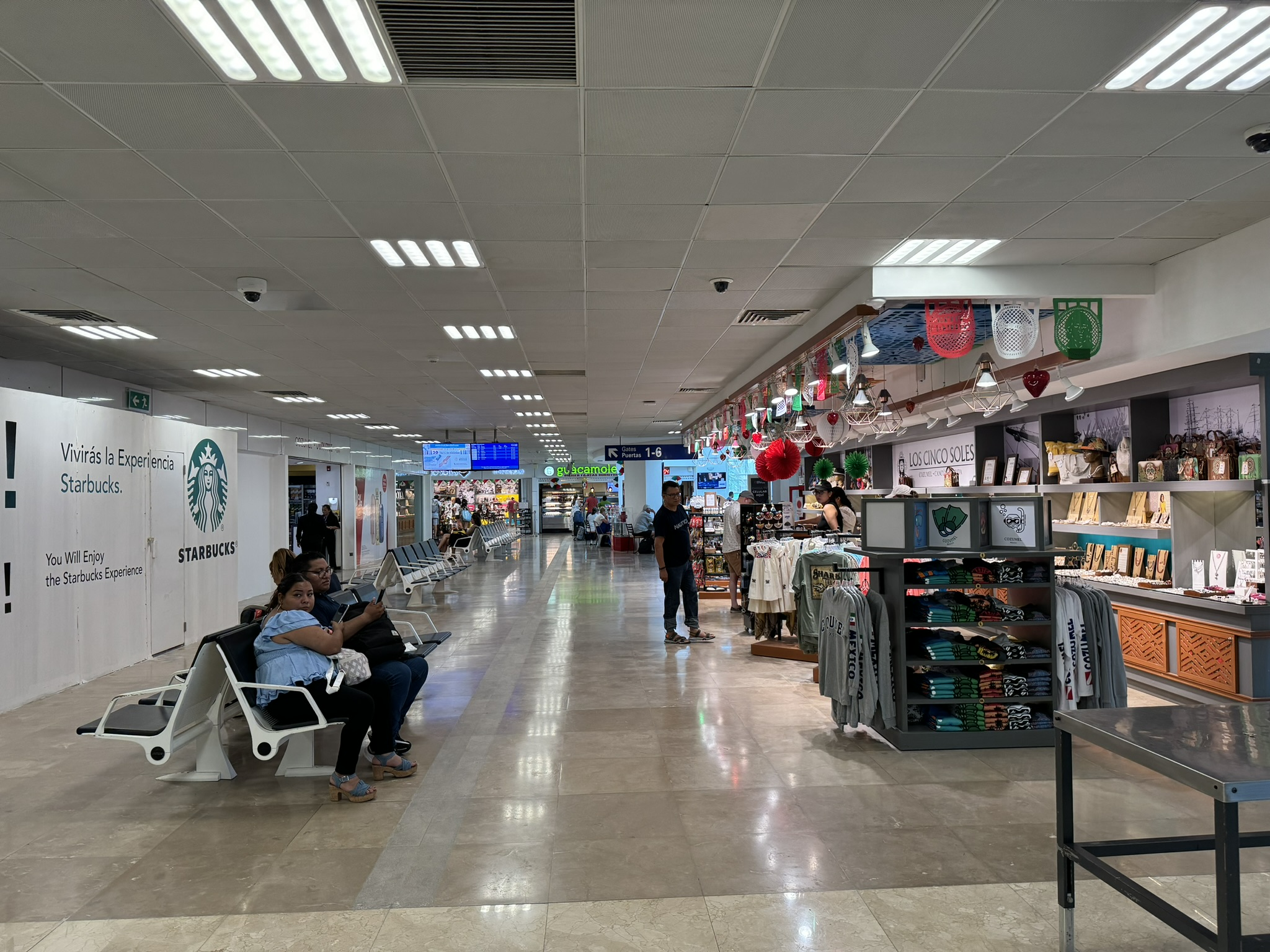
Shops at the airport.

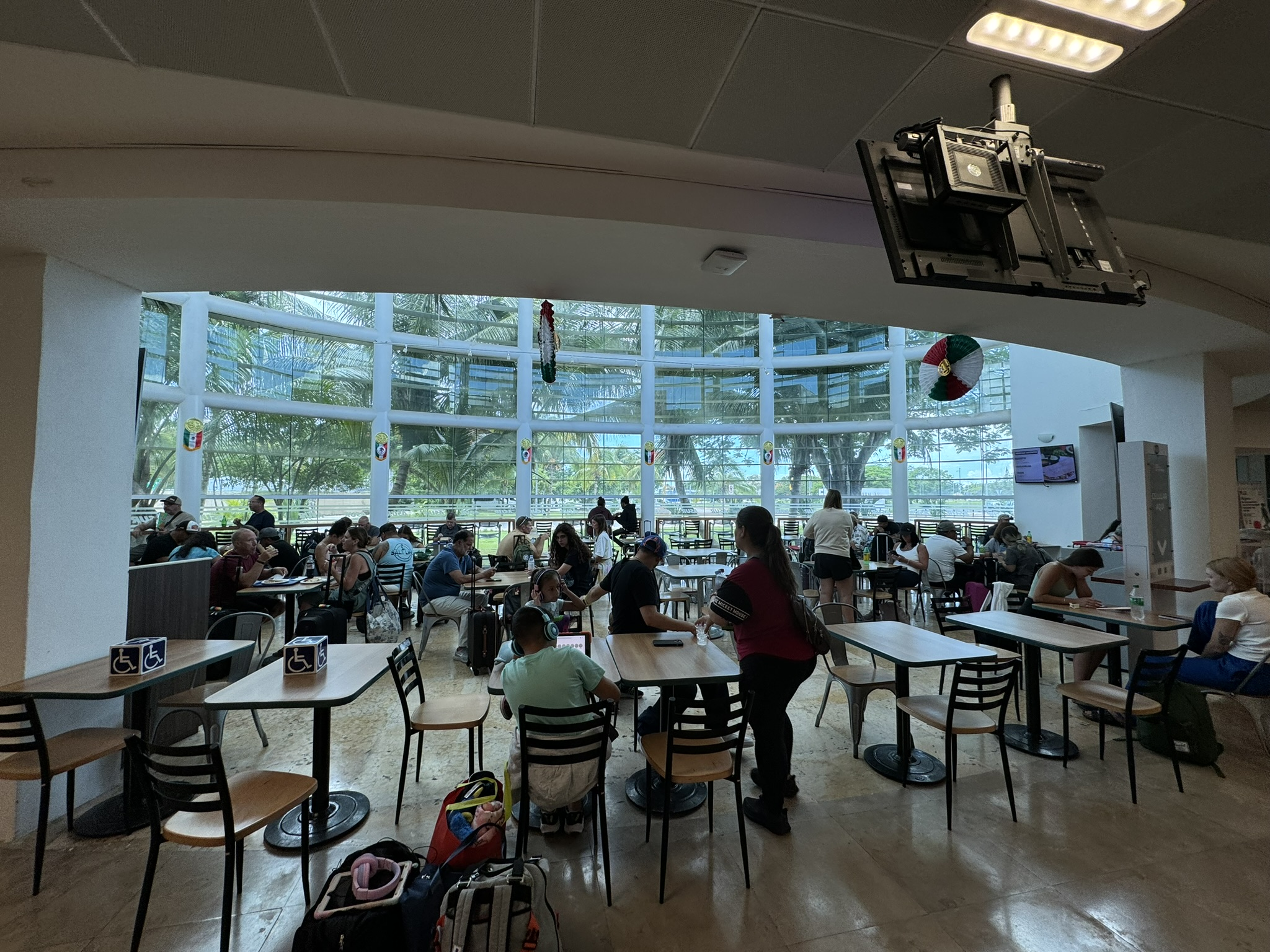
Fast food area at the airport..

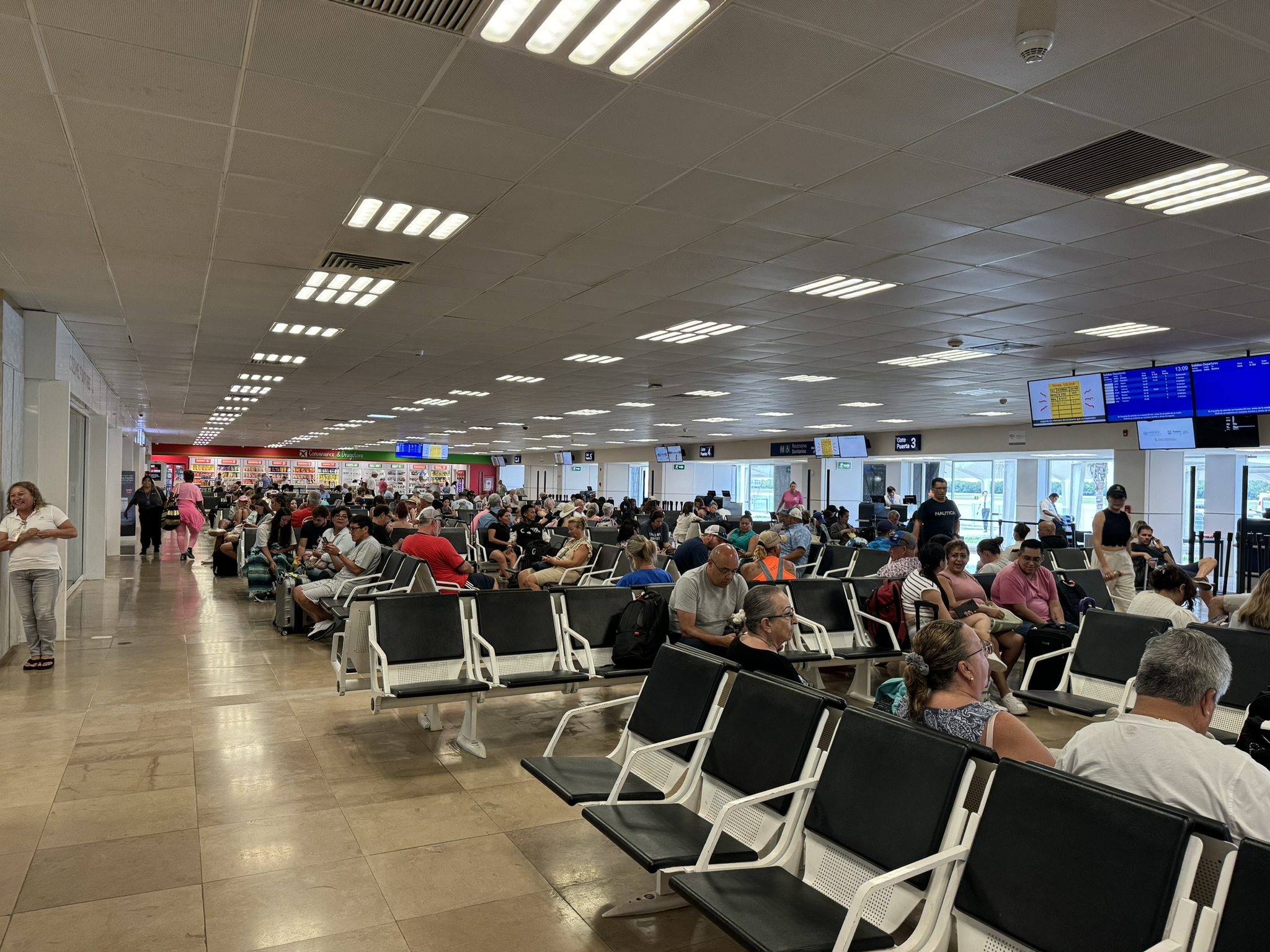
Last waiting rooms at the airport.

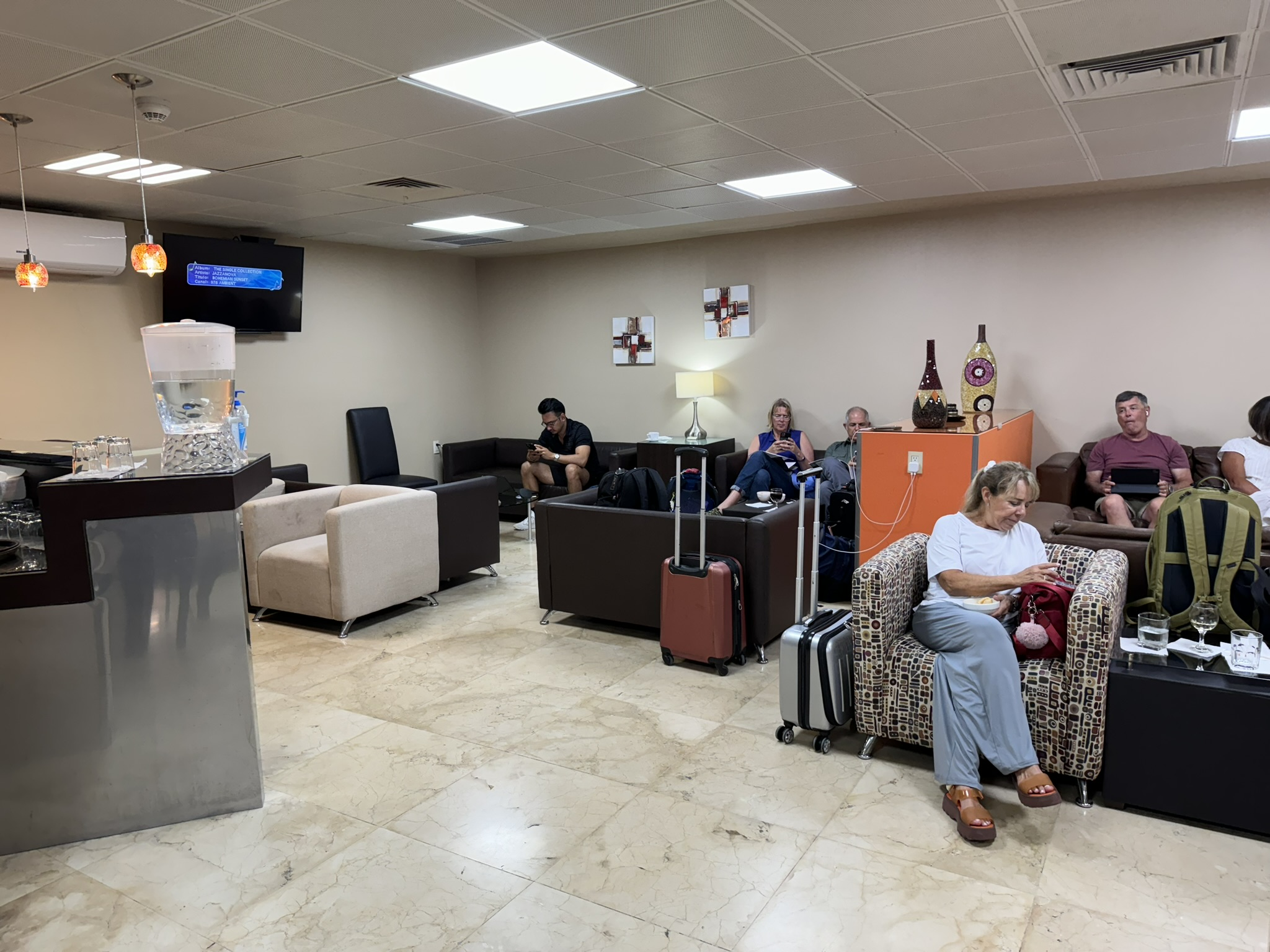
Caral VIP Lounge at the airport.

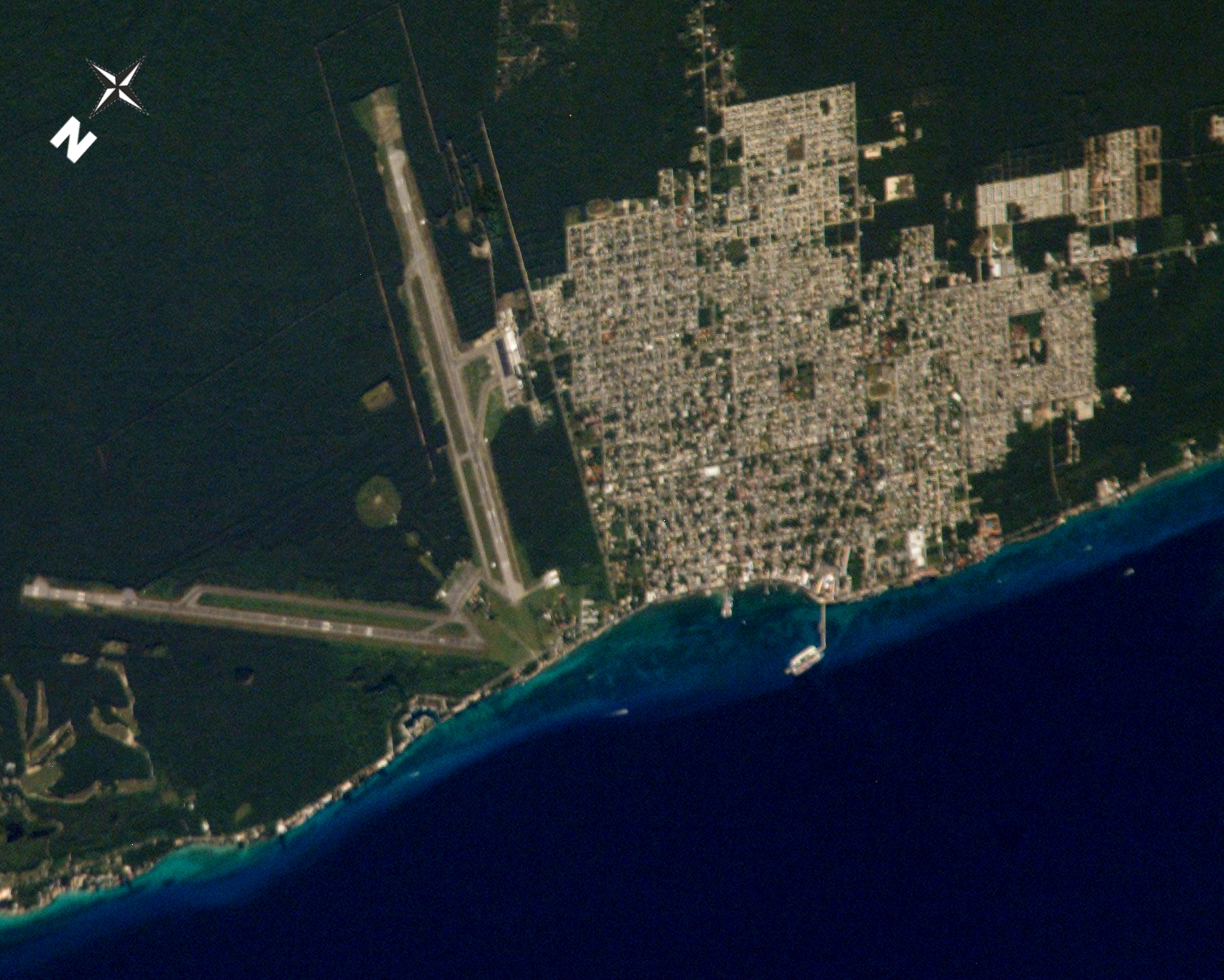
Satellite image showing the location of the airport relative to San Miguel de Cozumel

The airport is situated at an elevation of 15 feet (4.6 m) above mean sea level. It has a terminal area of 9,514 square metres (102,410 sq ft), an ICAO classification of 4D, and two runways. Runway 12/30 is 2,700 metres (8,900 ft) long and runway 05/23 is 2,500 metres (8,200 ft) long. The airport has the capacity to receive Boeing 767 aircraft and conduct 22 operations per hour. The apron has 6 aircraft stands, which are either of type C (6 positions) or a combination of 4 type C and 1 type D. All these stands are used for aircraft disembarkation.

The passenger terminal features 8 boarding gates. Of these, 6 gates are allocated for international flights, and 2 gates for domestic flights. Additionally, the terminal offers all the services that an international airport typically provides, including a VIP lounge. Parking, taxis, and car rental are available at the airport. Additionally, Cozumel Airport is also used for charter flights, executive and general aviation.

Cozumel Airport also functions as the Air Force Base No. 4 (Spanish: Base Aérea Militar No. 4 General Eduardo Aldasoro Suárez) (B.A.M. 4) of the Mexican Air Force, which, in addition to using runway 05/23, has an aviation platform measuring 2,550 square metres (27,400 sq ft) with 5 parking positions, 2 heliports, and a small hangar. This air base is the home of Squadron 201, which participated in World War II and currently operates T-6C+ aircraft.

== Airlines and destinations ==
=== Passenger ===
Airlines	Destinations
Aeroméxico	Mexico City–Benito Juárez
Aeroméxico Connect	Mexico City–Benito Juárez
Air Canada	Seasonal: Montréal–Trudeau, Toronto–Pearson
Air Transat	Seasonal: Montréal–Trudeau
American Airlines	Dallas/Fort Worth; Seasonal: Charlotte, Chicago–O'Hare
American Eagle	Miami
Delta Air Lines	Seasonal: Atlanta, Minneapolis/St. Paul
Neos	Seasonal: Milan–Malpensa (begins December 24, 2026)
Sun Country Airlines	Seasonal: Minneapolis/St. Paul
United Airlines	Houston–Intercontinental; Seasonal: Chicago–O'Hare, Denver
Viva	Monterrey
Volaris	Mexico City–Benito Juárez
WestJet	Montréal–Trudeau; Seasonal: Calgary, Toronto–Pearson

=== Destination maps ===
Domestic destinations from Cozumel International Airport
Red = Year-round destination
Blue = Future destination
Green = Seasonal destination
International destinations from Cozumel International Airport
Red = Year-round destination
Blue = Future destination
Green = Seasonal destination

== Statistics ==
=== Annual Traffic ===
Passenger statistics at CZM
Year	Total Passengers	change %
2000	600,337	Steady
2001	565,166	▼5.85%
2002	445,886	▼21.10%
2003	455,831	▲2.23%
2004	584,444	▲28.21%
2005	486,616	▼16.73%
2006	370,712	▼23.81%
2007	511,043	▲37.85%
2008	525,469	▲2.82%
2009	435,679	▼17.08%
2010	438,832	▲0.72%
2011	441,692	▲0.65%
2012	460,483	▲4.25%
2013	449,871	▼2.30%
2014	514,528	▲14.37%
2015	553,776	▲7.62%
2016	538,092	▼2.83%
2017	541,598	▲0.7%
2018	579,719	▲7.04%
2019	546,423	▼5.7%
2020	268,290	▼50.9%
2021	531,675	▲98.2%
2022	663,270	▲24.2%
2023	677,503	▲2.1%
2024	712,958	▲5.2%
2025	646,606	▼9.3%

=== Busiest routes ===
Busiest routes from CZM (Jan–Dec 2025)
Rank	Airport	Passengers
1	Mexico City, Mexico City	113,366
2	Dallas/Fort Worth, United States	55,696
3	Houston–Intercontinental, United States	47,355
4	Miami, United States	21,280
5	Atlanta, United States	15,330
6	Monterrey, Nuevo León	13,012
7	Minneapolis/St Paul, United States	12,675
8	Toronto–Pearson, Canada	11,502
9	Denver, United States	6,057
10	Charlotte, United States	6,018

== See also ==
- List of the busiest airports in Mexico
- List of airports in Mexico
- List of airports by ICAO code: M
- List of busiest airports in North America
- List of the busiest airports in Latin America
- Transportation in Mexico
- Tourism in Mexico
- Grupo Aeroportuario del Sureste
- List of beaches in Mexico
- Riviera Maya
- Mexican Air Force
