= Corraleja =

Colombian bullfighting festival

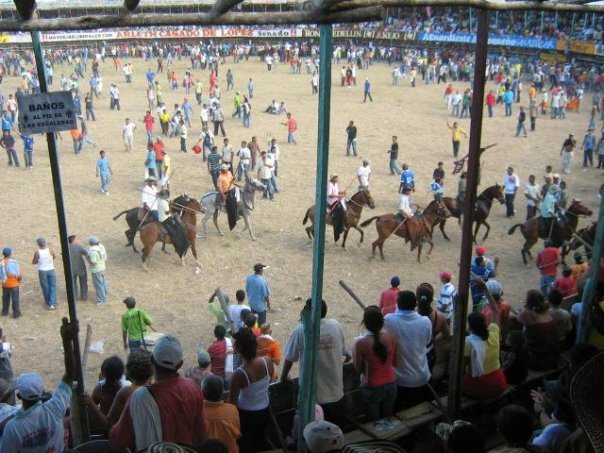
- Genre: Bullfighting
- Location: Caribbean region of Colombia

A corraleja is a bullfighting festival in the Caribbean region of Colombia. In this type of event, the public is invited to engage the bulls in the ring. Compared to a Spanish-style bullfight, the bulls are not killed after the fight, and the event is much less formal.
