= Corozal, Sucre =

- Municipality and town
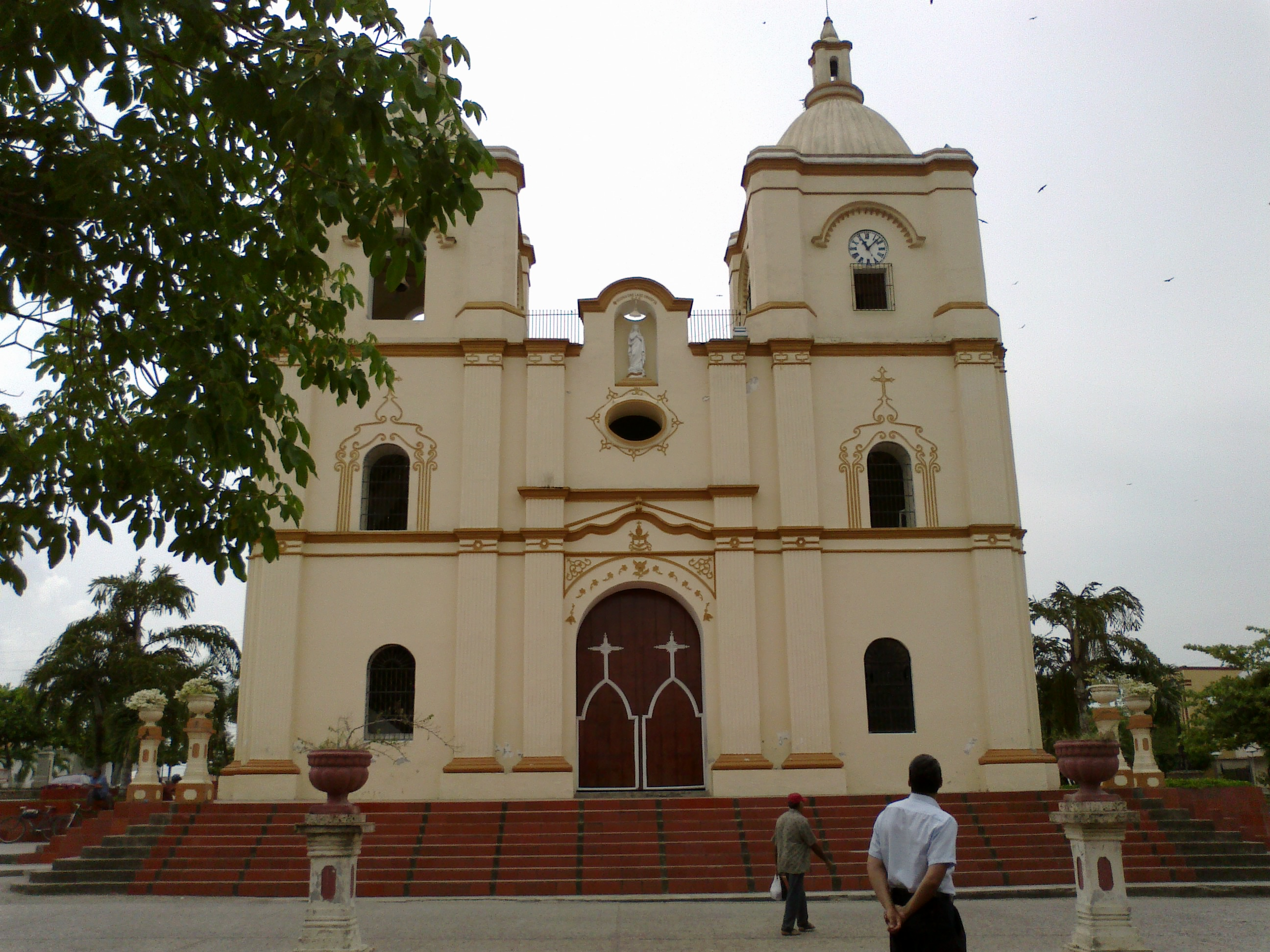

- Flag Coat of arms

- Location of the municipality and town of Corozal, Sucre in the Sucre Department..

- Location in Colombia
- Coordinates: 9°19′04″N 75°17′45″W
- Country: Colombia
- Department: Sucre Department

Government
  - Mayor: Bairon Ospina

Area
  - Municipality and town: 285.9 km^{2} (110.4 sq mi)
  - Urban: 4.81 km^{2} (1.86 sq mi)
- Elevation: 142 m (466 ft)

Population (2023 census)
  - Municipality and town: 70,591
  - Density: 246.9/km^{2} (639.5/sq mi)
  - Urban: 52,855
  - Urban density: 11,000/km^{2} (28,500/sq mi)
- Demonym: Corozalero
- Time zone: UTC-5 (Colombia Time)
- Area code: 57 + 5
- Website: Official website (in Spanish)

Corozal (Spanish pronunciation: [koɾoˈsal]) is a town and municipality in the Sucre Department, northern Colombia.

== Transportation ==
Corozal is served by Las Brujas Airport.

== Notable people ==
- José Serpa (born 1979) professional cyclist

== Climate ==
Climate data for Corozal (Las Brujas Airport), elevation 166 m (545 ft), (1981–2010)
Month	Jan	Feb	Mar	Apr	May	Jun	Jul	Aug	Sep	Oct	Nov	Dec	Year
Mean daily maximum °C (°F)	33.7 (92.7)	34.1 (93.4)	34.3 (93.7)	33.5 (92.3)	32.1 (89.8)	31.4 (88.5)	32.2 (90.0)	32.2 (90.0)	31.4 (88.5)	31.1 (88.0)	31.5 (88.7)	32.6 (90.7)	32.5 (90.5)
Daily mean °C (°F)	27.8 (82.0)	28 (82)	28.3 (82.9)	28.2 (82.8)	27.7 (81.9)	27.5 (81.5)	27.6 (81.7)	27.6 (81.7)	27 (81)	26.8 (80.2)	27 (81)	27.4 (81.3)	27.5 (81.5)
Mean daily minimum °C (°F)	22 (72)	22.6 (72.7)	23.2 (73.8)	23.6 (74.5)	23.2 (73.8)	22.9 (73.2)	22.7 (72.9)	22.6 (72.7)	22.5 (72.5)	22.6 (72.7)	22.5 (72.5)	22.1 (71.8)	22.7 (72.9)
Average precipitation mm (inches)	18.1 (0.71)	19.6 (0.77)	35.3 (1.39)	91.6 (3.61)	150.1 (5.91)	137.1 (5.40)	138.7 (5.46)	140.5 (5.53)	139 (5.5)	135 (5.3)	85.9 (3.38)	36.9 (1.45)	1,127.9 (44.41)
Average precipitation days (≥ 1.0 mm)	2	3	3	9	14	12	11	13	13	13	9	4	105
Average relative humidity (%)	76	76	76	78	82	83	82	82	84	84	83	80	80
Mean monthly sunshine hours	235.6	203.3	186	144	142.6	168	189.1	176.7	135	148.8	153	204.6	2,086.7
Mean daily sunshine hours	7.6	7.2	6	4.8	4.6	5.6	6.1	5.7	4.5	4.8	5.1	6.6	5.7
Source: Instituto de Hidrologia Meteorologia y Estudios Ambientales
