= Margarita Island (Colombia) =

Island in the Magdalena River, Colombia

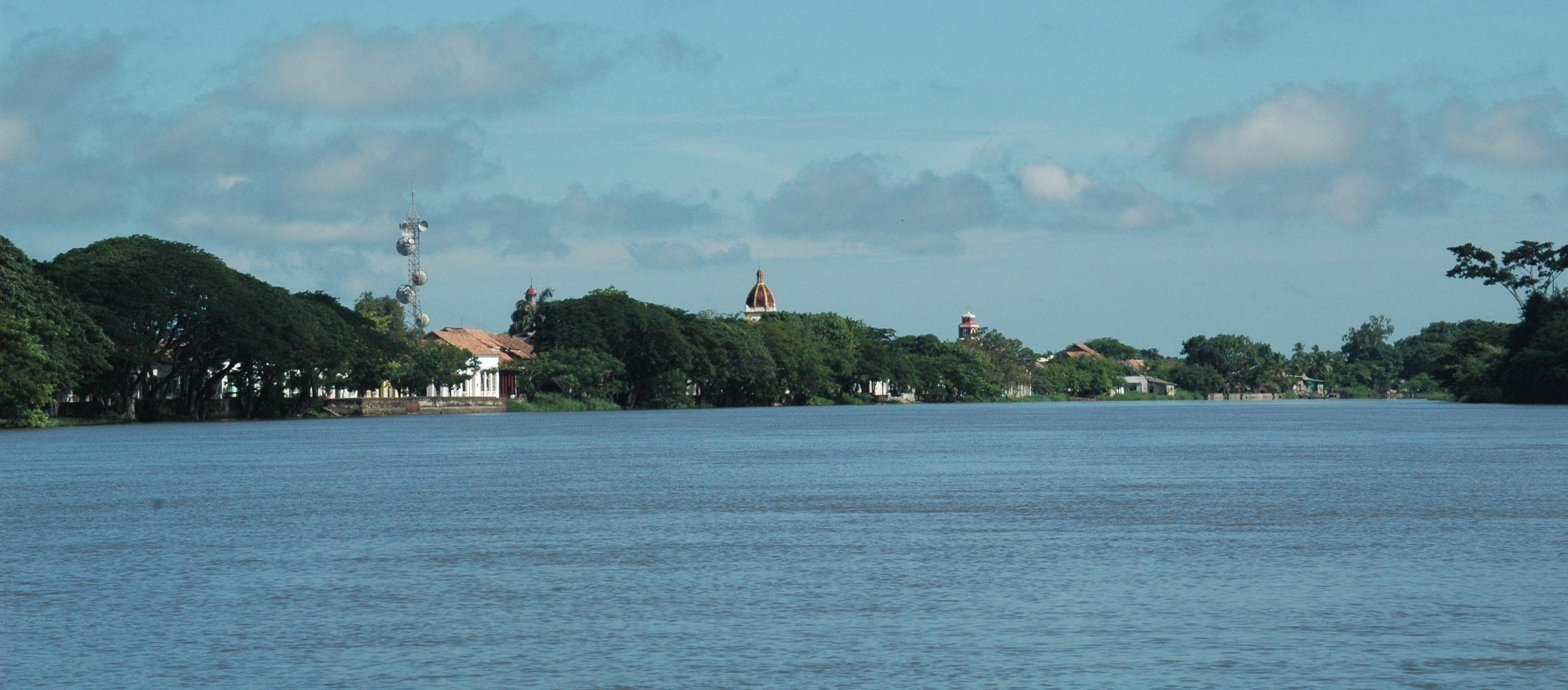

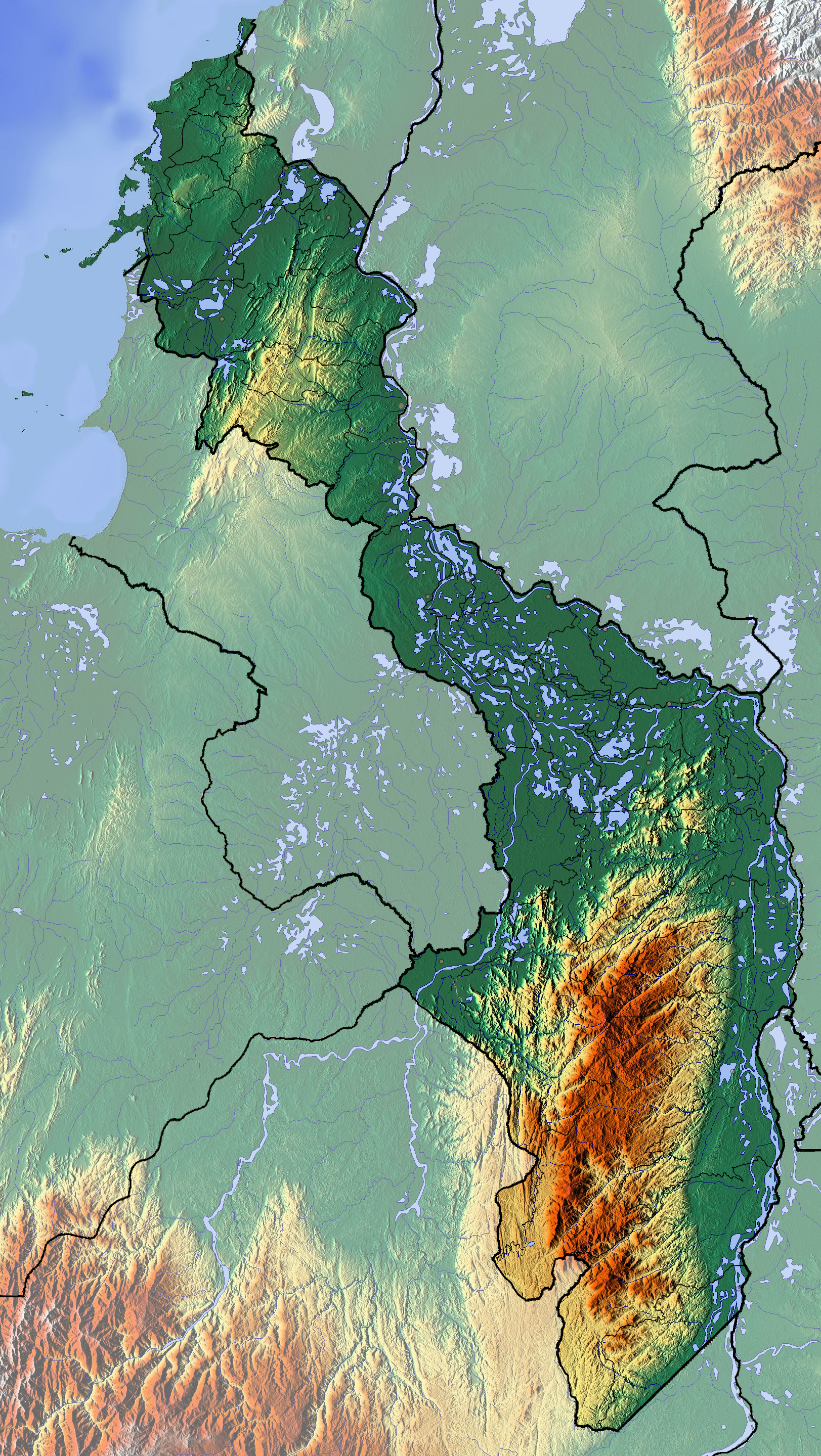
- Location within Bolívar Department Location within Colombia
- Interactive map of Margarita Island

Geography
- Location: Magdalena River
- Coordinates: 9°05′02″N 74°30′00″W
- Area: 2,200 km^{2} (850 sq mi)

Administration
- Colombia
- Department: Bolívar Department

Margarita Island (Spanish: Isla Margarita), also called Mompox Island (Spanish: Isla Mompox), is an inland river island in the Magdalena River, near Mompos town of interior Colombia. It is located in the Bolivar Department, on the border with the Magdalena Department in northern Colombia. With an area of 2100 to 2200 km^{2}, it is the largest island in Colombia and the fourth largest river island in the world after the islands of Marajo, Bananal and Tupinambarana (all in Brazil). It had a population of 117,210 in 2008.

== Geography ==
Margarita Island is located in the deposit basin Depresión Momposina. It is 40 km wide and 90 km long and almost rectangular, the area of the island changes with the tides. The island is located at the mouth of the rivers Cauca and Magdalena. The highest point on the island is 20 metres (65 ft 7 1/2 in).

There are small swamps on the island: Ciénaga Bochica, Ciénaga Pajaral, Ciénaga De Lona, Ciénaga El Medio, Ciénaga Ancon, Ciénaga Florida, Ciénaga Grande, Ciénaga Robles, Ciénaga El Uvero, Ciénaga El Cacao, Ciénaga El Cucharal, Ciénaga El Palmar or Ciénaga Gualamito. There are other river islands nearby.

== Administrative divisions ==
Margarita Island is divided into six municipalities: Santa Cruz de Mompox, it contains more than a third of the island's territory and three-sevenths of its population, is the economic center of the island, the other five: Talaigua Nuevo, San Fernando, Margarita, Hatillo de Loba and Cicuco, which together form a sub-region of the department Depresión Momposina Bolivarense,

In 2008, the island had about 117,000 inhabitants. Other places on the island Patico, Guasimal, Santa Rosa, Pinillos or La Victoria. On the mainland on north coast of the island is the city of Magangu, an important financial center of Bolívar. The town of El Banco is located to the east of the island. The department Magdalena is located immediately northeast of the island, the department Sucre to the west (5 km) and the department Cesar to the east 10 km.

== Flora and fauna ==
Island vegetation is dominated by mangroves and Capsicum frutescens.

The fish species found in the waters near the island belong to the family Gerreidae, the genus Polymixia, Beardfish, Mojarras and the species Prochilodus magdalenae.
