= La Mojana =

Region of wetlands in northern Colombia

Coordinates: 8°30′N 75°00′W

The 11 municipalities within La Mojana

La Mojana is a large area of wetlands in Colombia that functions as an inland river delta. It lies in the Momposina depression, and is fed by water from three rivers: the San Jorge, the Cauca, and the Magdalena. Administratively, it is divided between 11 municipalities from 4 departments. Distinct wet and dry seasons mean there are significant changes of water levels within La Mojana throughout the year, affecting the environment and human activities.

The area now known as La Mojana has likely been inhabited on and off for perhaps 4,000 years. The Zenú culture developed in the area and manipulated the waterways through means such as the construction of canals. The waterways continue to play an important role in modern times, shaping agriculture and livelihoods. Land use conflicts have emerged due to the shift of public land into private hands. Changes to the landscape have also affected the flow of water, damaging soil fertility while also increasing flood risk.

Today, the inhabitants of La Mojana are poorer than the Colombian average. A combination of challenges such as pollution, land use change, and climate change are exacerbating periods of drought and flooding. Restoration efforts aim to restore the ecological health of the area while allowing the continuation of farming.

== Location ==
La Mojana is an area of wetlands covering over 500,000 hectares (1,200,000 acres) in northern Colombia, encompassing 11 municipalities within the departments of Antioquia, Bolívar, Córdoba, and Sucre. This region lies within the low-lying Momposina depression. The area is considered part of the Caribbean region of Colombia.

The 11 municipalities are:

- Achí
- Ayapel
- Caimito
- Guaranda
- Magangué
- Majagual
- Nechí
- San Benito Abad
- San Jacinto del Cauca
- San Marcos
- Sucre

== Landscape ==
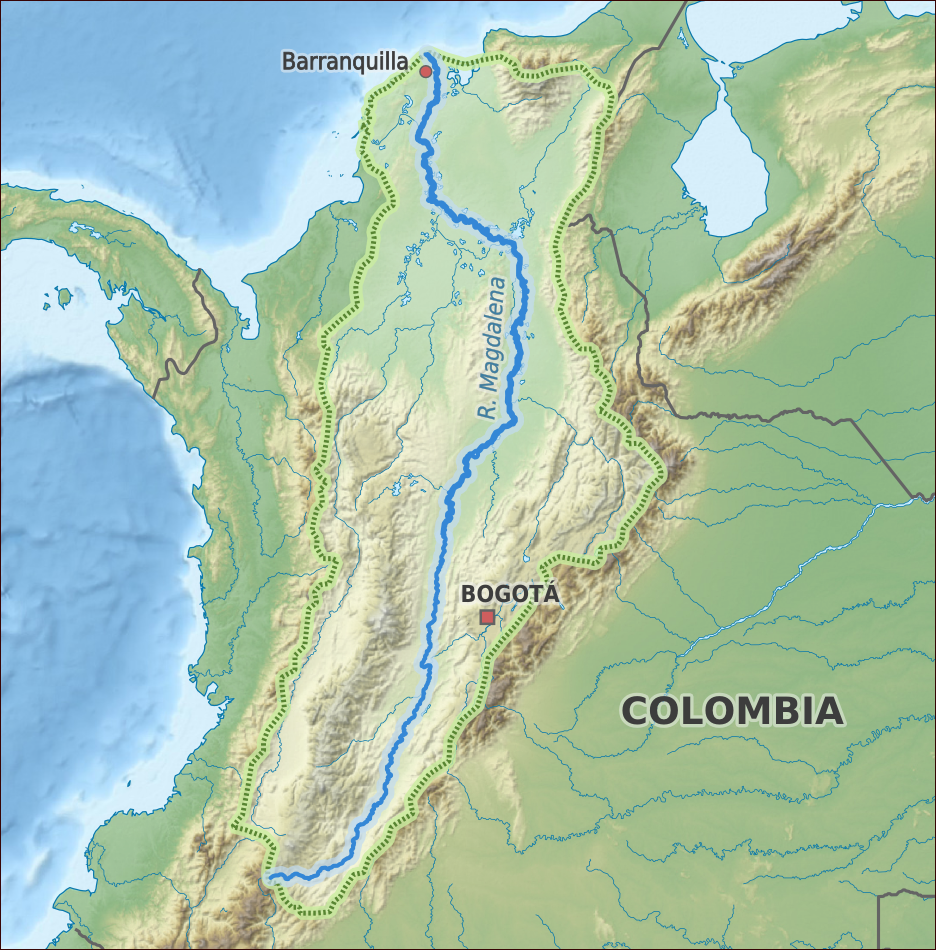
The drainage basin of the Magdalena River

The wetlands formed at the intersection of three rivers: the San Jorge, the Cauca, and the Magdalena. They play an important role in the rivers' hydrology. Permanent wetlands make up 21% of La Mojana, while temporary wetlands make up another 21%. Much of the rest of the land is used for agriculture. As of 2018, agriculture took up 131,200 hectares (324,000 acres). The aquifer underneath La Mojana from which groundwater can be extracted is part of a 12,672-square-kilometre-wide (4,893 sq mi) system.

La Mojana has a network of wetland areas, including marsh, swamps, and river channels. The largest swamp is the Ayapel swamp. These wetlands weaken the impact of flooding and trap sediments flowing down the rivers. The whole area serves as an inland river delta, and during the wet season rivers overflow into the surrounding areas. As the terrain is flat, floods, which can reach up to 7 metres (23 ft) deep, spread widely throughout the area. Land near the edge of marshes becomes the most fertile.

=== Climate ===
The climate is humid. There is an average temperature of 27.8 °C (82.0 °F). The average rainfall is 2,846.9 millimetres (112.08 in), with the most rain falling in the southeast. The dry season occurs from January to March. The area is exposed to the El Niño–Southern Oscillation, which during La Niña years can greatly damage agriculture in La Mojana. During warm phases, water levels are low, while during cold phases, the water levels increase.

=== Threats ===
The whole of La Mojana once functioned as a large floodplain. However, growing population has increased the demand for land, and thus increased land conversion. Floods have worsened as infrastructure has developed and reduced the landscape's soil permeability and thus its water retention capacity. Soil permeability has also been reduced by growing herds of cattle, which remove plant biomass and compress the ground beneath them, making soil less able to absorb flood water. Reduced soil absorption leads not only to flooding, but also to worse water scarcity during dry seasons.

While dams are used to prevent floods, they also interfere with the natural flow of water within the ecosystem. Dams prevent new sediment from replenishing the fertility of now isolated land. They also perversely encourage further land conversion, which exacerbates flood challenges. When dams break, floods are extreme, and damage natural ecosystems and agricultural areas. There are 300 officially recorded flood events in total from 1998 to 2020. A 2021 flood in the Cauca river caused by the breach of a bank in San Jacinto del Cauca affected at least 165,895 people from 37,000 families. Smaller floods occurred in other areas of La Mojana during 2022 and 2023. The 2021 floods also affected 70,000 hectares (170,000 acres) of crops and 300,000 cattle. 2024 marked the fourth successive year of floods.

Climate change has led to altered weather patterns that have shifted growing seasons. It is expected to exacerbate both floods and droughts, while reducing water available for people and agriculture. Fish populations have decreased due to environmental changes, as well as due to overfishing. Large nets prevent fish from migrating, and small meshes mean fish do not survive until reproductive age.

The rivers are polluted from mining and agricultural runoff, both upstream and within La Mojana. Mercury, especially from gold mines along the Cauca river, is causing health issues for residents, either directly to miners or through its accumulation in fish meat. Tropical forests that once filled the area have been converted to use for crops and livestock. This pollution means that residents of La Mojana rely on groundwater, unlike other areas of Colombia. However, the pollution also brings some risk to groundwater quality, with some pollution present in shallow wells. Mangroves that used to fill the area have decreased. Some of this is due to deforestation. Illegal mining and deforestation increase sedimentation and pollution in the rivers, exacerbating floods and making the water more dangerous.

=== Restoration ===
Efforts to restore the wetland have led to the development of the concept of "Agroecosistemas Biodiversos Familiares", where farms are managed in a way that contributes to ecological restoration and climate resilience. These farms use terrace cultivation and grow crops with some resistance to droughts and floods. Mangrove restoration efforts have reforested around 12,000 hectares (30,000 acres). Local communities have developed measures to promote fish sustainability, including closed seasons and gear restrictions. Some dam building has been hampered by corruption.

== Population ==
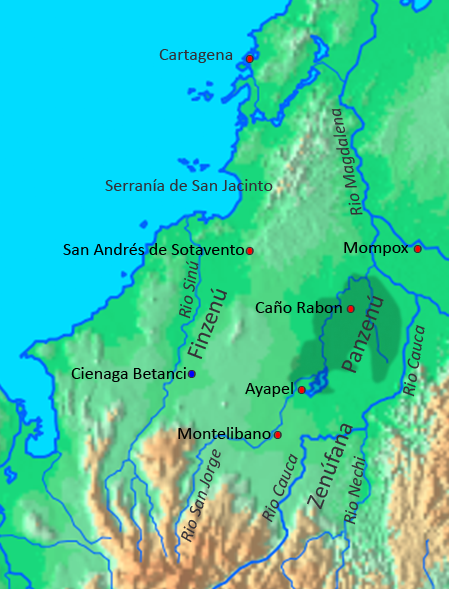
The historical area inhabited by people of the Zenú culture, which overlaps with La Mojana

Human presence in the area may go back 4,000 years. Early residents likely subsisted off root crops, before also beginning to farm corn. The Zenú culture developed in the area from around 1000 BC. Historically, the local population has been tightly entwined with the wetlands, managing the waterways to suit their needs. Pottery remains have been found from these early periods, and the Zenú also left an impact on the landscape through the construction of canals and other landscape modifications. This control of water flow was combined with slash-and-burn agriculture, allowing the area to support a large population. Climate change appears to have caused people to leave the area at around 1300, although it was later repopulated before the arrival of the Spanish.

Livestock ranching began to expand from around 1850. This saw the steady selling off of formerly common land to ranchers, who benefitted from the introduction of Urochloa mutica grass and Zebu cattle. The second half of the 20th century saw improvements in agricultural technology and a prioritization of agricultural output. Wetlands were drained and dammed to facilitate agriculture, and a highway was built through the area. Conflict over land increased, especially between large landowners and local residents more used to informal norms of land ownership.

The modern population is mestizo, with ancestry from indigenous populations and various immigrant groups. There are hundreds of villages in La Mojana. Inhabitants of the area are much poorer than the national average. Around 80% are considered in poverty, and almost half have limited access to clean drinking water. Rates of illiteracy are also above the national average, in common with other rural areas of the Caribbean region. As of 2022, the total population was 435,873. The population is expected to continue growing over the next few decades. The largest settlements are in drier areas. Property disputes have emerged as ranchers have gained private control of formerly public lands. Such land disputes have increased pressure on fisheries, as those unable to farm shift to fishing year-round.

Livelihoods of people in the area have historically been seasonal, reflecting the differing availability of natural resources. Plants such as Chrozophora tinctoria and Ambrosia peruviana are grown in the area, and are traditionally used as indicators of good rain. The Cecropia obtusifolia tree is similarly viewed as indicating oncoming storms. In 2016, a weather center was established that gathers local data on rainfall, temperature, and river flow. Daily weather bulletins are distributed via radio, WhatsApp, and text messages, which some farmers use to plan their crop planting. The large amounts of water during the wet season make the region amenable to rice cultivation, which has a strong presence in nine of La Mojana's municipalities. Rice is sown in two periods, the first period being the onset of rain after the dry season (from March to May), while the second period is from June to September. Different varieties of rice are grown, which can be harvested between 90 and 180 days after sowing. Generally, faster growing varieties are sown in the first planting period. The use of chemical fertilizers and pest control is increasing. Over half of rice produced is used for self-consumption. Other crops produced include maize, sorghum, cassava, yams, sesame, sugarcane, bananas, watermelon, squash, chili pepper, eggplant, and cucumber.

== Wildlife ==
The wetlands support a large number of species. The fish Prochilodus magdalenae migrates upstream away from La Mojana during the dry season. Other groups of animals found include capybara, caiman, rabbits, and turtles. Birds known to inhabit or have previously inhabited the area include the black-bellied whistling duck, the blue-winged teal, and the limpkin. Turtle species include Colombian wood turtles, scorpion mud turtles, and Trachemys callirostris.
