= Achí, Bolívar =

Achí
- Municipality and town
- Flag

- Location of the municipality and town of Achí in the Bolívar Department of Colombia

- Location in Colombia
- Coordinates: 8°34′N 74°33′W
- Country: Colombia
- Department: Bolívar Department

Area
  - Municipality and town: 1,471 km^{2} (568 sq mi)
- Elevation: 20 m (66 ft)

Population (2015)
  - Municipality and town: 23,051
  - Urban: 4,106
- Climate: Am

Achí (Spanish pronunciation: [aˈtʃi]) is one of the 46 municipalities of the Bolívar department in the Caribbean Region of Colombia. It is crossed by the Cauca River and borders the Sucre department in the so-called Momposina Depression.

The municipality of Achí is bordered by the municipality of Magangué to the north; the municipalities of Pinillos and Tiquisio to the east; the municipalities of Montecristo and San Jacinto del Cauca to the south; and the Sucre Department to the west with the municipalities of Majagual and Guaranda. Its economy is based on agriculture, livestock, and fishing.

The origins of Achí lie in the old town of Ojolargo, located where the present-day village of Mao is, some 6 km from what is now Achí. Ojolargo was founded on September 24, 1770, and in 1779 had 471 inhabitants. However, this village was short-lived as its inhabitants fled from a cholera epidemic that swept through in 1814 and began settling instead in Achí, where they found an abundance of the tropical fruit that bears the name of Achí. In 1815 the mayor of Majagual, Estanislao Huertas Lorenzana, ordered the transfer of the inhabitants of Ojolargo to the new village of Achi. In 1817 the formation of the town was completed, becoming part of the Canton of Majagual. On March 6, 1869, the village is destroyed by an earthquake. In 1934 Achí breaks away from the municipality of Majagual, thus becoming a new municipality, with its first mayor being Pedro Barragén Constantino. The municipalities of Montecristo, Bolívar and San Jacinto del Cauca segregate from Achí in 1994 and 1997, respectively.
