= San Cristóbal, Bolívar =

Municipality in Bolívar Department, Colombia

San Cristóbal
- Municipality
- Flag

- Location of the municipality and town of San Cristobal, Bolívar in the Bolívar Department of Colombia

- Location within Bolívar Department Location within Colombia
- Coordinates: 10°23′33″N 75°03′47″W
- Country: Colombia
- Department: Bolivar
- Subregion: Dique
- Established: November 30, 1995; 30 years ago

Government
  - Mayor: Carlos Manuel Julio Morales

Area
  - Total: 42.27 km^{2} (16.32 sq mi)
- Elevation: 7 m (23 ft)

Population (2018)
  - Total: 8,054
  - Density: 190.5/km^{2} (493.5/sq mi)
- Demonym: Sancristobano/a
- Time zone: UTC-5 (COT)
- Postal code: 131520

San Cristóbal is a municipality located in the Bolívar Department, northern Colombia. It is located on the south shore of the Dique Canal. As of the year 2018, it has a total population of 8,054.

== Geography ==
San Cristóbal is situated on the northern edge of Bolívar Department. Its average elevation is 7 meters above the sea level.
