= Coat of arms of Bolívar Department =

Coat of Arms representing the Department of Bolívar and its government

Coat of arms of Bolívar
- Armiger: The Department of Bolívar
- Crest: An eagle expansed holding a wreath of olives in its beak.
- Shield: Modern French bordure diminished argent, per fess, the chief per pale, Or a palm tree proper, gules five bezants, azure a sailboat proper, on stern the flag of Bolívar, on barry wavy argent and azure.
- Motto: Ab Ordine Libertas
- Other elements: Mantled Or.
- Use: Gubernatorial Flag, official paperwork.

The coat of arms of the Department of Bolívar is the official coat of arms of the Department of Bolívar. The coat of arms had been in used before 1856, but in that year the Sovereign State of Bolívar was created, and its symbols changed; the new coat of arms, would be the same as the coat of arms of Colombia but with a red oval around it, that read “ESTADO SOBERANO DE BOLIVAR”. In 1886 the states were suppressed and departments created instead, the symbols were used once again but the originals were corrupted and so there are some variations on the current coat of arms, and that which was specified on the blazon.

== Design and meanings ==
The shield is of a traditional shape in Spanish heraldry; it is of a squared form with a small appendage in the lower middle part. It is also tierced in a party per fess, in chief per pale manner, and fimbriated in argent.

It is crowned by a goshawk with a garland of olive, that rests upon the shield, with a scroll behind it, and is mantled in Or on the sides.

=== Divisions ===
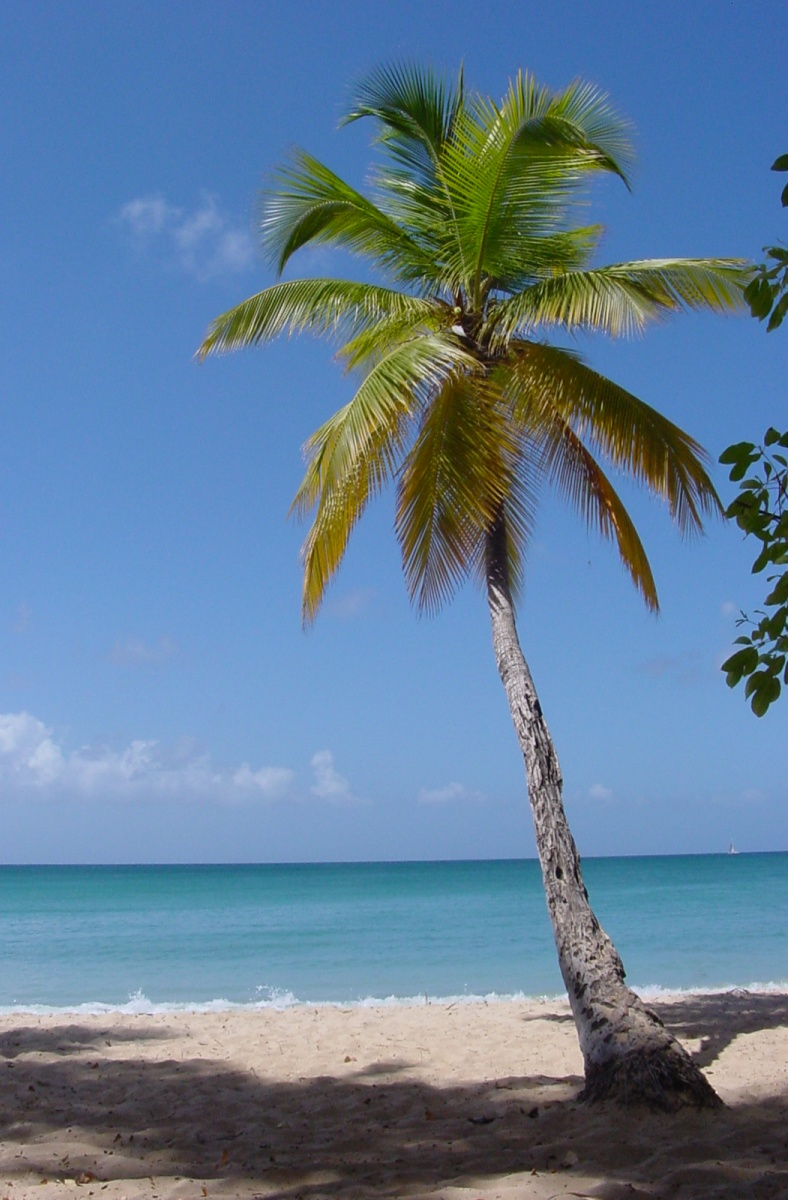

The first division, occupying the upper left corner, is a field of or charged by coconut palm. The coconut palm is a distinct feature of the Caribbean. The field represents gold and the richness of the land, the palm tree symbolizes stability and love in heroic enterprises.

The second division, occupying the right upper corner, is a field of gules with five Solidus coins in argent placed in saltire. The gules, or red, represents valor, honor, fire, and victory, and also loyalty to the crown. The coins are supposed to be in argent or silver, representing purity, faith and obedience, but instead they are now displayed in Or, or gold, probably to suppress its meaning of obedience, trying to be more independent, and less royalist.

The third division occupies the lower part of the shield. It is a field of azure with an undulated sea, charged by a Barque in sable. The blue, or azure, is an allusion to water, and the Caribbean Sea which forms an integral element of the department, it also alludes to its hydrological diversity, as the department is bathed by many important rivers and contains many marches and lakes. The black naval ship, it is a symbol of its maritime status, Cartagena, its capital, was and is a very important sea port, and the black represents its role in slavery as a slave port also, however, the ship is not black anymore but it has been changed to white and brown.

=== Crest and motto ===
Coat of arms of Colombia. Crest with no helm or mantling present, a bird with an olive crown, with a scroll in between, much like the coat of arms of Bolívar.

Although very unusual in heraldry, having a crest with no helm or mantling, it is common in the Andean Countries, as almost all of them display a condor with a scroll. The coat of arms of Bolívar follows this tradition and it has a goshawk with its wings extended looking to the left, symbolizing power, greatness and strength, holding an olive crown, symbolizing peace. In the blazon of the coat of arms, it calls for an “Aguila azorada” meaning an eagle in pursuit, but also it hints the species, as “azor” means goshawk in Spanish.

A scroll appears behind the bird, with the motto that reads in Latin, “Ab Ordine Libertas”, the old motto of Colombia, that is now translated into Spanish as “Orden y Libertad”, but which in a broader sense means, “From Order, Comes Freedom”.

== See also ==
- Coat of arms of Bolívar State
- Coat of arms of Catagena de Indias
- Flag of the Department of Bolívar
