= Flag of Santander Department =

New flag of the Department of Santander, modified in 2019

The flag of the Department of Santander is one of the symbols that identifies the Colombian Department of Santander.

== History ==
As the Sovereign State of Santander, the flag was the Colombian flag with the Colombian coat of arms in the center, with a red banner encircling the coat of arms that read "ESTADO SOBERANO DE SANTANDER" (es: Sovereign State of Santander).

When the states were dissolved and the Department of Santander was formed the symbols were obsolete and needed to change.

=== Modifications ===
In 1972, the Governor of Santander officially adopted the new flag of Santander by means of Decree No. 579 of 1972.

This flag served as the departmental flag until 2006 when it was modified by means of Decree No. 254 of 2006. The new flag would have eight stars instead of six, as in 2005, the Departmental Congress had modified the number of provinces from six to eight, and because the stars in the flag represented the provinces, the flag needed to be changed to represent its original meaning.

Flag of the Federal State of Santander (1857-1863)

Flag of the Sovereign State of Santander (1863-1886)

Flag of Santander (1972-2004)

Flag of Santander (2004-2007)

Flag of Santander (2008-2019)

== Description ==
The flag of Santander has a complicated design; it is a fimbriated horizontal bicolour triband, with a red stripe in the hoist that has eight stars.

Article 2 of Decree No. 579 of 1972 states that the flag of Santander would be a vert rectangle with two thirds the width in relation with its length, surmounted by a stripe of gules in the hoist, with a vertical line of six stars in argent. The field would be cut in the middle by a stripe of or of a quarter in width in respect to the flag, on top of this would be in the middle another horizontal stripe in sable, a third of the size of the previous stripe.

Due to the latest modifications, the stars would be eight, instead of six.

== Meanings ==
- The red hoist symbolizes the nobility and the vertical bravery of the Santanderian race.
- The argent stars represent the eight provincial nuclei that form part of the department: Soto Norte, Vélez, García Rovira, Guanentá, Comuneros, Mares, Metropolis and Carare Opon.
- The vert denotes loyalty, hope and the certainty with which the citizens of the department have worked its land and improved its industry with great effort.
- The or and sable stripes, symbolize the natural resources of the land that have been exploited since the times of the colony, these are gold, coal and petroleum.

== See also ==
- Coat of arms of the Department of Santander
- Flag of Bucaramanga
