= Turbaná, Bolívar =

Turbaná
- Municipality and town
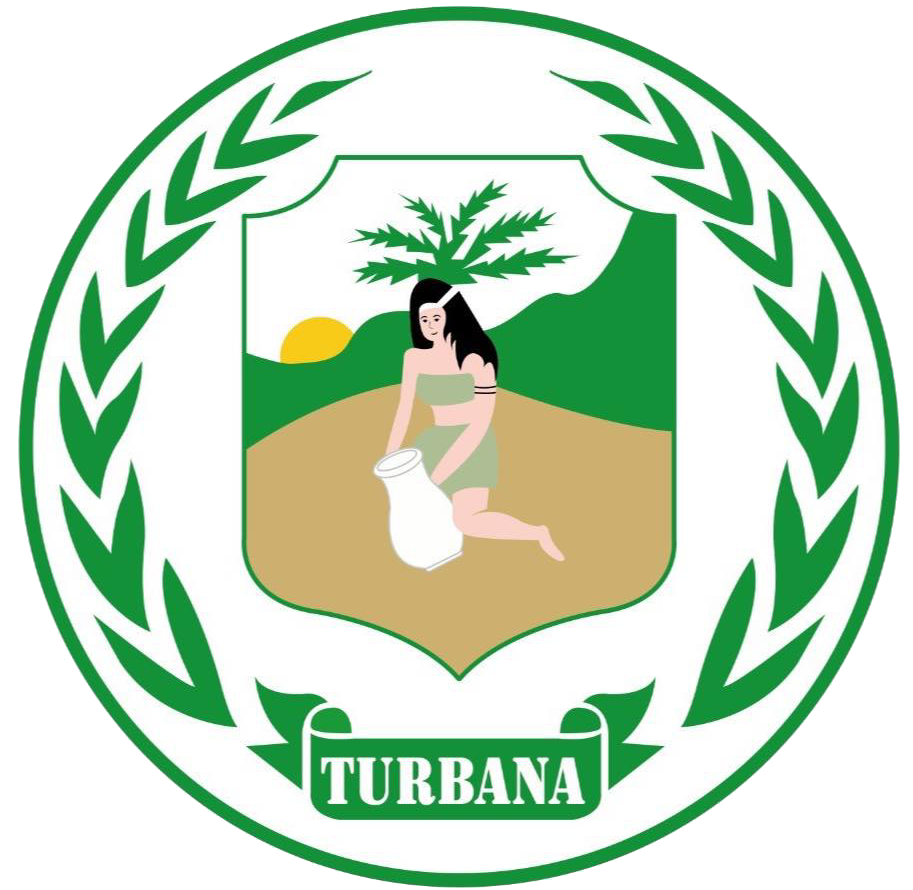
- Coat of arms

- Location of the municipality and town of Turbaná, Bolívar in the Bolívar Department of Colombia
- Coordinates: 10°17′N 75°27′W
- Country: Colombia
- Department: Bolívar
- Subregion: Dique bolivarense
- Founded: 17 July 1894

Government
  - Mayor: Senen Cantillo Paternina (2016-2019)

Area
  - Municipality and town: 148 km^{2} (57 sq mi)
- Elevation: 80 m (260 ft)

Population (2015)
  - Municipality and town: 72,168
  - Density: 488/km^{2} (1,260/sq mi)
  - Urban: 66,913
- Time zone: UTC-5 (Colombia Standard Time)
- Website: Official website

Turbaná is a municipality in the Bolívar department in Colombia. Most of the people living here depend on agriculture and cattle raising for their main income. There is no sewer system or dump and waste is disposed of in streams and roadways. The temperature averages from 27 to 30 °C (81 to 86 °F). Turbaná borders Turbaco and Cartagena in the north, Arjona in the south and Arjona and Turbaco in the east.
