= Mojana Province =

- Province
- Country: Colombia
- Department: Bolívar
- Time zone: UTC−05:00 (COT)

The Mojana Province is a subregion of the Colombian Department of Bolívar.
