= North Soto Province =

- Province
- Country: Colombia
- Department: Santander
- Time zone: UTC−05:00 (COT)

The North Soto Province is a province of the Santander Department of Colombia.
