= Depresión Momposina Province =

Mompox Island Province
- Province
- Country: Colombia
- Department: Bolívar
- Time zone: UTC−05:00 (COT)

The Mompox Island Province is a subregion of the Bolívar Department of Colombia.
