= Armorial of Venezuela =

Venezuela is a federation made up of twenty-three states, and each has a separate coat of arms. Federal Dependencies of Venezuela are only using a flag.

== Gallery ==
Coat of arms of Amazonas

Coat of arms of Anzoátegui, adopted in 1933

Coat of arms of Apure

Coat of arms of Aragua

Coat of arms of Barinas, adopted in 1910

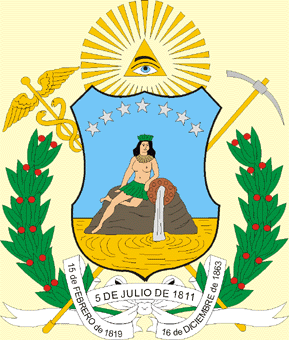
Coat of arms of Bolívar, adopted in 1922

Coat of arms of Carabobo

Coat of arms of Cojedes, since 1960

Coat of arms of Delta Amacuro

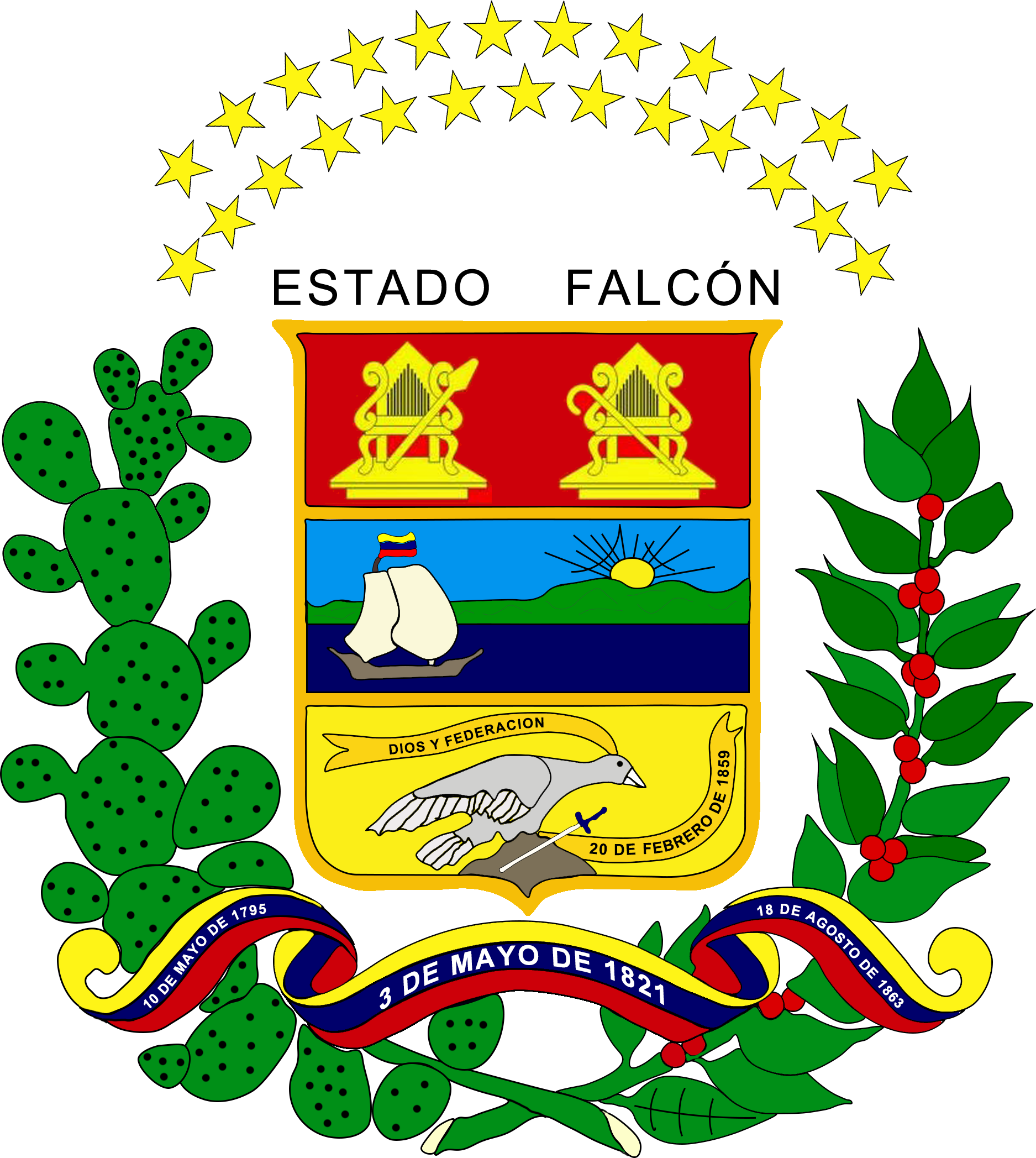
Coat of arms of Falcón, adopted in 1950

Coat of arms of Guárico, since 1912

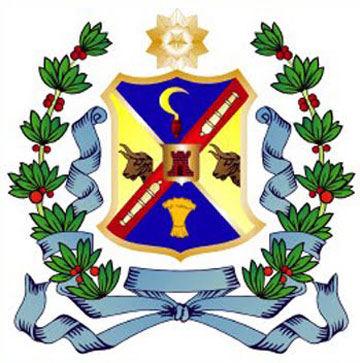
Coat of arms of Lara, adopted in 1905

Coat of arms of Mérida, since 1905

Coat of arms of Monagas

Coat of arms of Nueva Esparta, adopted in 1917

Coat of arms of Portuguesa, since 1948

Coat of arms of Sucre, since 1910

Coat of arms of Trujillo, since 1905

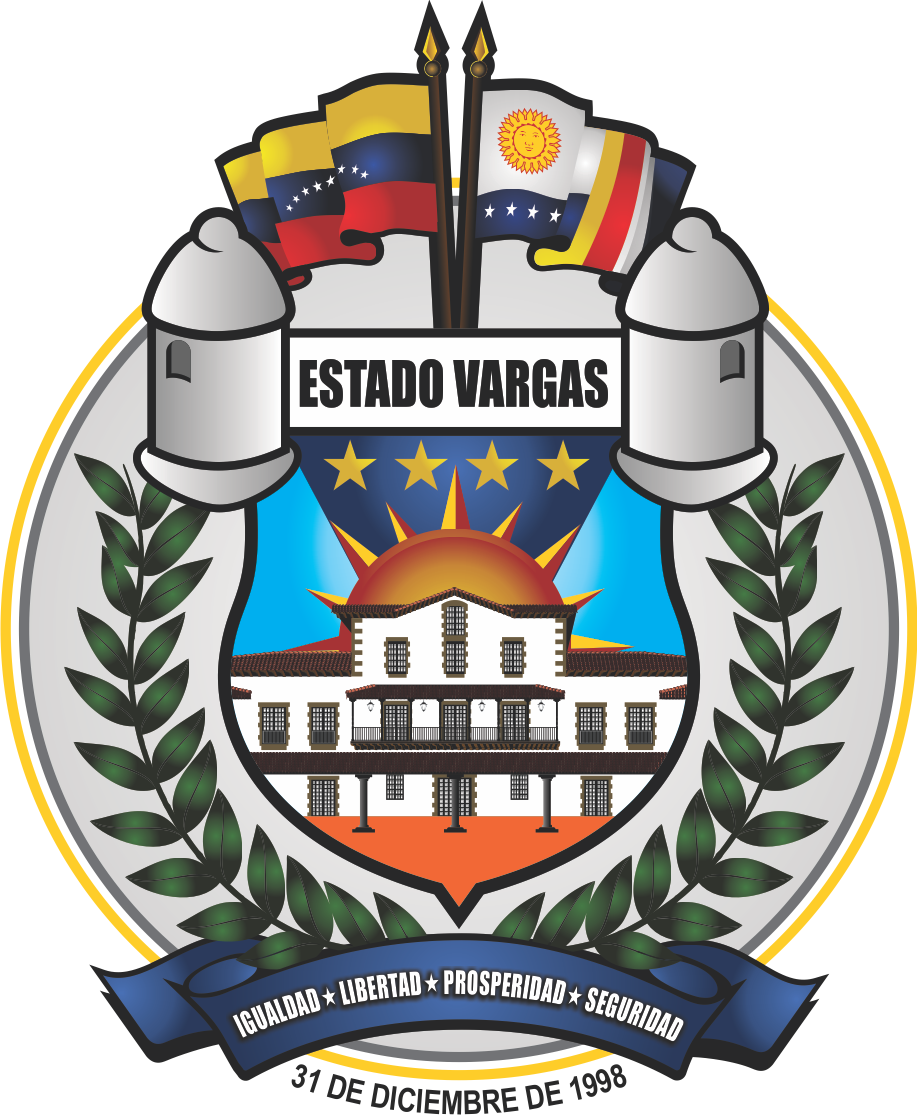
Coat of arms of Vargas

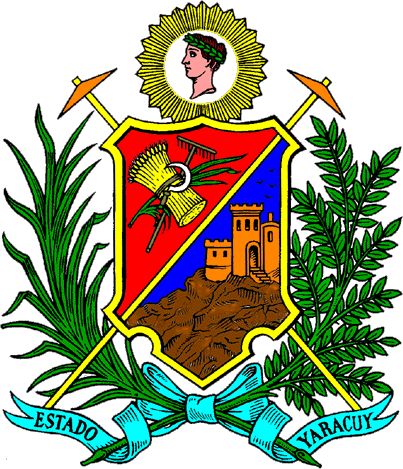
Coat of arms of Yaracuy

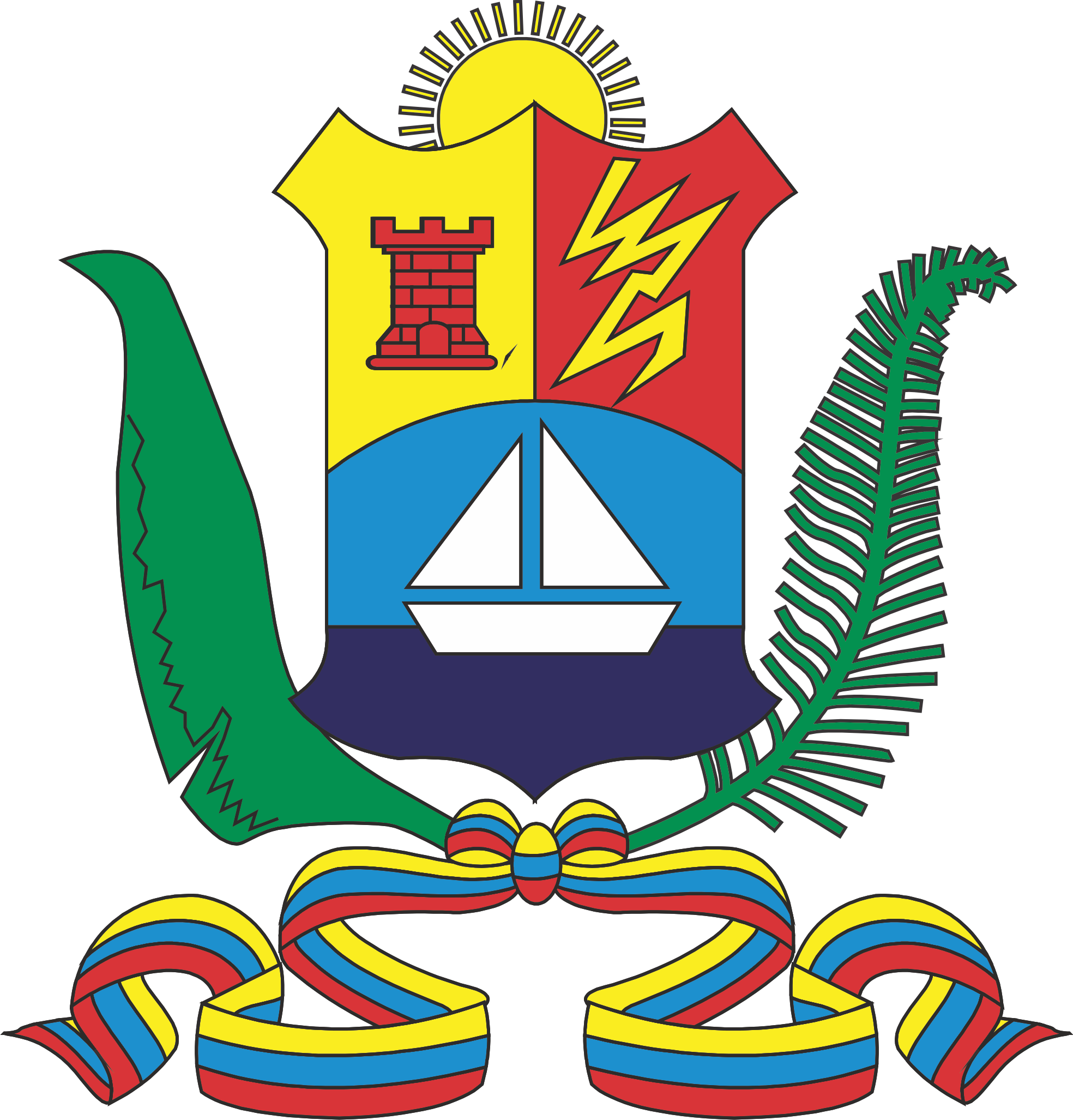
Coat of arms of Zulia, since 1917

== Coat of arms of Caracas ==
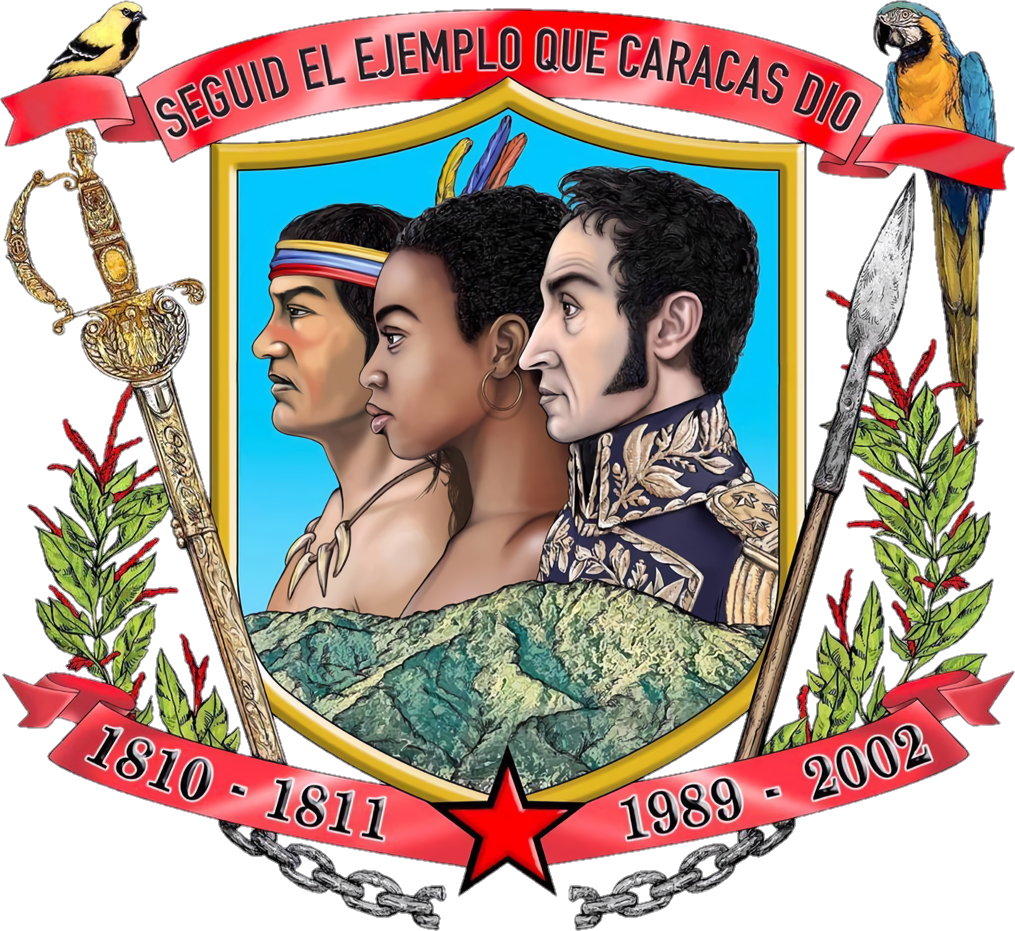
Coat of arms of Caracas, used since 2022

== See also ==
- Coat of arms of Venezuela
