= Arroyo Hondo =

Arroyo Hondo (Spanish: deep stream) may refer to:

== United States ==
- Arroyo Hondo (Santa Clara County, California), a stream
- Arroyo Hondo, Santa Fe County, New Mexico, a census-designated place
- Arroyo Hondo, Taos County, New Mexico, a census-designated place
- Arroyo Hondo Pueblo in New Mexico
- Hondo Creek, Texas; site of the 1842 Battle of Arroyo Hondo

== Other nations ==
- Arroyohondo, a municipality in Colombia
- Arroyo Hondo, Cuba, a settlement in Guantánamo municipality
