= Santa Rosa Municipality =

Santa Rosa Municipality may refer to:

- Santa Rosa Municipality, Beni
- Santa Rosa, Bolívar
- Santa Rosa, Cauca
