= Cantagallo, Bolívar =

Cantagallo
- Municipality and town
- Flag

- Location of the municipality and town of Cantagallo in the Bolívar Department of Colombia

- Location in Colombia
- Coordinates: 7°22′34″N 73°54′55″W
- Country: Colombia
- Department: Bolívar Department

Area
  - Total: 669 km^{2} (258 sq mi)

Population (Census 2018)
  - Total: 6,874
  - Density: 10.3/km^{2} (26.6/sq mi)

Cantagallo is a town and municipality located in the Bolívar Department, Northern Colombia. It is the southernmost municipality of the province. It was founded on 1 January 1938 and became a municipality by Ordinance no. 30 of 16 December 1994.

== Climate ==
Cantagallo has a tropical monsoon climate (Am) with moderate to little rainfall from December to March and heavy to very heavy rainfall from April to November.

Climate data for Cantagallo
Month	Jan	Feb	Mar	Apr	May	Jun	Jul	Aug	Sep	Oct	Nov	Dec	Year
Mean daily maximum °C (°F)	33.0 (91.4)	33.4 (92.1)	33.6 (92.5)	32.7 (90.9)	32.2 (90.0)	32.4 (90.3)	32.7 (90.9)	32.4 (90.3)	32.0 (89.6)	31.4 (88.5)	31.6 (88.9)	32.3 (90.1)	32.5 (90.5)
Daily mean °C (°F)	28.4 (83.1)	28.8 (83.8)	29.3 (84.7)	28.7 (83.7)	28.4 (83.1)	28.5 (83.3)	28.5 (83.3)	28.3 (82.9)	28.1 (82.6)	27.8 (82.0)	28.0 (82.4)	28.4 (83.1)	28.4 (83.2)
Mean daily minimum °C (°F)	23.9 (75.0)	24.2 (75.6)	25.0 (77.0)	24.8 (76.6)	24.7 (76.5)	24.6 (76.3)	24.3 (75.7)	24.3 (75.7)	24.2 (75.6)	24.3 (75.7)	24.5 (76.1)	24.5 (76.1)	24.4 (76.0)
Average rainfall mm (inches)	36 (1.4)	48 (1.9)	108 (4.3)	255 (10.0)	332 (13.1)	293 (11.5)	273 (10.7)	333 (13.1)	393 (15.5)	404 (15.9)	252 (9.9)	61 (2.4)	2,788 (109.7)
