= Zambrano, Bolívar =

- Municipality and town
- Motto: Strength and Willpower
- Location of the municipality and town of Zambrano, Bolívar in the Bolívar Department of Colombia
- Coordinates: 9°45′N 74°50′W
- Country: Colombia
- Department: Bolívar Department
- Established: January 20, 1770
- Founder: Don Alvaro de Zambrano

Area
  - Total: 302 km^{2} (117 sq mi)
- Elevation: 13 m (43 ft)

Population (Census 2018)
  - Total: 11,367
  - Density: 37.6/km^{2} (97.5/sq mi)
- Time zone: UTC-5 (Colombia Standard Time)
- Patron saint: Saint Sebastian
- Website: www.zambrano-bolivar.gov.co

Zambrano is a town and municipality located in the Bolívar Department, northern Colombia. It was founded in 1770 By Don Alvaro de Zambrano in what was once Territories which belonged to the native Malibùes. It is located Two and a half Hours from the Departmental capital, Cartagena, Bolivar. During the War for independence, Zambrano played a very important role in the support for Simon Bolivar and for independence from the Kingdom of Spain by many Brave troops fighting for the Colombian Independence movement. In fact, Simon Bolivar stayed one night in Zambrano and was housed by the Campillo Family. The economy is largely agricultural and thanks to its location on the Magdalena River.

== Climate ==
Climate data for Zambrano (Monterrey Forestal), elevation 25 m (82 ft), (1981–2010)
Month	Jan	Feb	Mar	Apr	May	Jun	Jul	Aug	Sep	Oct	Nov	Dec	Year
Mean daily maximum °C (°F)	34.4 (93.9)	34.8 (94.6)	34.9 (94.8)	34.3 (93.7)	33.8 (92.8)	33.7 (92.7)	34.0 (93.2)	33.9 (93.0)	33.1 (91.6)	32.8 (91.0)	32.9 (91.2)	33.3 (91.9)	33.8 (92.8)
Daily mean °C (°F)	28.5 (83.3)	28.8 (83.8)	29.0 (84.2)	28.9 (84.0)	28.4 (83.1)	28.4 (83.1)	28.3 (82.9)	28.1 (82.6)	27.9 (82.2)	27.7 (81.9)	27.9 (82.2)	28.0 (82.4)	28.3 (82.9)
Mean daily minimum °C (°F)	21.1 (70.0)	21.6 (70.9)	22.5 (72.5)	22.8 (73.0)	23.0 (73.4)	22.9 (73.2)	22.9 (73.2)	23.0 (73.4)	22.6 (72.7)	22.9 (73.2)	22.5 (72.5)	21.8 (71.2)	22.5 (72.5)
Average precipitation mm (inches)	13.7 (0.54)	24.2 (0.95)	40.0 (1.57)	68.9 (2.71)	108.5 (4.27)	108.7 (4.28)	85.0 (3.35)	110.1 (4.33)	106.7 (4.20)	122.5 (4.82)	73.0 (2.87)	28.4 (1.12)	888.4 (34.98)
Average precipitation days (≥ 1.0 mm)	1	2	4	7	9	8	8	9	9	9	6	3	73
Average relative humidity (%)	73	73	74	76	80	80	78	79	81	82	82	79	78
Mean monthly sunshine hours	266.6	231.5	217.0	189.0	170.5	195.0	210.8	213.9	174.0	173.6	186.0	226.3	2,454.2
Mean daily sunshine hours	8.6	8.2	7.0	6.3	5.5	6.5	6.8	6.9	5.8	5.6	6.2	7.3	6.7
Source: Instituto de Hidrologia Meteorologia y Estudios Ambientales
