= Río Viejo =

Coordinates: 8.59°N 73.8436°W

Rio Viejo
- Municipality and town
- Flag

- Location of the municipality and town of Rio Viejo in the Bolívar Department of Colombia
- Country: Colombia
- Department: Bolívar Department

Population (Census 2018)
  - Total: 8,125
- Time zone: UTC-5 (Colombia Standard Time)

Río Viejo is a town and municipality located in the Bolívar Department, northern Colombia.

== Climate ==
Climate data for Río Viejo (Norosi), elevation 160 m (520 ft), (1981–2010)
Month	Jan	Feb	Mar	Apr	May	Jun	Jul	Aug	Sep	Oct	Nov	Dec	Year
Mean daily maximum °C (°F)	34.6 (94.3)	35.3 (95.5)	35.2 (95.4)	34.4 (93.9)	33.4 (92.1)	33.7 (92.7)	34.1 (93.4)	33.7 (92.7)	32.9 (91.2)	32.4 (90.3)	32.8 (91.0)	33.8 (92.8)	33.9 (93.0)
Daily mean °C (°F)	28.2 (82.8)	28.9 (84.0)	29.1 (84.4)	28.8 (83.8)	28.1 (82.6)	28.1 (82.6)	28.3 (82.9)	28.1 (82.6)	27.5 (81.5)	27.3 (81.1)	27.5 (81.5)	27.9 (82.2)	28.2 (82.8)
Mean daily minimum °C (°F)	22.8 (73.0)	23.5 (74.3)	24.1 (75.4)	24.1 (75.4)	23.6 (74.5)	23.4 (74.1)	23.1 (73.6)	23.3 (73.9)	22.9 (73.2)	22.9 (73.2)	23.2 (73.8)	22.7 (72.9)	23.3 (73.9)
Average precipitation mm (inches)	5.7 (0.22)	16.4 (0.65)	37.9 (1.49)	160.2 (6.31)	211.0 (8.31)	157.8 (6.21)	143.8 (5.66)	175.0 (6.89)	203.9 (8.03)	200.3 (7.89)	116.4 (4.58)	22.2 (0.87)	1,448.3 (57.02)
Average precipitation days (≥ 1.0 mm)	1	2	5	11	15	12	11	15	16	15	10	2	110
Average relative humidity (%)	75	73	73	76	80	80	78	79	81	82	81	78	78
Source: Instituto de Hidrologia Meteorologia y Estudios Ambientales
