= Altos del Rosario =

- Municipality and town
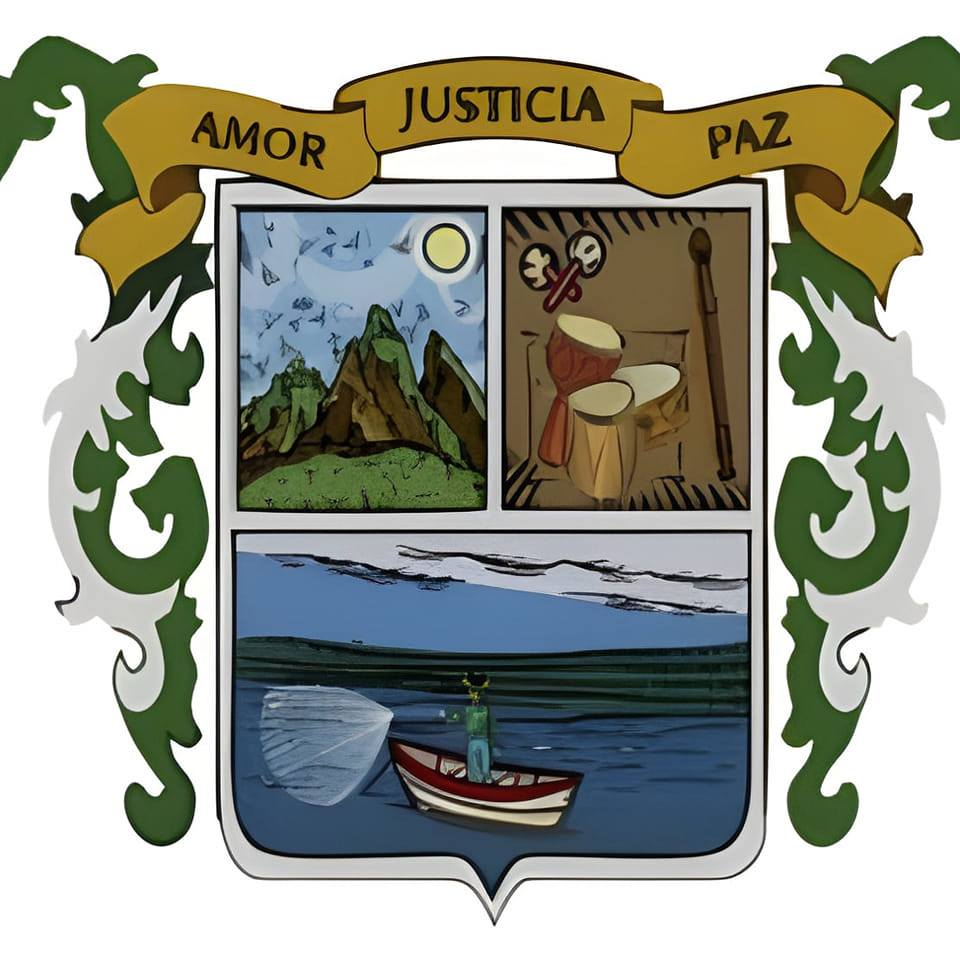
- Flag Coat of arms

- Location of the municipality and town of Altos del Rosario in the Bolívar Department of Colombia

- Location in Colombia
- Coordinates: 8°48′N 74°10′W
- Country: Colombia
- Department: Bolívar Department

Area
  - Municipality and town: 248.66 km^{2} (96.01 sq mi)
- Elevation: 850 m (2,790 ft)

Population (2015)
  - Municipality and town: 13,669
  - Urban: 8,073
- Climate: Am
- Website: www.altosdelrosario.com

Altos del Rosario is a town and municipality located in the Bolívar Department, northern Colombia.

== Climate ==
Altos del Rosario has a tropical monsoon climate (Am) with moderate to little rainfall from January to March and heavy to very heavy rainfall in the remaining months.

Climate data for Altos del Rosario
Month	Jan	Feb	Mar	Apr	May	Jun	Jul	Aug	Sep	Oct	Nov	Dec	Year
Mean daily maximum °C (°F)	32.9 (91.2)	33.4 (92.1)	33.8 (92.8)	33.3 (91.9)	32.5 (90.5)	32.4 (90.3)	32.9 (91.2)	32.8 (91.0)	32.1 (89.8)	31.5 (88.7)	31.5 (88.7)	32.2 (90.0)	32.6 (90.7)
Daily mean °C (°F)	28.3 (82.9)	28.6 (83.5)	29.1 (84.4)	28.9 (84.0)	28.5 (83.3)	28.4 (83.1)	28.5 (83.3)	28.5 (83.3)	28.0 (82.4)	27.7 (81.9)	27.8 (82.0)	28.0 (82.4)	28.4 (83.0)
Mean daily minimum °C (°F)	23.7 (74.7)	23.9 (75.0)	24.5 (76.1)	24.6 (76.3)	24.6 (76.3)	24.4 (75.9)	24.2 (75.6)	24.2 (75.6)	23.9 (75.0)	24.0 (75.2)	24.2 (75.6)	23.9 (75.0)	24.2 (75.5)
Average rainfall mm (inches)	41.1 (1.62)	42.3 (1.67)	87.5 (3.44)	224.2 (8.83)	370.6 (14.59)	294.3 (11.59)	307.4 (12.10)	365.6 (14.39)	482.8 (19.01)	534.5 (21.04)	440.9 (17.36)	166.8 (6.57)	3,358 (132.21)
Average rainy days	1	2	3	7	11	9	10	11	14	15	13	5	101
Source: IDEAM
