= El Guamo =

Coordinates: 10°05′N 74°55′W

- Municipality and town
- Flag

- Location of the municipality and town of El Guamo in the Bolívar Department of Colombia
- Country: Colombia
- Department: Bolívar Department
- Time zone: UTC-5 (Colombia Standard Time)

El Guamo (Spanish pronunciation: [el ˈɣwamo]) is a town and municipality located in the Bolívar Department, northern Colombia.

== Climate ==
Climate data for El Guamo (Guamo El), elevation 75 m (246 ft), (1981–2010)
Month	Jan	Feb	Mar	Apr	May	Jun	Jul	Aug	Sep	Oct	Nov	Dec	Year
Mean daily maximum °C (°F)	35.7 (96.3)	36.3 (97.3)	36.2 (97.2)	35.3 (95.5)	33.7 (92.7)	34.0 (93.2)	34.5 (94.1)	34.2 (93.6)	33.5 (92.3)	32.6 (90.7)	32.9 (91.2)	34.2 (93.6)	34.4 (93.9)
Daily mean °C (°F)	28.1 (82.6)	28.6 (83.5)	28.9 (84.0)	28.8 (83.8)	28.2 (82.8)	28.1 (82.6)	28.2 (82.8)	28.1 (82.6)	27.7 (81.9)	27.1 (80.8)	27.3 (81.1)	27.6 (81.7)	28.1 (82.6)
Mean daily minimum °C (°F)	20.7 (69.3)	21.5 (70.7)	22.2 (72.0)	23.3 (73.9)	23.6 (74.5)	23.3 (73.9)	23.1 (73.6)	23.3 (73.9)	23.2 (73.8)	22.9 (73.2)	22.6 (72.7)	21.6 (70.9)	22.7 (72.9)
Average precipitation mm (inches)	16.7 (0.66)	24.7 (0.97)	51.7 (2.04)	115.0 (4.53)	144.8 (5.70)	124.0 (4.88)	115.0 (4.53)	145.5 (5.73)	159.2 (6.27)	176.7 (6.96)	97.2 (3.83)	45.2 (1.78)	1,215.1 (47.84)
Average precipitation days (≥ 1.0 mm)	2	3	5	10	13	13	12	14	14	14	12	5	116
Average relative humidity (%)	71	69	70	74	79	80	78	79	81	84	82	77	77
Source: Instituto de Hidrologia Meteorologia y Estudios Ambientales

== Sources ==
- El Guamo municipal website (in Spanish)
