= San Pablo, Bolívar =

Coordinates: 7°28′57″N 73°55′30″W

- Municipality and town
- Flag Coat of arms

- Location of the municipality and town of San Pablo, Bolívar in the Bolívar Department of Colombia
- Country: Colombia
- Department: Bolívar Department

Population (2020 est.)
  - Total: 37,160
- Time zone: UTC-5 (Colombia Standard Time)

San Pablo is a town and municipality located in the Bolívar Department, northern Colombia.

== Climate ==
Climate data for San Pablo (Col Cooperativo), elevation 165 m (541 ft), (1981–2010)
Month	Jan	Feb	Mar	Apr	May	Jun	Jul	Aug	Sep	Oct	Nov	Dec	Year
Mean daily maximum °C (°F)	33.7 (92.7)	34.0 (93.2)	33.7 (92.7)	32.8 (91.0)	32.5 (90.5)	32.8 (91.0)	33.1 (91.6)	32.8 (91.0)	32.3 (90.1)	31.8 (89.2)	32.0 (89.6)	32.9 (91.2)	32.9 (91.2)
Daily mean °C (°F)	28.7 (83.7)	28.9 (84.0)	28.8 (83.8)	28.2 (82.8)	28.1 (82.6)	28.3 (82.9)	28.4 (83.1)	28.3 (82.9)	27.9 (82.2)	27.6 (81.7)	27.8 (82.0)	28.4 (83.1)	28.3 (82.9)
Mean daily minimum °C (°F)	23.2 (73.8)	23.3 (73.9)	23.6 (74.5)	23.6 (74.5)	23.5 (74.3)	23.5 (74.3)	23.3 (73.9)	23.3 (73.9)	23.2 (73.8)	23.2 (73.8)	23.4 (74.1)	23.4 (74.1)	23.4 (74.1)
Average precipitation mm (inches)	26.5 (1.04)	67.5 (2.66)	105.2 (4.14)	244.0 (9.61)	347.2 (13.67)	283.0 (11.14)	286.8 (11.29)	360.8 (14.20)	367.4 (14.46)	359.1 (14.14)	223.1 (8.78)	61.7 (2.43)	2,730.1 (107.48)
Average precipitation days (≥ 1.0 mm)	2	4	7	13	16	14	14	16	17	18	12	5	139
Average relative humidity (%)	73	73	73	76	76	75	75	75	76	77	77	75	75
Source: Instituto de Hidrologia Meteorologia y Estudios Ambientales
