= Dique Province =

- Province
- Country: Colombia
- Department: Bolívar
- Time zone: UTC−05:00 (COT)

The Dique Province is a subregion of the Bolívar Department of Colombia.
