= Norosí =

- Municipality and town
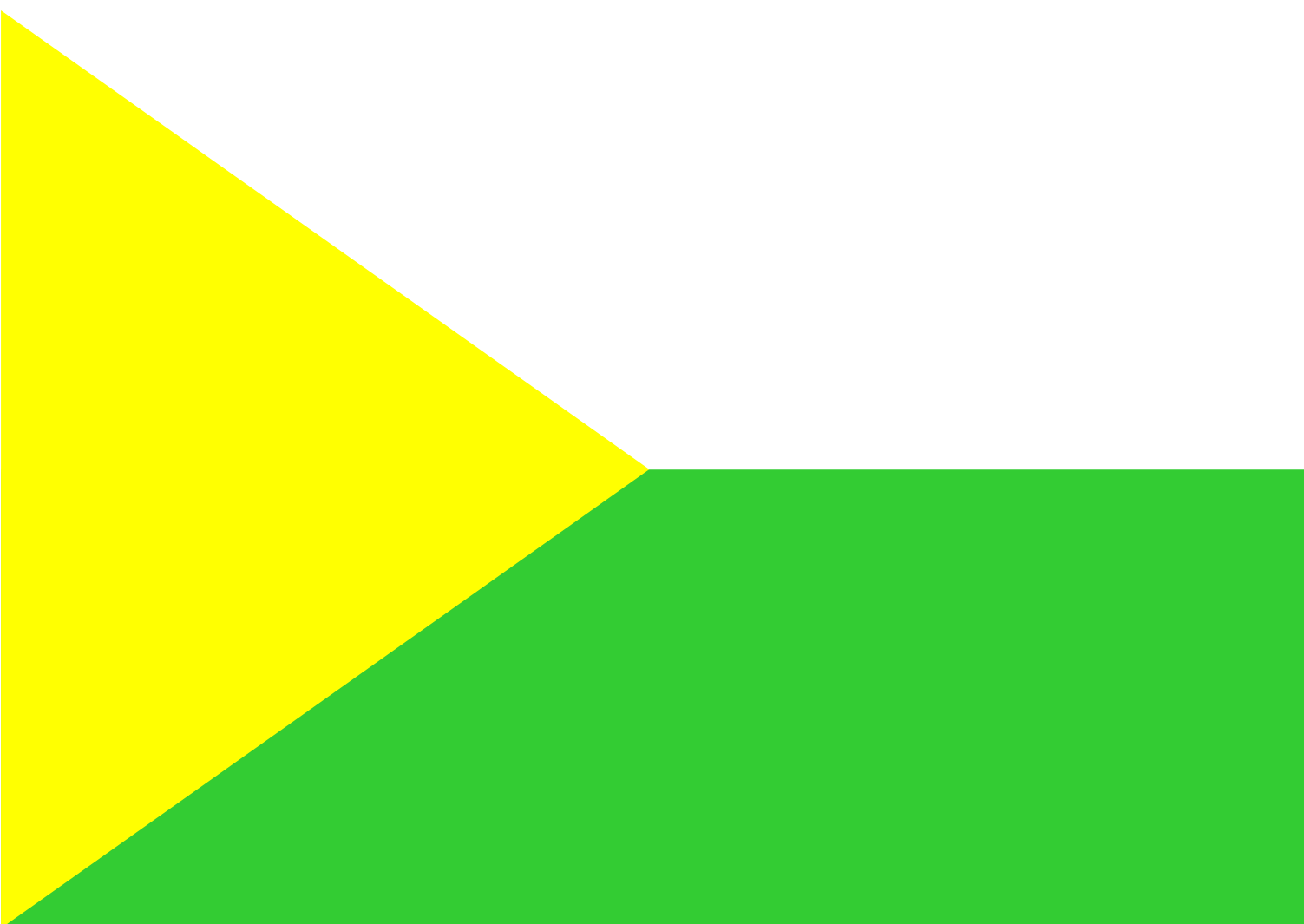
- Seal

- Location of the municipality and town of Norosí in the Bolívar Department of Colombia
- Coordinates: 8°31′34″N 74°2′16″W
- Country: Colombia
- Department: Bolívar Department
- Established: 2007
- Time zone: UTC-5 (Colombia Standard Time)

Norosí is a town and municipality located in the Bolívar Department, northern Colombia. The municipality was established in 2007.
