= Regidor, Bolívar =

Coordinates: 8°40′N 73°50′W

Regidor, Bolivar
- Municipality and town
- Flag

- Location of the municipality and town of Regidor, Bolivar in the Bolívar Department of Colombia
- Country: Colombia
- Department: Bolívar Department

Population (Census 2018)
  - Total: 5,335
- Time zone: UTC-5 (Colombia Standard Time)
- Website: http://www.regidor-bolivar.gov.co/

Regidor is a town and municipality located in the Bolívar Department, northern Colombia in a lowland area along the banks of the Magdalena River. The principal industry of Regidor is cultivation of Oil Palm. Many subsistence farmers have been pressured to sell their land to oil palm companies and to displace.
