= El Peñón, Bolívar =

Coordinates: 8°59′18″N 73°56′58″W

El Peñón
- Municipality and town
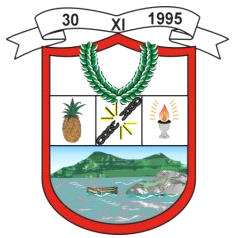
- Coat of arms

- Location of the municipality and town of El Peñón, Bolívar in the Bolívar Department of Colombia
- Country: Colombia
- Department: Bolívar Department

Population (Census 2018)
  - Total: 7,234
- Time zone: UTC-5 (Colombia Standard Time)

El Peñón is a town and municipality located in the Bolívar Department, northern Colombia.
