= Postage stamps and postal history of Bolívar =

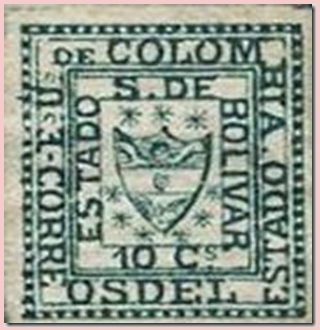
An 1863 stamp of Bolivar

Bolívar is a department of Colombia. It was one of the original nine states of the "United States of Colombia". Bolivar is in the north of the country, extending from the coast at Cartagena near the mouth of the Magdalena River, then south along the river to a border with Antioquia.

== Postage stamps ==
Bolívar issued its own postage stamps from 1863 to 1904. Most of them feature portraits of Simón Bolívar, and most are commonly available, although as with all the Colombian states, surviving uses on cover are scarce.

== Sources ==
- Stanley Gibbons Ltd: various catalogues
- Encyclopaedia of Postal Authorities
- Rossiter, Stuart & John Flower. The Stamp Atlas. London: Macdonald, 1986. ISBN 0-356-10862-7
