= Tiquisio =

Coordinates: 8°34′N 74°16′W

- Municipality and town
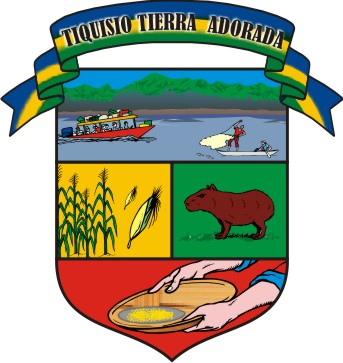
- Flag Coat of arms

- Location of the municipality and town of Tiquisio in the Bolívar Department of Colombia
- Country: Colombia
- Department: Bolívar Department

Population (Census 2018)
  - Total: 17,939
- Time zone: UTC-5 (Colombia Standard Time)

Tiquisio is a town and municipality located in the Bolívar Department, northern Colombia.
