= Turbaco =

Municipality and town in Bolívar Department, Colombia

- Municipality and town
- Turbaco Plaza, Church of Santa Catalina

- Flag
- Nickname: Los Tira Piedra
- Location of the municipality and town of Turbaco in the Bolívar Department of Colombia

- Location in Colombia
- Coordinates: 10°19′N 75°26′W
- Country: Colombia
- Department: Bolívar Department

Government
  - Mayor: Guillermo Torres

Area
  - Municipality and town: 202 km^{2} (78 sq mi)
  - Urban: 13.92 km^{2} (5.37 sq mi)
- Elevation: 128 m (420 ft)

Population (2018 census)
  - Municipality and town: 105,166
  - Density: 521/km^{2} (1,350/sq mi)
  - Urban: 97,294
  - Urban density: 6,990/km^{2} (18,100/sq mi)
- Demonym: Turbaquero
- Time zone: UTC-5 (Colombia Standard Time)
- Area code: 57 + 5
- Website: Official website (in Spanish)

Turbaco is a municipality in the Bolívar Department of Colombia. It is located about 20 km southeast of Cartagena de Indias and is one of Bolívar's most organized municipalities. Turbaco is known for its famous "Fiesta de Toros" (Bulls' feast) in December to celebrate the new year.

Juan de la Cosa was mortally wounded here in 1510, before Pedro de Heredia subjugated the area in 1533.

Antonio López de Santa Anna spent some of his years in exile here, 1850–1853 and 1855–1857.
