= San Fernando, Bolívar =

Coordinates: 9°16′47″N 74°32′02″W

San Fernando
- Municipality and town
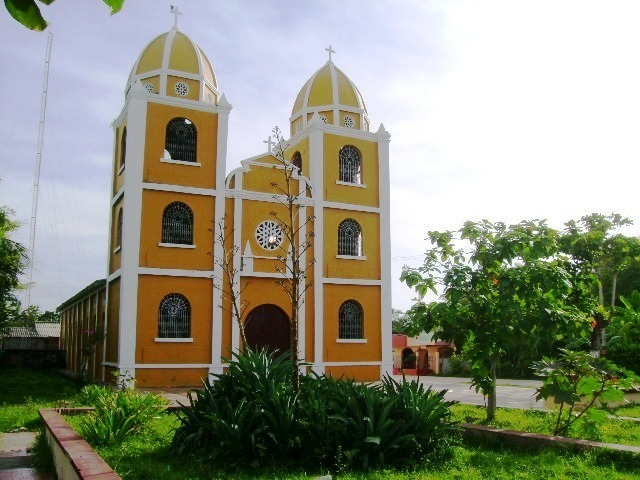

- Flag

- Location of the municipality and town of San Fernando, Bolívar in the Bolívar Department of Colombia
- Country: Colombia
- Department: Bolívar Department

Area
  - Total: 288 km^{2} (111 sq mi)

Population (Census 2018)
  - Total: 9,776
  - Density: 33.9/km^{2} (87.9/sq mi)
- Time zone: UTC-5 (Colombia Standard Time)

San Fernando is a town and municipality located in the Bolívar Department, northern Colombia.
