= Hatillo de Loba =

Coordinates: 8.95861°N 74.0808°W

- Municipality and town
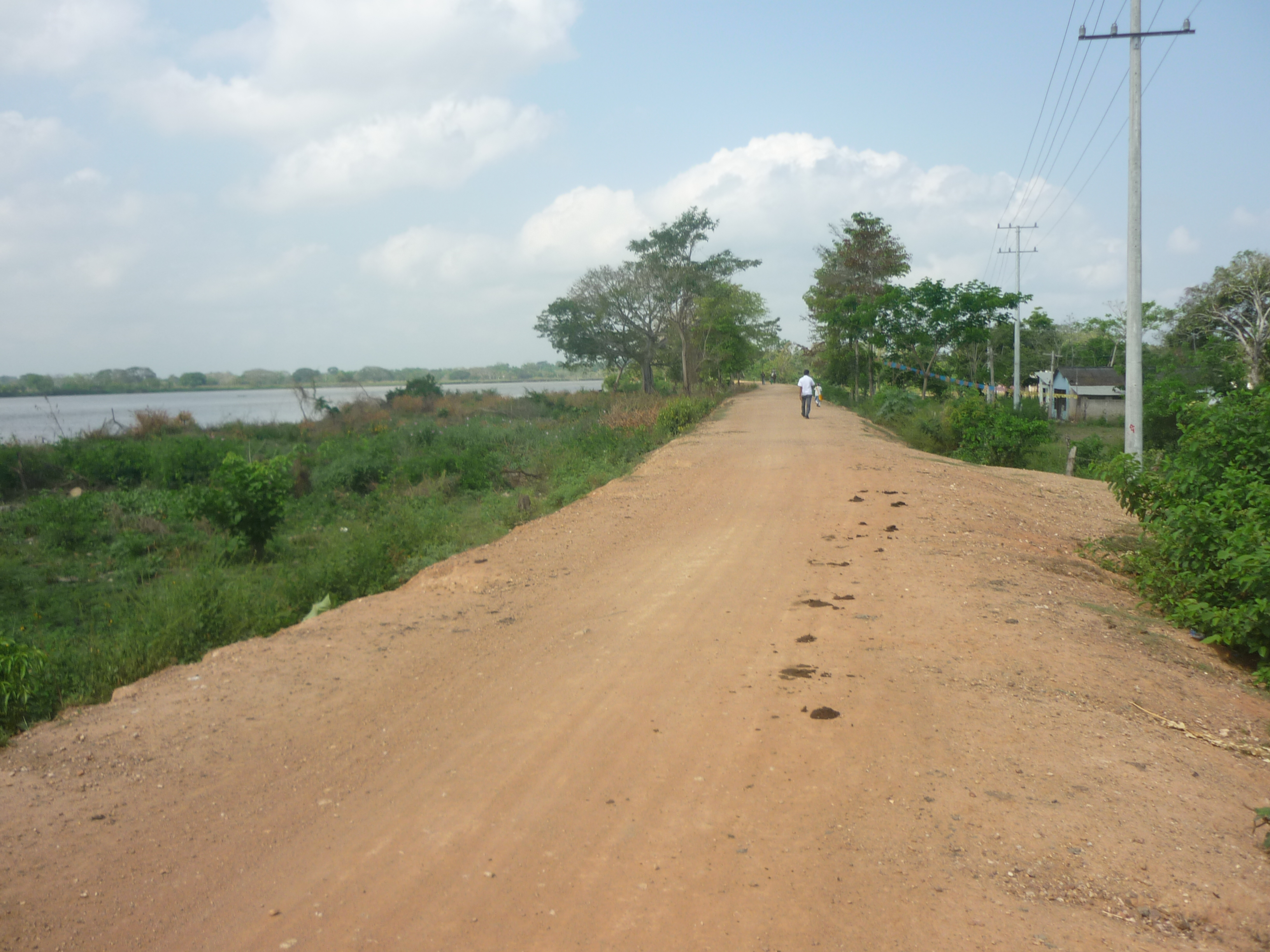

- Flag

- Location of the municipality and town of Hatillo de Loba in the Bolívar Department of Colombia
- Country: Colombia
- Department: Bolívar Department

Area
  - Total: 196 km^{2} (76 sq mi)

Population (Census 2018)
  - Total: 11,770
  - Density: 60.1/km^{2} (156/sq mi)
- Time zone: UTC-5 (Colombia Standard Time)

Hatillo de Loba is a town and municipality located in the Bolívar Department, northern Colombia.
