= Margarita, Bolívar =

Coordinates: 9°05′N 74°12′W

Margarita, Bolívar margaritanos
- Municipality and town
- Flag Coat of arms

- Location of the municipality and town of Margarita, Bolívar in the Bolívar Department of Colombia
- Country: Colombia
- Department: Bolívar Department

Area
  - Total: 263 km^{2} (102 sq mi)

Population (Census 2018)
  - Total: 9,720
  - Density: 37.0/km^{2} (95.7/sq mi)
- Time zone: UTC-5 (Colombia Standard Time)

Margarita (Spanish pronunciation: [maɾɣaˈɾita]) is a town and municipality located in the Bolívar Department, northern Colombia.
