= Arroyohondo =

- Municipality and town
- Flag

- Location of the municipality and town of Arroyo Hondo in the Bolívar Department of Colombia

- Location in Colombia
- Coordinates: 10°8′N 75°34′W
- Country: Colombia
- Department: Bolívar Department

Area
  - Municipality and town: 162 km^{2} (63 sq mi)
- Elevation: 30 m (98 ft)

Population (2015)
  - Municipality and town: 9,907
  - Urban: 6,635
- Website: http://www.arroyohondo-bolivar.gov.co/

Arroyohondo is a town and municipality located in the Bolívar Department, northern Colombia.
