= Santa Rosa, Bolívar =

- Municipality and town
- Flag

- Location of the municipality and town of Santa Rosa in the Bolívar Department of Colombia
- Coordinates: 10°26′44″N 75°22′7″W
- Country: Colombia
- Department: Bolívar Department

Population (Census 2018)
  - Total: 18,375
- Time zone: UTC-5 (Colombia Standard Time)

Santa Rosa is a town and municipality located in the Bolívar Department, northern Colombia.
