= Flag of Bolívar Department =

Flag of Bolívar Department

The Flag of the Department of Bolívar is a horizontal tricolour and serves as the official flag for the Department of Bolívar in Colombia. The flag of the department is similar to the flag of Lithuania, but lighter.

== History ==
The Flag has an unknown origin, and the laws that refer to the standard and arms of the department were altered and some lost, the order of colors was probably changed, although the colors remain the same, in being a flag with a simple design no special instructions were written nor applied into law till 1857 when the Sovereign State of Bolívar was created and a new flag was adopted, which was the Flag of Colombia with the Coat of arms of Colombia superimposed in the center with an oval border in red that said ESTADO SOBERANO DE BOLIVAR, this flag was used for all the states with the inscription changed to their name.

In 1886 the States were suppressed and Departments were created. This time the old flag was adopted officially.

== Meaning ==
- Yellow, symbolizing wealth and abundance, representing the historical value and economical support of the department.
- Green, symbolizes hope for the future.
- Red, symbolizes valor and courage, and represents the blood of patriots spilled in times of war.

== See also ==
- Flag of Bolívar State
