= Subregions of Colombia =

Departmental subregions
- Category: Intermediate level between departments and municipalities
- Location: Colombia
- Found in: Departments
- Created: 1886
- Number: 141 (as of 2017)
- Subdivisions: Municipalities

In Colombia there is a type of internal subdivision of the departments made up of groupings of neighboring municipalities (and Indigenous territories), called subregions or provinces (the latter term is more historical than legal and is used only in the departments of Santander, Boyacá, and Cundinamarca). They should not be confused with the regions of Colombia.

Subregions are defined as geographically proximate areas for the functional planning of the territory, beyond political-administrative boundaries. In general terms, subregionalization is a tool that contributes to several objectives:

- Better coordination between levels of government and between administrative sectors;
- Greater efficiency in planning processes by optimizing investments according to the functional relationships among territories, so that projects achieve a scale larger than the municipal level and have a greater impact;
- Facilitating dialogue between the different levels of government and citizens.

Subregions are almost nonexistent in the Amazon natural region and the eastern Llanos (the exceptions being the department of Meta).

== List of subregions ==
Subregions			Name	Map
Location	Department	Title	Name	Map
	Antioquia	Subregions (Subregiones)	Bajo Cauca	
	Antioquia	Subregions (Subregiones)	Magdalena Medio	
	Antioquia	Subregions (Subregiones)	Northeastern (Nordeste)	
	Antioquia	Subregions (Subregiones)	Northern (Norte)	
	Antioquia	Subregions (Subregiones)	Western (Occidente)	
	Antioquia	Subregions (Subregiones)	Eastern (Oriente)	
	Antioquia	Subregions (Subregiones)	Southwestern (Suroeste)	
	Antioquia	Subregions (Subregiones)	Urabá	
	Antioquia	Subregions (Subregiones)	Aburrá Valley (Valle de Aburrá)	
	Atlántico	Provinces (Provincias)	Center-East (Centro-Oriente)	
	Atlántico	Provinces (Provincias)	North (Norte)	
	Atlántico	Provinces (Provincias)	South (Sur)	
	Atlántico	Provinces (Provincias)	Western (Occidente)	
	Bolívar	Development zones (Zonas de desarrollo)	Depresión Momposina	
	Bolívar	Development zones (Zonas de desarrollo)	Dique	
	Bolívar	Development zones (Zonas de desarrollo)	Loba	
	Bolívar	Development zones (Zonas de desarrollo)	Magdalena Medio	
	Bolívar	Development zones (Zonas de desarrollo)	Mojana	
	Bolívar	Development zones (Zonas de desarrollo)	Montes de María	
	Boyacá	Provinces (Provincias)	Central (Centro)	
	Boyacá	Provinces (Provincias)	Frontier District (Cubará) (Distrito Fronterizo)	
	Boyacá	Provinces (Provincias)	Gutiérrez	
	Boyacá	Provinces (Provincias)	La Libertad	
	Boyacá	Provinces (Provincias)	Lengupá	
	Boyacá	Provinces (Provincias)	Márquez	
	Boyacá	Provinces (Provincias)	Neira	
	Boyacá	Provinces (Provincias)	Northern (Norte)	
	Boyacá	Provinces (Provincias)	Western (Occidente)	
	Boyacá	Provinces (Provincias)	Eastern (Oriente)	
	Boyacá	Provinces (Provincias)	Ricaurte	
	Boyacá	Provinces (Provincias)	Sugamuxi	
	Boyacá	Provinces (Provincias)	Tundama	
	Boyacá	Provinces (Provincias)	Valderrama	
	Boyacá	Provinces (Provincias)	Special Handling Zone (Puerto Boyacá) (Zona de Manejo Especial)	
	Caldas	Subregions (Subregiones)	Lower Western (Bajo Occidente)	
	Caldas	Subregions (Subregiones)	Magdalena Caldense	
	Caldas	Subregions (Subregiones)	Northern (Norte)	
	Caldas	Subregions (Subregiones)	Southcentral (Centrosur)	
	Caldas	Subregions (Subregiones)	Upper Eastern (Alto Oriente)	
	Caldas	Subregions (Subregiones)	Upper Western (Alto Occidente)	
	Cauca	Regions (Regiones)	Central (Centro)	
	Cauca	Regions (Regiones)	Northern (Norte)	
	Cauca	Regions (Regiones)	Western (Occidente)	
	Cauca	Regions (Regiones)	Eastern (Oriente)	
	Cauca	Regions (Regiones)	Southern (Sur)	
	Chocó	Subregions (Subregiones)	Atrato	
	Chocó	Subregions (Subregiones)	Darien (Darién)	
	Chocó	Subregions (Subregiones)	North Pacific (Pacífico Norte)	
	Chocó	Subregions (Subregiones)	South Pacific (Pacífico Sur)	
	Chocó	Subregions (Subregiones)	San Juan	
	Córdoba	Subregions (Subregiones)	Upper Sinu (Alto Sinú)	
	Córdoba	Subregions (Subregiones)	Lower Sinu (Bajo Sinú)	
	Córdoba	Subregions (Subregiones)	Center (Centro)	
	Córdoba	Subregions (Subregiones)	Coastline (Costanera)	
	Córdoba	Subregions (Subregiones)	Middle Sinu (Medio Sinú)	
	Córdoba	Subregions (Subregiones)	Savannah (Sabanas)	
	Córdoba	Subregions (Subregiones)	San jorge (Provincia/Province)	
	Cundinamarca	Provinces (Provincias)	Almeidas	
	Cundinamarca	Provinces (Provincias)	Central Magdalena (Magdalena Centro)	
	Cundinamarca	Provinces (Provincias)	Central Savanna (Sabana Centro)	
	Cundinamarca	Provinces (Provincias)	Eastern (Oriente)	
	Cundinamarca	Provinces (Provincias)	Gualivá	
	Cundinamarca	Provinces (Provincias)	Guavio	
	Cundinamarca	Provinces (Provincias)	Lower Magdalena (Bajo Magdalena)	
	Cundinamarca	Provinces (Provincias)	Medina	
	Cundinamarca	Provinces (Provincias)	Rionegro	
	Cundinamarca	Provinces (Provincias)	Soacha	
	Cundinamarca	Provinces (Provincias)	Sumapaz	
	Cundinamarca	Provinces (Provincias)	Tequendama	
	Cundinamarca	Provinces (Provincias)	Ubaté	
	Cundinamarca	Provinces (Provincias)	Upper Magdalena (Alto Magdalena)	
	Cundinamarca	Provinces (Provincias)	Western Savanna (Sabana Occidente)	
	Huila	Subregions (Subregiones)	Central Subregion (Subcentro)	
	Huila	Subregions (Subregiones)	Northern Subregion (Subnorte)	
	Huila	Subregions (Subregiones)	Western Subregion (Suboccidente)	
	Huila	Subregions (Subregiones)	Southern Subregion (Subsur)	
	La Guajira	Provinces (Provincias)	Northern (Norte) Province	
	La Guajira	Provinces (Provincias)	Southern (Sur) or Padilla Province	
	Meta	Subregions (Subregiones)	Ariari	
	Meta	Subregions (Subregiones)	Capital	
	Meta	Subregions (Subregiones)	Piedemonte	
	Meta	Subregions (Subregiones)	Río Meta	
	Nariño	Provinces (Provincias)	Juanambú (La Unión)	
	Nariño	Provinces (Provincias)	Obando (Ipiales)	
	Nariño	Provinces (Provincias)	Pasto	
	Nariño	Provinces (Provincias)	Tumaco-Barbacoas	
	Nariño	Provinces (Provincias)	Túquerres	
	Norte de Santander	Subregions (Subregiones)	Central (Centro)	
	Norte de Santander	Subregions (Subregiones)	Northern (Norte)	
	Norte de Santander	Subregions (Subregiones)	Western (Occidente)	
	Norte de Santander	Subregions (Subregiones)	Eastern (Oriente)	
	Norte de Santander	Subregions (Subregiones)	Southwestern (Sur-occidente)	
	Norte de Santander	Subregions (Subregiones)	Southeastern (Sur-oriente)	
	Santander	Provinces (Provincias)	Comunera	
	Santander	Provinces (Provincias)	García-Rovira	
	Santander	Provinces (Provincias)	Guanentá	
	Santander	Provinces (Provincias)	Mares	
	Santander	Provinces (Provincias)	Metropolitana	
	Santander	Provinces (Provincias)	Soto	
	Santander	Provinces (Provincias)	Vélez	
	Sucre	Subregions (Subregiones)	La Mojana	
	Sucre	Subregions (Subregiones)	Montes de María	
	Sucre	Subregions (Subregiones)	Morrosquillo	
	Sucre	Subregions (Subregiones)	Sabanas	
	Sucre	Subregions (Subregiones)	San Jorge	
	Tolima	Provinces (Provincias)	Ibagué	
	Tolima	Provinces (Provincias)	Nevados	
	Tolima	Provinces (Provincias)	Northern (Norte)	
	Tolima	Provinces (Provincias)	Eastern (Oriente)	
	Tolima	Provinces (Provincias)	Southern (Sur)	
	Tolima	Provinces (Provincias)	Southeastern (Suroriente)	
	Valle del Cauca	Subregions (Subregiones)	Central (Centro)	
	Valle del Cauca	Subregions (Subregiones)	Northern (Norte)	
	Valle del Cauca	Subregions (Subregiones)	Western (Occidente)	
	Valle del Cauca	Subregions (Subregiones)	Eastern (Oriente)	
	Valle del Cauca	Subregions (Subregiones)	Southern (Sur)	

== See also ==
- Administrative divisions of Colombia
- Natural regions of Colombia
- Departments of Colombia
- Municipalities of Colombia
