= Montecristo, Bolívar =

Coordinates: 8.29944°N 74.4756°W

- Municipality and town
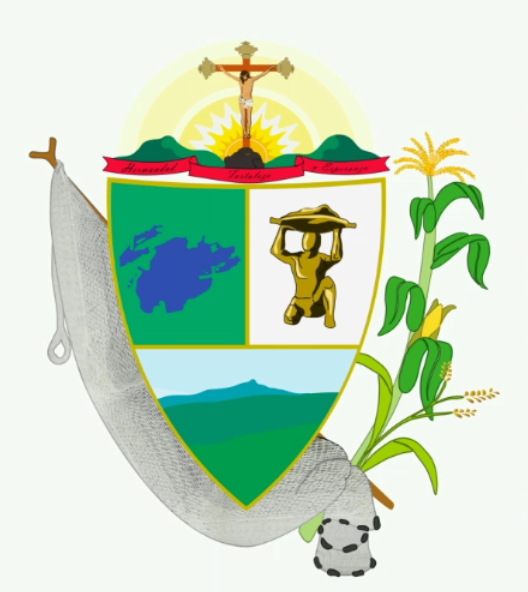
- Coat of arms

- Location of the municipality and town of Montecristo, Bolívar in the Bolívar Department of Colombia
- Country: Colombia
- Department: Bolívar Department

Population (Census 2018)
  - Total: 13,470
- Time zone: UTC-5 (Colombia Standard Time)

Montecristo is a town and municipality located in the Bolívar Department, northern Colombia.

== Climate ==
Montecristo has a very wet tropical monsoon climate (Am) with very heavy rainfall from April to November and moderate to heavy rainfall from December to March.

Climate data for Montecristo
Month	Jan	Feb	Mar	Apr	May	Jun	Jul	Aug	Sep	Oct	Nov	Dec	Year
Mean daily maximum °C (°F)	32.2 (90.0)	32.9 (91.2)	33.0 (91.4)	32.8 (91.0)	31.8 (89.2)	31.6 (88.9)	31.8 (89.2)	31.5 (88.7)	31.5 (88.7)	31.2 (88.2)	31.3 (88.3)	31.8 (89.2)	32.0 (89.5)
Daily mean °C (°F)	27.7 (81.9)	28.2 (82.8)	28.5 (83.3)	28.6 (83.5)	27.8 (82.0)	27.9 (82.2)	27.6 (81.7)	27.6 (81.7)	27.4 (81.3)	27.2 (81.0)	27.4 (81.3)	27.6 (81.7)	27.8 (82.0)
Mean daily minimum °C (°F)	23.3 (73.9)	23.6 (74.5)	24.1 (75.4)	24.4 (75.9)	23.9 (75.0)	24.2 (75.6)	23.5 (74.3)	23.7 (74.7)	23.3 (73.9)	23.3 (73.9)	23.6 (74.5)	23.5 (74.3)	23.7 (74.7)
Average rainfall mm (inches)	54.9 (2.16)	86.6 (3.41)	121.1 (4.77)	291.8 (11.49)	555.4 (21.87)	404.0 (15.91)	425.0 (16.73)	531.1 (20.91)	493.0 (19.41)	550.4 (21.67)	483.3 (19.03)	240.7 (9.48)	4,237.3 (166.84)
Average rainy days	4	5	7	14	20	20	20	22	20	22	20	11	185
