= Talaigua Nuevo =

Coordinates: 9.30694°N 74.5686°W

- Municipality and town
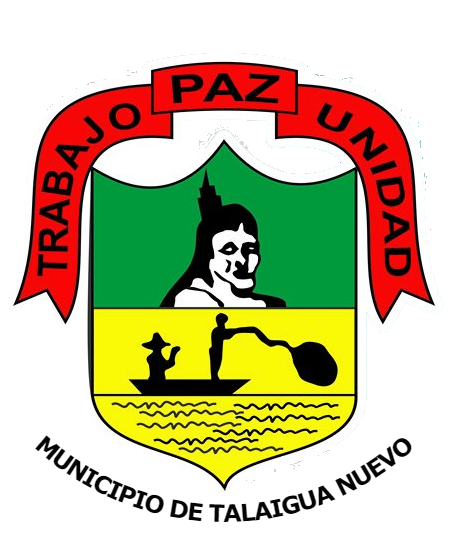
- Coat of arms

- Location of the municipality and town of Talaiga Nuevo in the Bolívar Department of Colombia
- Country: Colombia
- Department: Bolívar Department

Area
  - Total: 261 km^{2} (101 sq mi)

Population (Census 2018)
  - Total: 12,845
  - Density: 49.2/km^{2} (127/sq mi)
- Time zone: UTC-5 (Colombia Standard Time)
- Website: http://www.talaiguanuevo-bolivar.gov.co/

Talaigua Nuevo (Spanish pronunciation: [taˈlajɣwa ˈnweβo]) is a town and municipality located in the Bolívar Department, northern Colombia.
