= Majagual, Sucre =

Coordinates: 8°30′N 74°40′W

Majagual
- Municipality and town
- Flag

- Location of the municipality and town of Majagual in the Sucre Department of Colombia.
- Country: Colombia
- Department: Sucre Department

Area
  - Municipality and town: 826 km^{2} (319 sq mi)
- Elevation: 28 m (92 ft)

Population (2015)
  - Municipality and town: 33,258
  - Density: 40.3/km^{2} (104/sq mi)
  - Urban: 10,883
- Time zone: UTC-5 (Colombia Standard Time)

Majagual (Spanish pronunciation: [maxaˈɣwal]) is a town and municipality located in the Sucre Department, northern Colombia.

== Climate ==
Majagual has a tropical monsoon climate (Am) with

Climate data for Majagual, elevation 20 m (66 ft), (1981–2010)
Month	Jan	Feb	Mar	Apr	May	Jun	Jul	Aug	Sep	Oct	Nov	Dec	Year
Mean daily maximum °C (°F)	33.9 (93.0)	34.2 (93.6)	34.4 (93.9)	34.2 (93.6)	33.7 (92.7)	33.7 (92.7)	33.8 (92.8)	33.6 (92.5)	33.3 (91.9)	32.8 (91.0)	33.2 (91.8)	33.6 (92.5)	33.7 (92.7)
Daily mean °C (°F)	29.1 (84.4)	29.1 (84.4)	29.5 (85.1)	29.3 (84.7)	29.1 (84.4)	29.2 (84.6)	29.1 (84.4)	29.0 (84.2)	28.9 (84.0)	28.6 (83.5)	28.9 (84.0)	28.9 (84.0)	29.1 (84.4)
Mean daily minimum °C (°F)	21.8 (71.2)	21.7 (71.1)	22.2 (72.0)	21.9 (71.4)	21.8 (71.2)	21.9 (71.4)	21.7 (71.1)	21.7 (71.1)	21.5 (70.7)	21.7 (71.1)	22.0 (71.6)	21.9 (71.4)	21.8 (71.2)
Average precipitation mm (inches)	17.6 (0.69)	24.6 (0.97)	51.1 (2.01)	162.3 (6.39)	317.4 (12.50)	310.2 (12.21)	349.3 (13.75)	393.3 (15.48)	275.1 (10.83)	383.1 (15.08)	297.1 (11.70)	114.7 (4.52)	2,695.8 (106.13)
Average precipitation days	2	3	4	9	14	13	14	15	14	16	14	7	122
Average relative humidity (%)	86	85	83	85	86	86	84	86	87	87	86	86	86
Mean monthly sunshine hours	210.8	189.1	164.3	135.0	139.5	162.0	192.2	186.0	150.0	151.9	168.0	179.8	2,028.6
Mean daily sunshine hours	6.8	6.7	5.3	4.5	4.5	5.4	6.2	6.0	5.0	4.9	5.6	5.8	5.6
Source: Instituto de Hidrologia Meteorologia y Estudios Ambientales

== Population ==
- Population (2018) - 10,205
- Area- 1.385 km²
- Population Density (2018) - 7,369/km²
- Annual Population Change (2005 → 2018) - 0.26%

Climate data for Majagual
Month	Jan	Feb	Mar	Apr	May	Jun	Jul	Aug	Sep	Oct	Nov	Dec	Year
Mean daily maximum °C (°F)	32.5 (90.5)	33.4 (92.1)	33.4 (92.1)	33.3 (91.9)	32.2 (90.0)	32.0 (89.6)	32.2 (90.0)	32.0 (89.6)	31.7 (89.1)	31.5 (88.7)	31.5 (88.7)	32.0 (89.6)	32.3 (90.2)
Daily mean °C (°F)	27.6 (81.7)	28.1 (82.6)	28.3 (82.9)	28.3 (82.9)	27.8 (82.0)	27.8 (82.0)	27.6 (81.7)	27.5 (81.5)	27.2 (81.0)	27.2 (81.0)	27.4 (81.3)	27.5 (81.5)	27.7 (81.8)
Mean daily minimum °C (°F)	22.8 (73.0)	22.8 (73.0)	23.3 (73.9)	23.5 (74.3)	23.4 (74.1)	23.6 (74.5)	23.0 (73.4)	23.1 (73.6)	22.8 (73.0)	23.0 (73.4)	23.4 (74.1)	23.1 (73.6)	23.2 (73.7)
Average rainfall mm (inches)	17.6 (0.69)	24.6 (0.97)	51.1 (2.01)	162.3 (6.39)	317.4 (12.50)	310.2 (12.21)	349.3 (13.75)	393.3 (15.48)	275.1 (10.83)	383.1 (15.08)	297.1 (11.70)	114.7 (4.52)	2,695.8 (106.13)
Average rainy days	2	3	4	9	14	13	14	15	14	16	14	7	125
Average relative humidity (%)	86	85	83	85	86	86	84	86	87	87	86	86	86
Mean monthly sunshine hours	210.8	189.2	164.3	135.0	139.5	162.0	192.2	186.0	150.0	151.9	168.0	179.8	2,028.7
Mean daily sunshine hours	6.8	6.7	5.3	4.5	4.5	5.4	6.2	6.0	5.0	4.9	5.6	5.8	5.6
Source: IDEAM
