= Bolívar Department =

Department of Colombia

Department of Bolívar Departamento de Bolívar
- Department
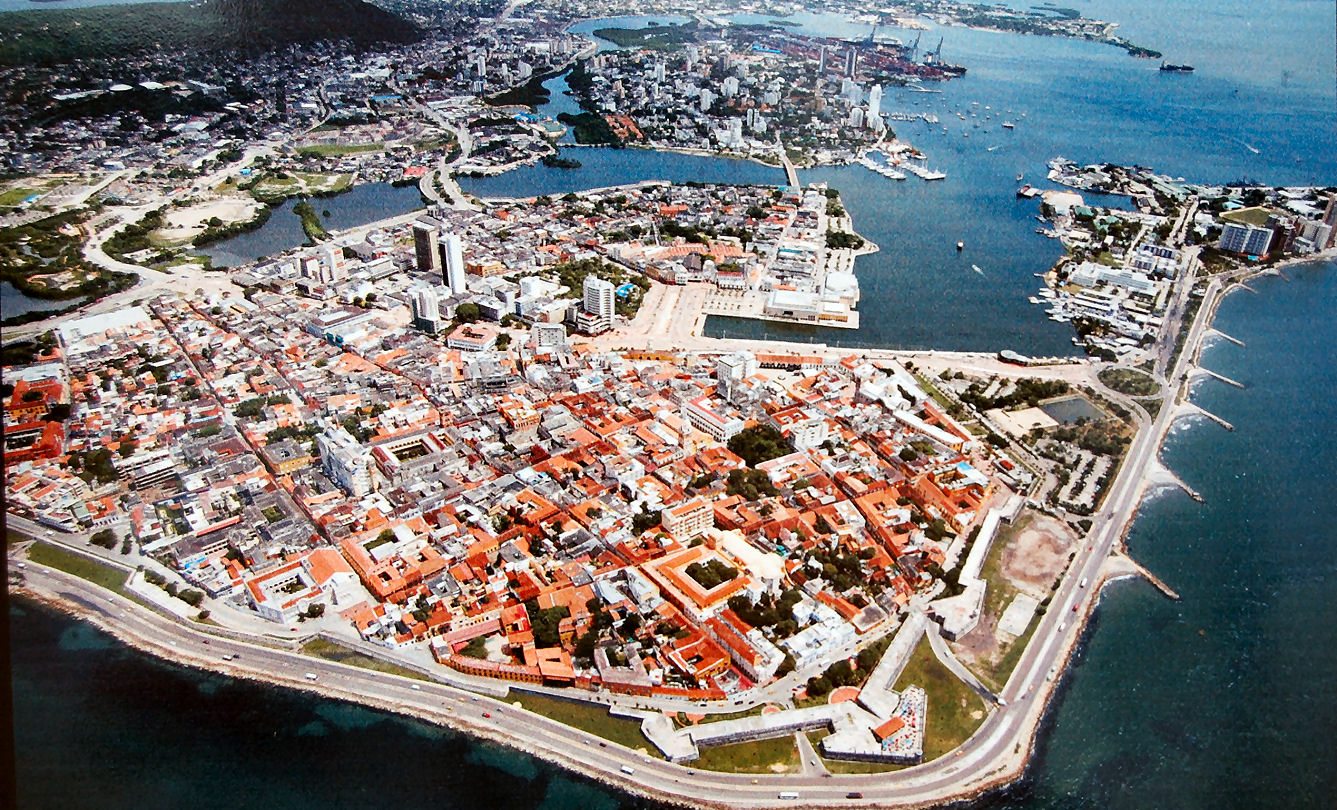
- Cartagena from the air

- Flag Coat of arms
- Motto: Ab Ordine Libertas (Latin: From order comes freedom)
- Anthem: Himno de Bolívar
- Bolívar shown in red

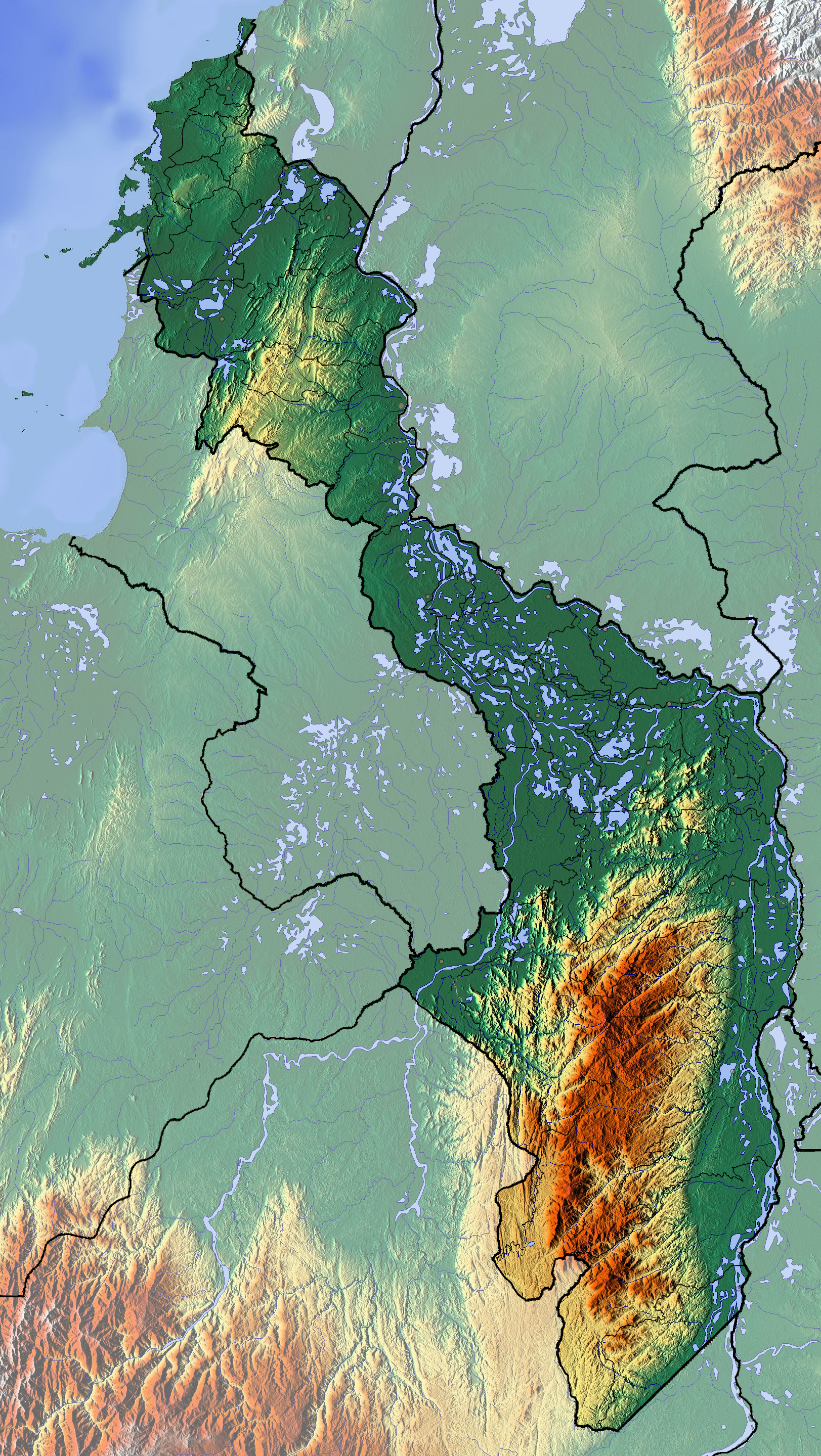
- Topography of the department
- Coordinates: 10°24′N 75°30′W
- Country: Colombia
- Region: Caribbean Region
- Department: 1886
- Province: 1533
- Capital: Cartagena

Government
  - Governor: Yamil Hernando Arana Padauí

Area
  - Total: 25,978 km^{2} (10,030 sq mi)
  - Rank: 14th

Population (2018)
  - Total: 2,070,110
  - Rank: 7th
  - Density: 79.687/km^{2} (206.39/sq mi)

GDP
  - Total: COP 51,404 billion (US$ 12.1 billion)
- Time zone: UTC-05
- ISO 3166 code: CO-BOL
- Provinces: 6
- Municipalities: 46
- HDI: 0.777 high · 13th of 33
- Website: www.bolivar.gov.co

Bolívar (Spanish pronunciation: [boˈliβaɾ]) is a department of Colombia. It was named after one of the original nine states of the United States of Colombia. It is located in the north of the country, extending roughly north–south from the Caribbean coast at Cartagena near the mouth of the Magdalena River, then south along the river to a border with Antioquia Department. The departments of Sucre and Córdoba are located to the west, and Atlántico Department to the north and east (most of the border formed by the Canal del Dique). Across the Magdalena River to the east is Magdalena Department. The flag of the department bears a resemblance to the flag of Lithuania.

Its capital is Cartagena de Indias. Other important cities include Magangué, El Carmen de Bolívar and Turbaco.

== Subregions and municipalities ==
=== North ===
1. Cartagena
2. Clemencia
3. Santa Catalina
4. Santa Rosa
5. Turbaco
6. Turbana
7. Villanueva

=== Dique ===
1. Arjona
2. Arroyohondo
3. Calamar
4. Mahates
5. San Cristobal
6. San Estanislao

=== Montes de Maria ===
1. El Carmen de Bolívar
2. Córdoba
3. El Guamo
4. María La Baja
5. San Jacinto
6. San Juan Nepomuceno
7. Soplaviento
8. Zambrano

=== Mojana ===
1. Achí
2. Magangué
3. Montecristo
4. Pinillos
5. San Jacinto del Cauca
6. Tiquisio

=== Mompox Island ===
1. Cicuco
2. Hatillo de Loba
3. Margarita
4. Santa Cruz de Mompox
5. San Fernando
6. Talaiga Nuevo

=== Loba ===
1. Altos del Rosario
2. Barranco de Loba
3. El Peñón
4. Norosí
5. Regidor
6. Rio Viejo
7. San Martín de Loba

=== Magdalena Medio ===
1. Arenal
2. Cantagallo
3. Morales
4. San Pablo
5. Santa Rosa del Sur
6. Simití

== History ==
In today's villages of Maria La Baja, Sincerín, El Viso, and Mahates and Rotinet, excavations have uncovered the remains of maloka-type buildings, directly related to the early Puerto Hormiga settlements.

Historical population
Year	Pop.	±%
1938	763,782	—
1951	924,082	+21.0%
1964	693,759	−24.9%
1973	817,838	+17.9%
1985	1,288,985	+57.6%
1993	1,702,188	+32.1%
2005	1,878,993	+10.4%
2018	2,070,110	+10.2%

== Flag ==
The flag of the department consists of three horizontal stripes of yellow, green and red (similar to the flag of Lithuania).

== Miscellaneous ==
- Postage stamps of Bolívar
- List of Caribbean islands#Bolívar Department
