= Coat of arms of Bolívar State =

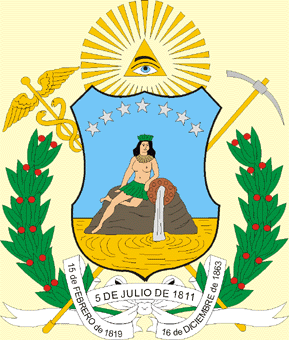
The coat of arms of the state of Bolívar

The coat of arms of Bolívar State is divided horizontally into two fields in blue and gold. The blue color in the upper part symbolizes the sky, while the gold in the lower part signifies the auriferous riches of the Guayana Region. In the upper part of the blue field forming an arch are eight stars representing the seven provinces that were considered in 1811 to declare the National Independence with the eighth star symbolizing the Guayana Province.

The lower field depicts a gold river representing the Orinoco and rising out of it, a big rock known as the Middle Rock, on top of which an indigenous female is resting her left arm on a clay vessel, pouring water on the river representing the endless flow of the Orinoco.

To the left of the blue field, behind the shield, is a caduceus representing commerce, and to the right, in the same position, a pickaxe symbolizing work and the mining industry. Crowning the coat of arms, with a silver background, is a radiant triangle with an eye in the middle, representing the scrutiny of Providence protecting the Bolívar State territory.

Olive branches, emblem of peace, border the coat of arms. Where they meet below the shield is a golden ribbon with the following dates: in the center, 5 July 1811, date of the Declaration of Venezuelan Independence; to the left, 15 February 1819, date of the Installation of the Congress of Angostura and to the right, 16 December 1863, date of the Incorporation of Guayana into the Federal Republic.
