= San Jacinto del Cauca =

Coordinates: 8.25°N 74.7167°W

- Municipality and town
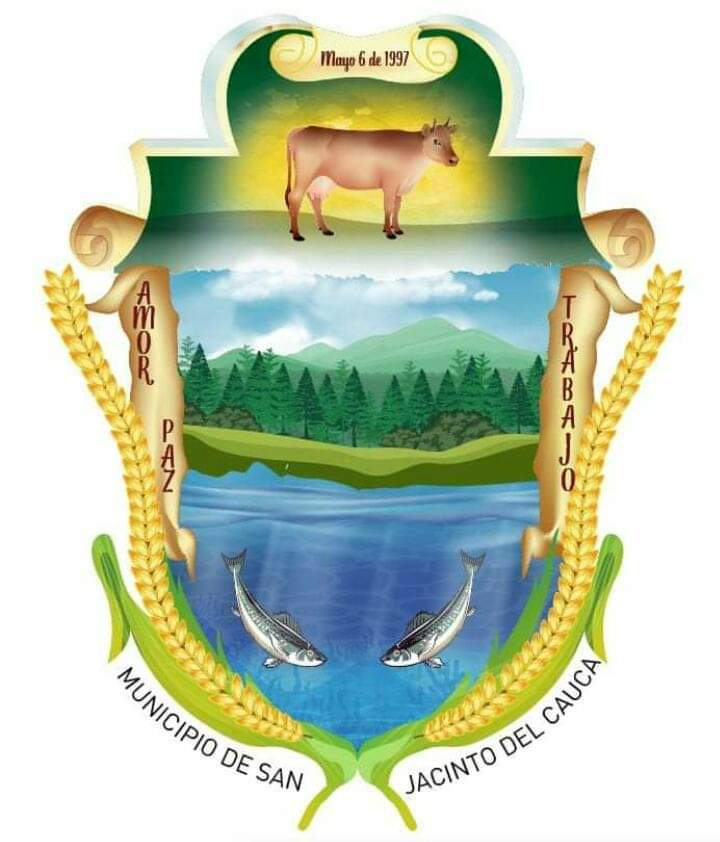
- Flag Coat of arms

- Location of the municipality and town of San Jacinto del Cauca in the Bolívar Department of Colombia
- Country: Colombia
- Department: Bolívar Department

Population (Census 2018)
  - Total: 8,079
- Time zone: UTC-5 (Colombia Standard Time)

San Jacinto del Cauca is a town and municipality located in the Bolívar Department, northern Colombia.

== Climate ==
San Jacinto del Cauca has a tropical monsoon climate (Am) with moderate to heavy rainfall from December to April and very heavy rainfall from May to November.

Climate data for San Jacinto del Cauca
| Month | Jan | Feb | Mar | Apr | May | Jun | Jul | Aug | Sep | Oct | Nov | Dec | Year |
|---|---|---|---|---|---|---|---|---|---|---|---|---|---|
| Mean daily maximum °C (°F) | 32.4 (90.3) | 33.2 (91.8) | 33.4 (92.1) | 33.0 (91.4) | 31.9 (89.4) | 31.7 (89.1) | 31.9 (89.4) | 31.6 (88.9) | 31.5 (88.7) | 31.3 (88.3) | 31.4 (88.5) | 31.7 (89.1) | 32.1 (89.8) |
| Daily mean °C (°F) | 28.0 (82.4) | 28.5 (83.3) | 28.7 (83.7) | 28.6 (83.5) | 27.9 (82.2) | 27.9 (82.2) | 27.8 (82.0) | 27.7 (81.9) | 27.5 (81.5) | 27.5 (81.5) | 27.6 (81.7) | 27.7 (81.9) | 28.0 (82.3) |
| Mean daily minimum °C (°F) | 23.6 (74.5) | 23.8 (74.8) | 24.1 (75.4) | 24.3 (75.7) | 24.0 (75.2) | 24.2 (75.6) | 23.8 (74.8) | 23.9 (75.0) | 23.6 (74.5) | 23.7 (74.7) | 23.9 (75.0) | 23.8 (74.8) | 23.9 (75.0) |
| Average rainfall mm (inches) | 44.5 (1.75) | 63.5 (2.50) | 93.1 (3.67) | 248.7 (9.79) | 445.5 (17.54) | 422.2 (16.62) | 459.6 (18.09) | 614.4 (24.19) | 434.1 (17.09) | 491.7 (19.36) | 489.8 (19.28) | 187.4 (7.38) | 3,994.5 (157.26) |
| Average rainy days | 3 | 3 | 4 | 9 | 14 | 14 | 15 | 17 | 13 | 15 | 15 | 7 | 129 |
Source: IDEAM
