= Time in Colombia =

Overview of Colombian time zone

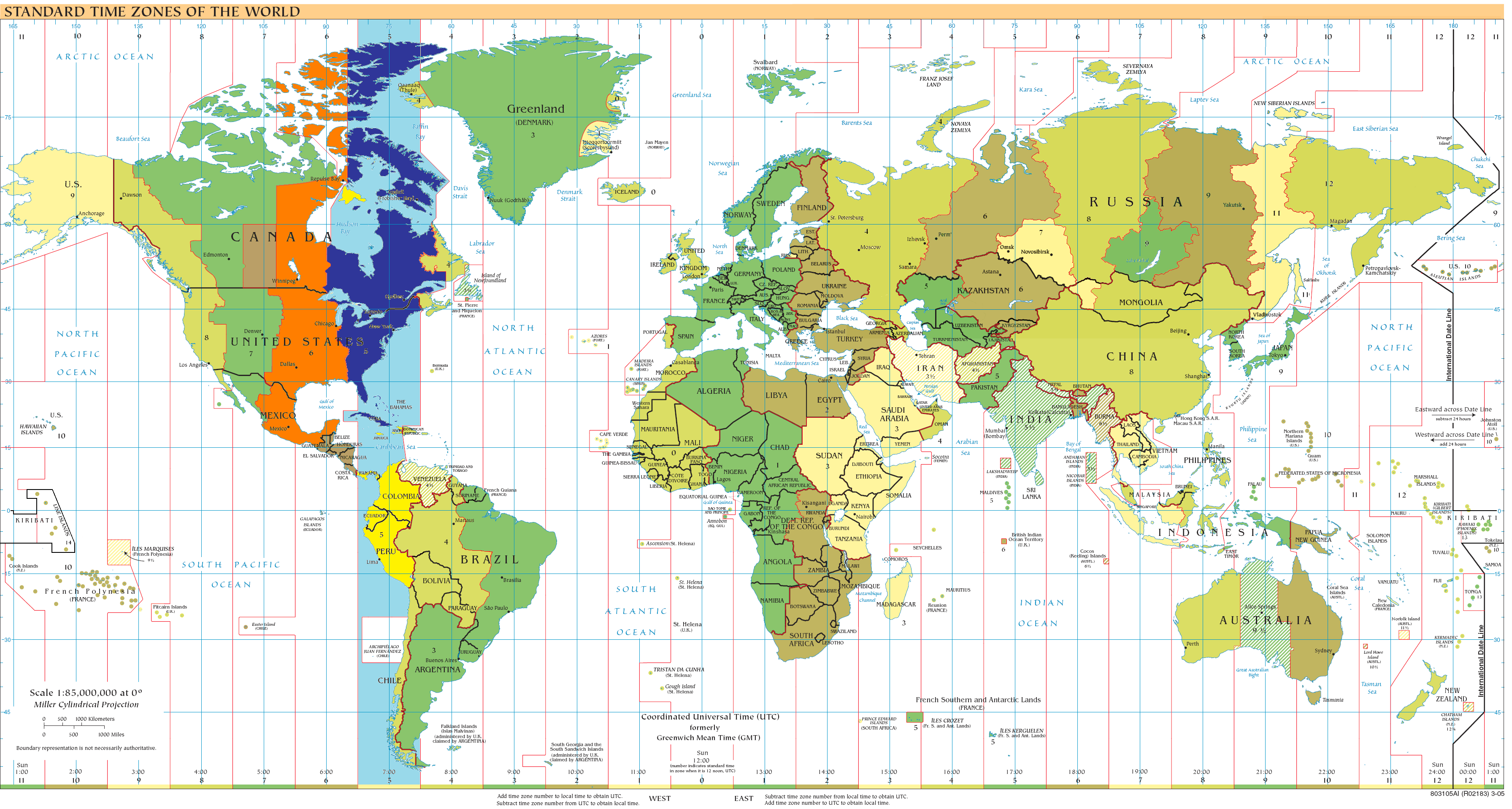
A map of the world's timezones with Colombia Time (UTC−05:00) highlighted

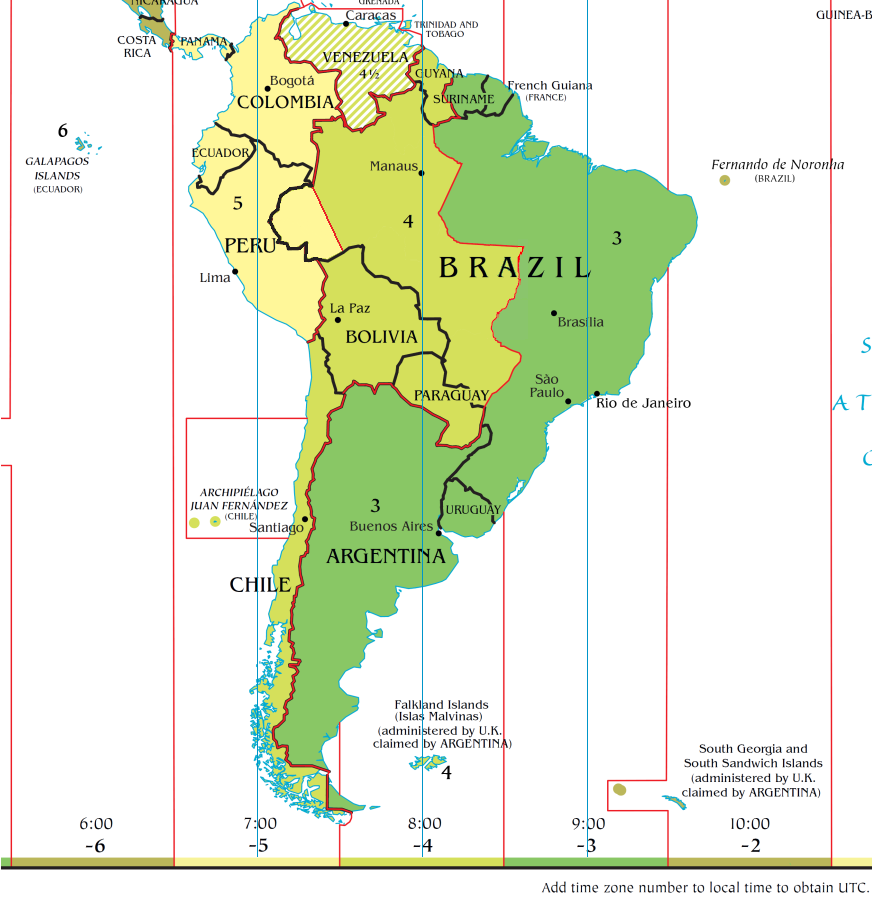
Map of South America with time zones as of 2014.

Colombia has one time zone, Colombia Time (COT), which is located in the UTC−05:00 zone, 5 hours behind Coordinated Universal Time (UTC). Its standard time zone abbreviation is COT.

== Legal time ==
The legal time of Colombia is an official service of the Colombian State that establishes the local time of the country. It is taken directly from the primary standards of the Time and Frequency Laboratory of the National Metrology Institute. It is set 5 hours behind UTC (UTC-5).

Prior to Colombia introducing a nationwide time zone in 1914, Bogotá mean time (UTC−04:56:16) was used.

== Background and basis ==
Colombia adopted, through Law 91 of 1914, the international Convention for the creation of an International Time Bureau and, consequently, the GMT -5 time zone for the entire national territory. In 1982, through Decree 2707 of 16 September issued by the Ministry of Economic Development, it adopted Coordinated Universal Time (UTC) minus 5 hours as its official time.

The legal time service was based on the need to define a time standard that would govern the measurement of time unambiguously and uniformly throughout continental Colombian territory, located approximately between the 66° and 79° west longitude meridians. Thus, the 74° west longitude meridian, which passes through Bogotá (the country's capital), was established as the determinant of the time for the entire territory, which lies almost entirely within a single time zone.

== Daylight saving time ==
Historically, Colombia has used daylight saving time in its territory only once. Between 1992 and 1993, during the government of then-president César Gaviria Trujillo, the reduction in water reserves in reservoirs, worsened by the El Niño phenomenon, led to a national energy crisis that forced the authorities to implement a series of scheduled power outages that lasted more than a year. To counteract the negative effects of the electricity cuts, the government decided to set the country's clocks forward one hour, moving from UTC −5 to UTC −4 at midnight on 2 May 1992. The measure, informally known as "Hora Gaviria", lasted nine months. Since then, Colombia has not readopted daylight saving time and maintains its official UTC−5 time year-round.

The idea of adopting daylight saving time had already been proposed in 1979 by the then Minister of Mines, Alberto Vásquez Restrepo.

== Legal aspect ==
The National Metrology Institute has as its purpose, in accordance with article 2 of Decree 1277 of 1994, the following:

1. To supply the environmental knowledge, data, and information required by the Ministry of the Environment and other entities of the National Environmental System (Sina).

2. To carry out the gathering and management of scientific and technical information on the ecosystems that form part of the country's environmental heritage.

3. To establish the technical bases for classifying and zoning the use of the national territory for the purposes of environmental planning and land-use management.

4. To obtain, store, analyze, study, process, and disseminate basic information on hydrology, hydrogeology, meteorology, basic geography on biophysical aspects, geomorphology, soils, and plant cover for the management and use of the Nation's biophysical resources, in particular those aspects that, prior to Law 99 of 1993, were carried out by the Colombian Institute of Hydrology, Meteorology and Land Adaptation (Himat), the Institute for Research in Geosciences, Mining and Chemistry (Ingeominas), and the Geography Sub-directorate of the Agustín Codazzi Geographic Institute (Igac).

5. To establish and put into operation the national oceanographic, tide-gauge, meteorological, and hydrological infrastructures to provide information, forecasts, warnings, and advisory services to the community.

6. To monitor the Nation's biophysical resources, especially with regard to their contamination and degradation, as needed for decision-making by environmental authorities.

7. To carry out studies and research on natural resources, particularly those related to forest resources and soil conservation, and other activities that, prior to Law 99 of 1993, were carried out by the Forestry and Development Sub-directorates of the National Institute of Natural Resources and the Environment (Inderena).

8. To carry out the hydrology and meteorology studies and research that, prior to Law 99 of 1993, were carried out by Himat.

9. To carry out environmental studies and research to understand the causes and effects of socioeconomic development on nature, its processes, the environment, and renewable natural resources, and to propose environmental indicators.

10. To gather, store, process, analyze, and disseminate data, and to obtain or produce the information and knowledge necessary to monitor the interaction of social, economic, and natural processes, and to propose technological alternatives, systems, and models of sustainable development.

11. To direct and coordinate the Environmental Information System and operate it in collaboration with the scientific entities linked to the Ministry of the Environment, with the corporations, and with other entities of the Sina.

12. To provide information services within its areas of competence to the users who require them.

== Use ==
This time is taken directly from the reference standards of the INM's Time and Frequency Laboratory, in accordance with the provisions of item 14 of article 6 of Decree 4175 of 2011, the regulation that creates the INM and separates it from the Superintendency of Industry and Commerce. It is used in every legal context where the establishment of a time is required, whether contracts, tenders, auctions, among others. It can be checked by the general public on the website horalegal.inm.gov.co.

== IANA time zone database ==
In the IANA time zone database Colombia has the following time zone:

- America/Bogota (CO)

== See also ==
- Daylight saving time in Colombia
- Time zone
- Coordinated Universal Time
- Daylight saving time around the world
- List of UTC offsets
