= List of national monuments of Colombia =

This is a list of national monuments in Colombia.

== Amazonas ==
=== Mirití-Paraná ===
- Cahuinarí National Park

=== Leticia ===
- Amacayacu National Park

== Antioquia ==
=== Abejorral ===
- Historical center of Abejorral

=== Amagá ===
- Salinas station
- Minas railway station
- Nicanor Restrepo railway station
- Quiebra railway station
- The Forge of Amagá

==== Amagá (Camilo Restrepo) ====
- Camilo Restrepo railway station

==== Amagá (Piedecuesta) ====
- Piedecuesta railway station

=== Angelópolis ===
- Angelópolis railway station

=== Barbosa ===
- Barbosa railway station

==== Barbosa (El Hatillo) ====
- El Hatillo railway station

==== Barbosa (Isaza) ====
- Isaza railway station

==== Barbosa (Popalito) ====
- Popalito railway station

=== Bello ===
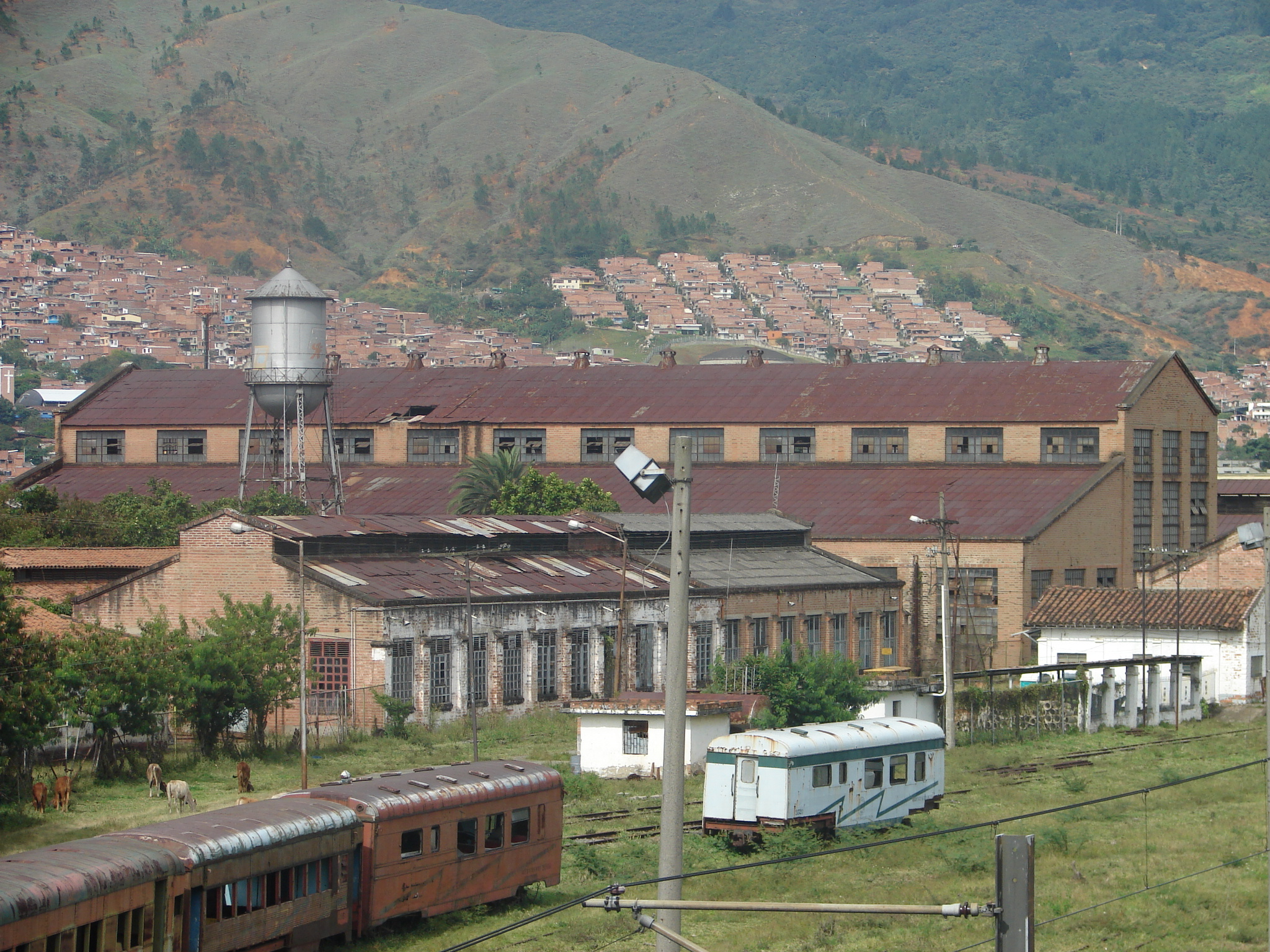
Bello railway station

- Chapel of Nuestra Señora del Rosario in Hatoviejo, the temple where Marco Fidel Suárez was baptized
- Bello railway station

=== Caldas ===
- Caldas railway station

=== Caracolí ===
- Caracolí railway station
- F. Gómez railway station

=== Cisneros ===
- Cisneros railway station

==== Cisneros (El Limón) ====
- El Limón railway station

=== Concepción ===
- Central sector

=== Copacabana ===
- Copacabana railway station

=== Don Matías ===
- House where Luis López de Mesa was born, located on the principal plaza of Bolívar and Páez streets

=== Envigado ===
- House where José Manuel Restrepo Vélez was born. School of the arts and letters. History academy. Carrera 55 calle 52a and calle 54
- Escuela Fernando González. Model school. Carrera 40 38a-08 south
- Envigado station

=== Fredonia ===
- Fredonia station
- Jonas station

=== Fredonia (Los Palomos) ===
- Palomos station

=== Frontino – Urrao – Abriaquí ===
- Las Orquídeas National Natural Park

=== Girardota ===
- Girardota station

=== Guarne ===
- Santa Ana Chapel and its plazoleta. Conjunto urbano de la chapel de Santa Ana y la plazoleta con las construcciones que la enmarcan

=== Itagüí ===
- Itagüí railway station

=== Jardín ===
- Principal Park, declared a national monument in 1985
- Basilica of the Immaculate Conception, declared a national monument in 1980

=== Jericó ===
- Casa de los misioneros claretianos
- Estación del ferrocarril Jericó
- Hacienda "La Botero". Vereda puente iglesias
- Hogar juvenil campesino. antigua escuela complementaria
- Iglesia de San Francisco
- Normal nacional
- Santuario del Corazón de María
- Sector histórico y planos. Algunos sectores urbanos de Jericó. Sector de interés delimitado

=== La Ceja ===
- Chapel of Our Lady of Chiquinquirá

=== La Estrella ===
- Ancon station

=== La Estrella (la tablaza) ===
- Estación del ferrocarril La Tablaza

=== Marinilla ===
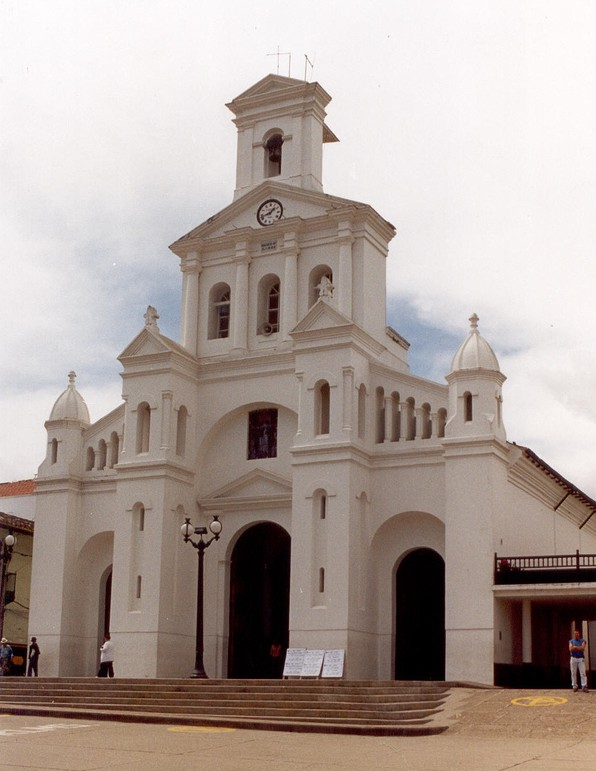
Iglesia de Nuestra Señora de la Asunción in Marinilla

- Historical center. Urban center of Marinilla. Sector histórico sin delimitar. Decreto 264 del 12-ii-1963 (declara)

=== Medellín ===
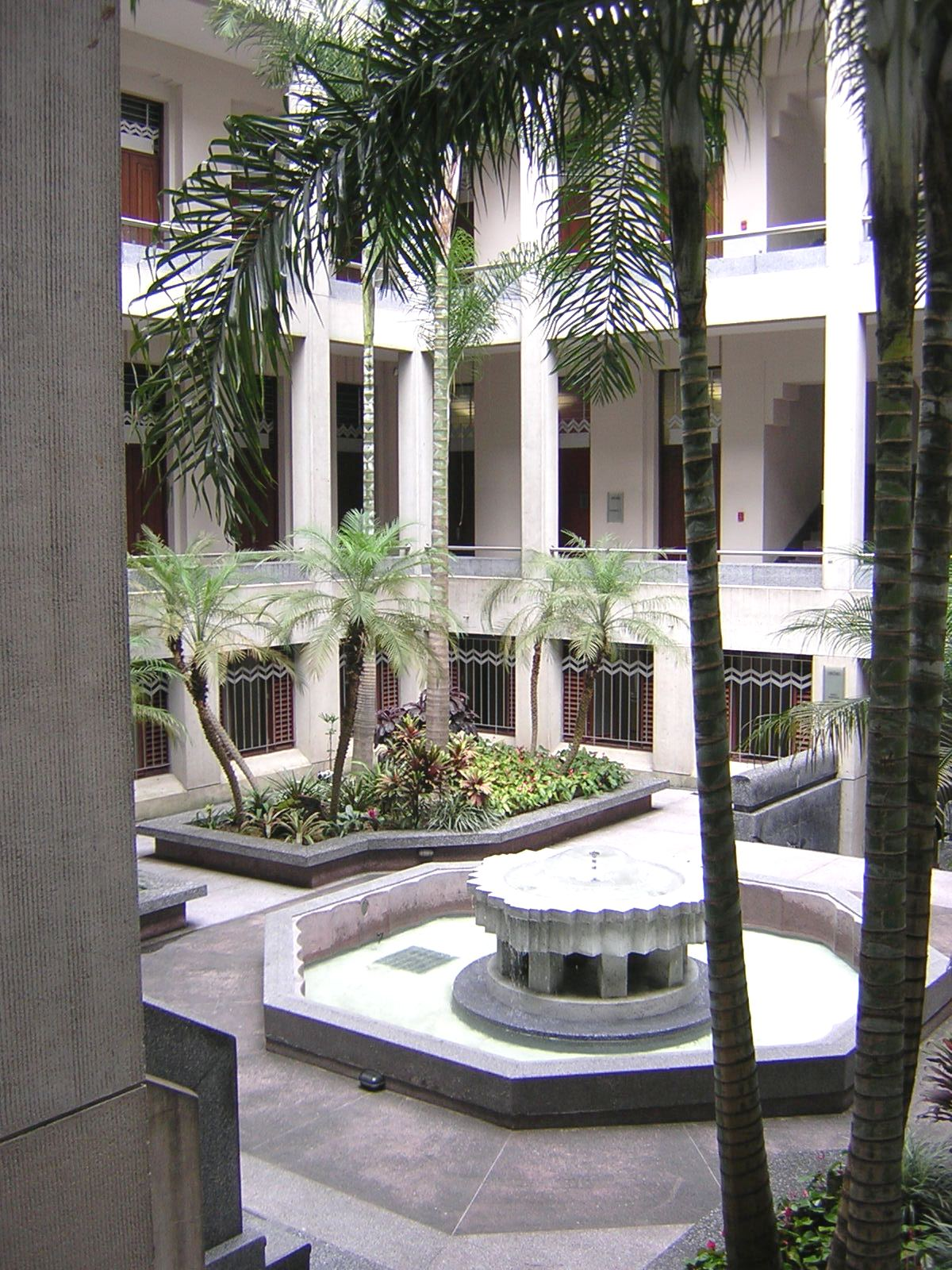
North patio of the Museum of Antioquia

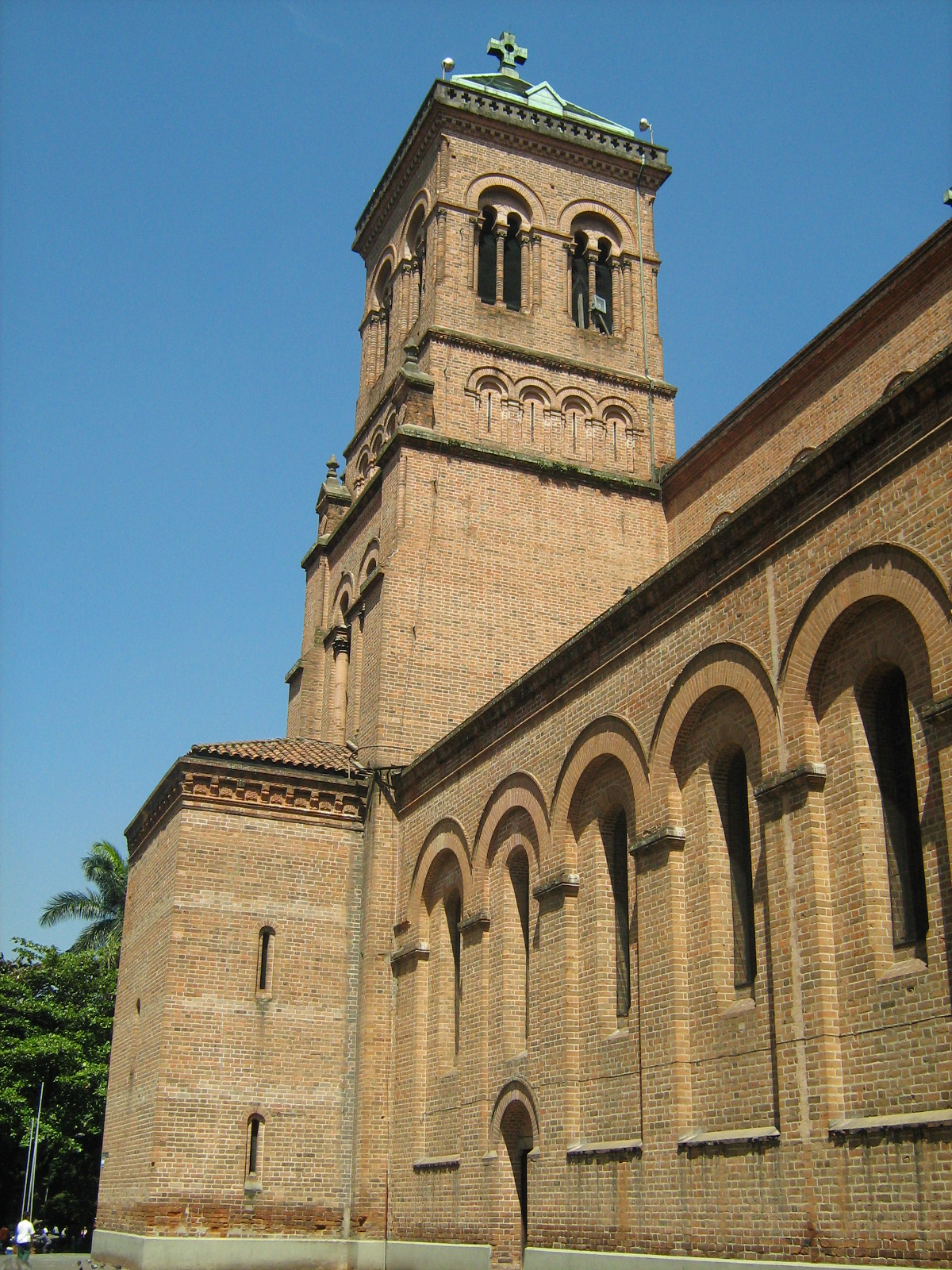
West tower of the Metropolitan Cathedral of Medellín

- Enrique Olaya Herrera Airport. Carrera 65a 13-157
- Antiguo Palacio Municipal de Medellín. Hoy sede del Museum of Antioquia. Carrera 52 52-43. Carabobo street between De Greiff Avenue and Calibio
- House where Francisco Antonio Zea was born. Casa natal del prócer de la Independencia Francisco Antonio Zea. Calle 51 54–63 54–65 54–71 carrera Tenerife
- Casa Museo Maestro Pedro Nel Gómez. Carrera 51b 85-24
- Metropolitan Cathedral of Medellín. Calle 48 56–82
- San Pedro Cemetery Museum. Carrera 51 68-68
- Cementerio de San Lorenzo
- Ecopark El Volador Hill. yacimientos arqueológicos localizados en el ecoparque, cerro el volador
- Edificio Carre. Carrera 52 44b-21
- Edificio de la Biblioteca Central de la Universidad Nacional sede Medellín. Antigua Escuela Departamental de Agronomía. Sector de Otrabanda carrera 64 calle 65
- El Bosque railway station – 53 and 77 Streets
- Cisneros railway station
- Medellín station. Carrera 52 43-31. Decreto 746 24-iv-1996 (declara)
- Facultad de Minas Universidad Nacional. Edificios M3 y M5 de la facultad de Minas de la Universidad Nacional. Comuna Robledo. Carrera 80 calle 65
- Hospital San Vicente de Paúl. Calle 64 a calle 67 carrera 51 a carrera 52.
- Iglesia de Jesús Nazareno. Carrera 52 61-30
- Iglesia de la Veracruz. Calle 51 52-18
- Basilica of Our Lady of Candelaria. Calle 51 49–51
- Iglesia de Nuestra Señora de Los Dolores. Calle 65a Robledo park
- Palacio de Bellas Artes. sociedad de Mejoras Públicas de Medellín. Carrera 42 52-33. Avenida La Playa con Córdoba esquina norte
- Palacio de la Gobernación. Palacio de Calibio. Palacio de la Cultura Rafael Uribe Uribe. Carrera 51 51-01 carrera 52 calle 52 calle 53
- Templo de la parroquia de El Calvario. Carrera 48a 77-4
- Iglesia del Sagrado Corazón de Jesús. Carrera 57a 44a-15. Avenida Guayaquil
- Edificios de Morfología y de Bioquímica de la facultad de Medicina. Universidad de Antioquia, facultad de Medicina. Calle 51d 62–67 62-01
- Edificio San Ignacio historical seat of the University of Antioquia. Plazuela San Ignacio calle 49 carrera 44

==== Medellín (Santa Elena) ====
- Zona arqueológica de Piedras Blancas. Cuenca alta de la quebrada Piedras Blancas. Altos del Rosario. Laguna camino de cieza matasanos

Medellín – Santo Domingo – Santiago – Cisneros – El Limón

- Túnel de la quiebra

=== Montebello ===
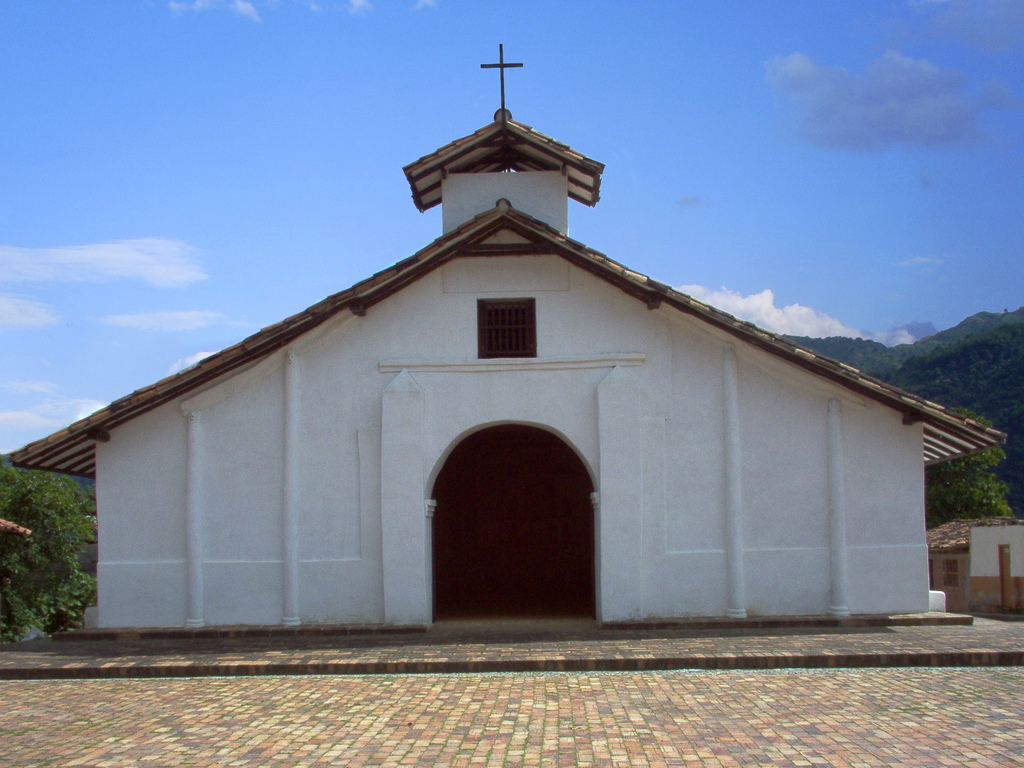
Chapel de Nuestra Señora de la Candelaria, Montebello

- Chapel de Nuestra Señora de la Candelaria, corregimiento de Sabaletas

=== Puerto Berrío ===
- Estación de Los Monos
- Estación del ferrocarril Cabañas

==== Puerto Berrío (Calera) ====
- Estación del ferrocarril Calera

==== Puerto Berrío (Cristalina) ====
- Estación del ferrocarril Cristalina

==== Puerto Berrío (Grecia) ====
- Estación del ferrocarril Grecia

==== Puerto Berrío (Malena) ====
- Malena station
- P/n del puerto station
- Puerto Berrío station
- Sabaletas station

==== Puerto Berrío (Virginias) ====
- Virginias station
- Hotel Magdalena. Batallón del ejército

=== Puerto Nare (La Magdalena) ===
- Argelia station
- Estación del ferrocarril Nápoles
- Estación del ferrocarril Puerto Nare

==== Puerto Nare (La Sierra) ====
- La Sierra station

=== Puerto Triunfo ===
- Cocorná station
- Puerto Pita station
- Puerto Triunfo station
- Totumos station

=== Rionegro ===
- Sector antiguo de la ciudad. Sector histórico sin delimitar

=== Sabaneta ===
- House where Dr. José Félix Restrepo was born
- Sabaneta station

=== San Roque ===
- Caramanta station
- Conejo station
- Guacharacas station
- Neftalí Sierra
- San Jorge station

==== San Roque (Providencia) ====
- Estación del ferrocarril Providencia

==== San Roque (San José Nuestra Señora) ====
- Estación del ferrocarril San José

=== Santa Bárbara (La Pintada) ===
- Estación del ferrocarril La Pintada

=== Santa Fe de Antioquia (Olaya) ===
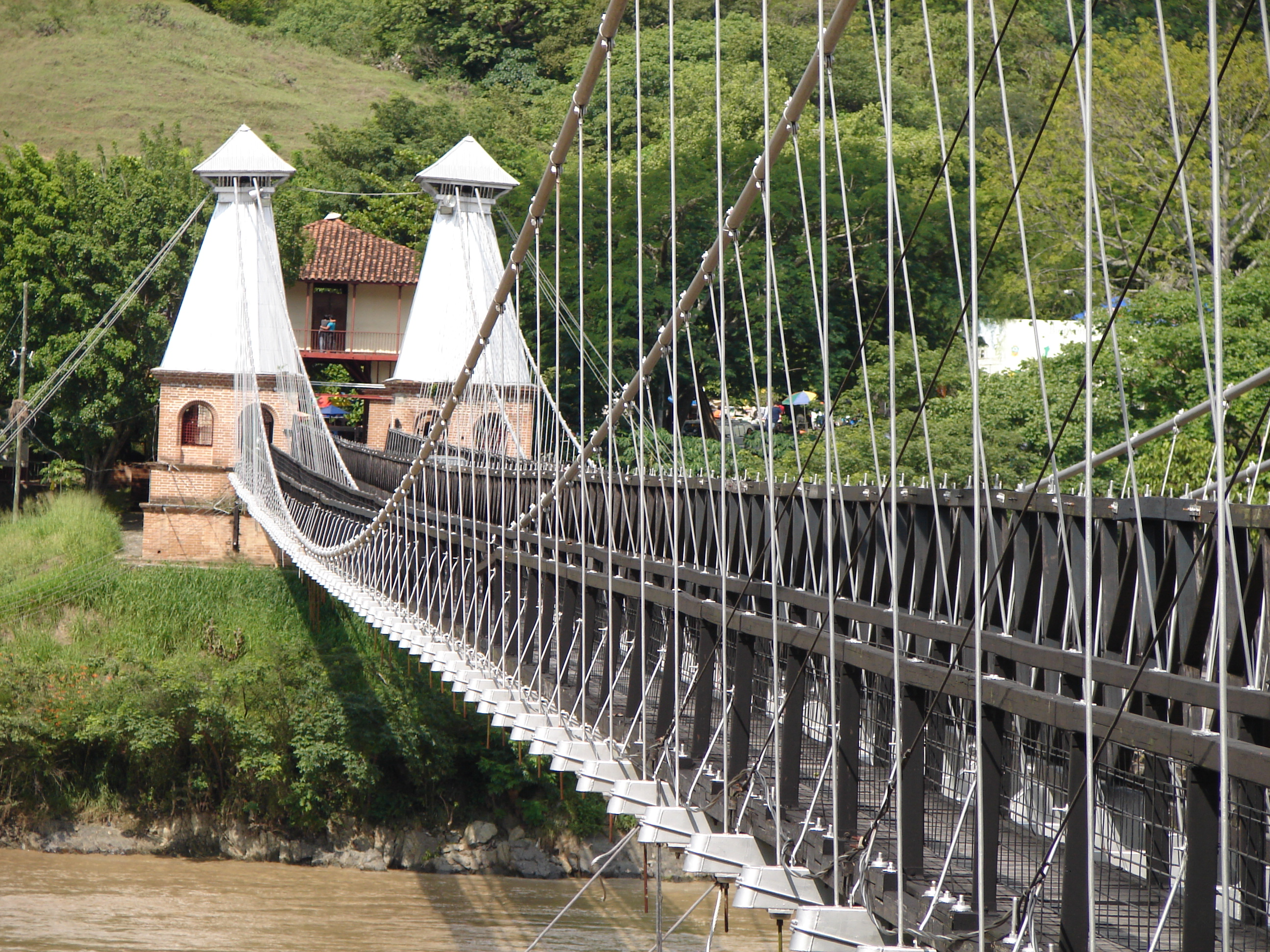
Puente de Occidente on the outskirts of Santa Fe de Antioquia

- Puente de Occidente (Bridge of the West)
- Sector histórico reglamentación. Sector histórico delimitado. El área que va desde la carrera del asilo (cra. 16) hasta el callejón del gallinazo (cra 5) y desde la calle de la amargura (calle 11)hasta las calles real-calle mocha (calle 9)y calle del medio (calle 10)

=== Santo Domingo ===
- House where Tomas Carrasquilla was born. Plaza principal calle 13 14–44

==== Santo Domingo (Botero) ====
- Estación del ferrocarril Botero

==== Santo Domingo (Santiago) ====
- Estación del ferrocarril Porce
- Estación del ferrocarril Santiago
- Estación del ferrocarril Santo Domingo

==== Santo Domingo (Porcecito) ====
- Estación del ferrocarril Porcecito

=== Sonsón ===
- Estación del ferrocarril La Miel

=== Tarso ===
- Estación del ferrocarril Tarso

=== Titiribí ===
- Circo teatro Girardot. Carrera Santander 21–60

=== Venecia ===
- Estación del ferrocarril San Julián
- Estación del ferrocarril Venecia

==== Venecia (Bolombolo) ====
- Estación del ferrocarril Tulio Ospina
- Estación del ferrocarril Bolombolo

=== Yolombó ===
- Estación del ferrocarril Sofía

=== Antioquia – Córdoba ===
San Jerónimo – Ituango – Dabeiba – Peque – Ayapel – Montelíbano

- Parque nacional natural Paramillo

== Atlántico ==
=== Barranquilla ===
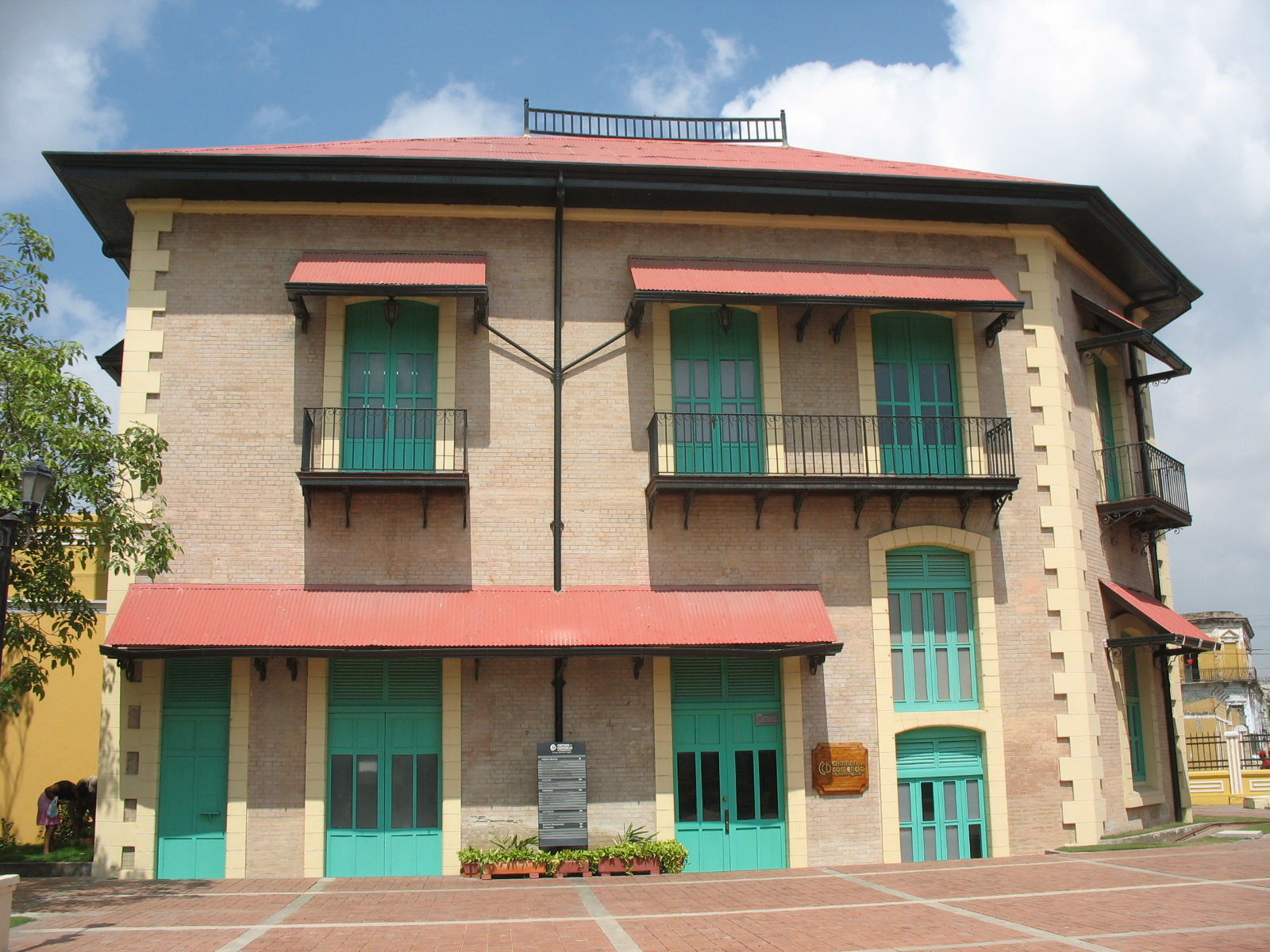
Antique Montoya Station

- Antigua estación del ferrocarril Montoya. Calle 39 carrera 50b
- Antiguo aeropuerto de Veranillo. Vía 40 con calle 58
- Antiguo Banco Dugand. Edificio de Telecom. Calle 32 43-27
- Barranquilla's Carnival
- Romelio Martínez Stadium
- Casa "La Cueva". Avenida 20 de julio, barrio Boston, Barranquilla
- Centro Histórico
- Edificio Caja de Crédito Agrario. Carrera 45 33-10
- Edificio de la Aduana. Calle 36 a calle 40 carrera 46. Vía 40 36–135
- Edificio Nacional. Centro cívico. Calle 44 44–80. Calle 40 44-30
- Hotel El Prado. Carrera 54 70-10
- Sector comprendido por los barrios El Prado, Bellavista y una parte de Altos del Prado
- Templo de San Roque. Iglesia de San Roque. Calle 30 36–41 36-25 36–45

== Bogotá D.C. ==
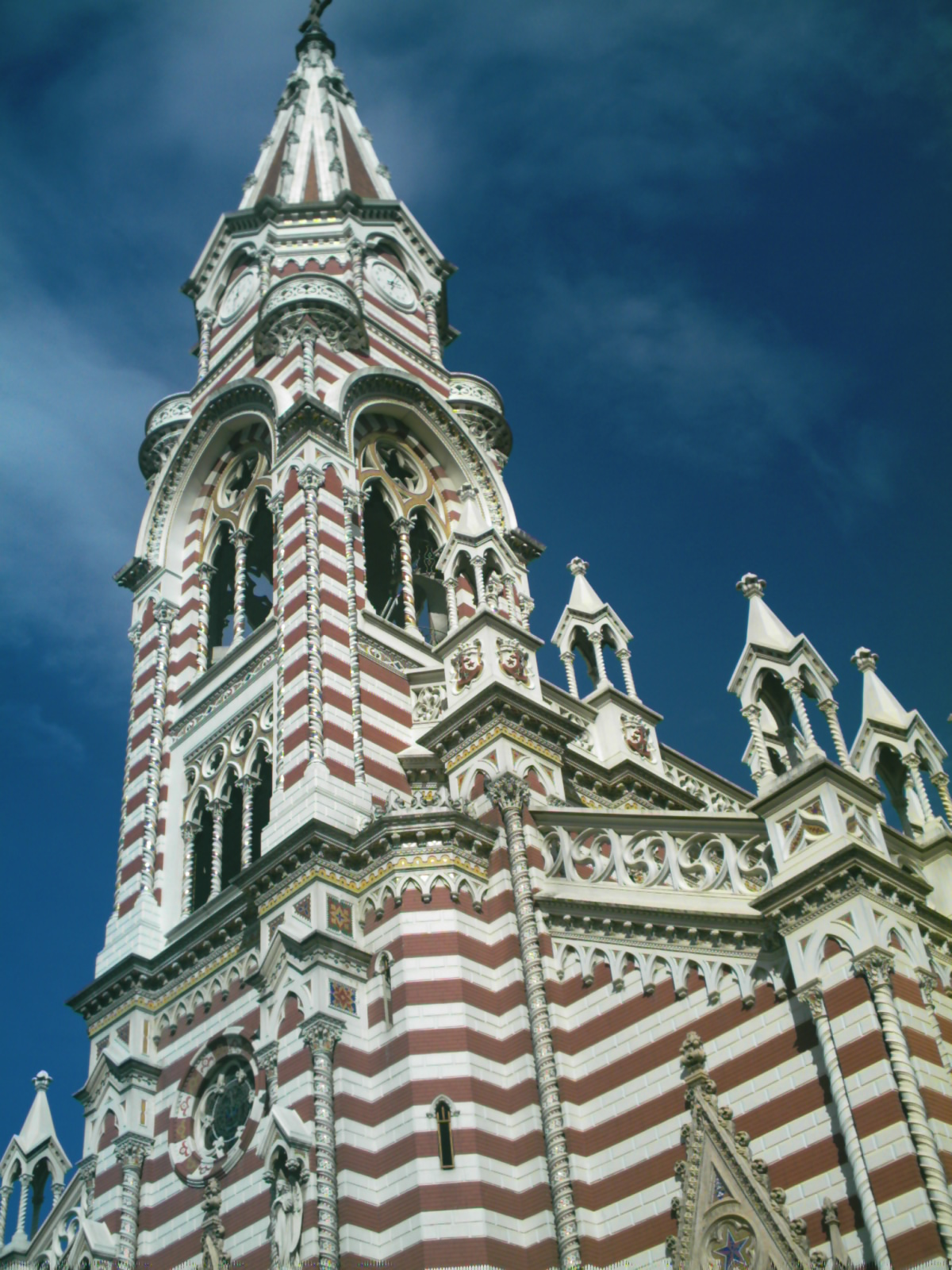
Sanctuary of Our Lady of Carmen, designed by Giovanni Buscaglione

- Palacio Liévano
- National Library of Colombia
- Capitolio Nacional
- Silva Poetry House
- Casa de Moneda de Colombia
- Caro and Cuervo Institute
- Primary Cathedral of Bogotá
- Central Cemetery of Bogotá
- Gimnasio Moderno
- Gold Museum, Bogotá
- Hospital San Juan de Dios, Bogota
- Colonial Museum of Bogotá

== Bolívar ==
=== Calamar ===
- Calamar railway station

=== Cartagena ===
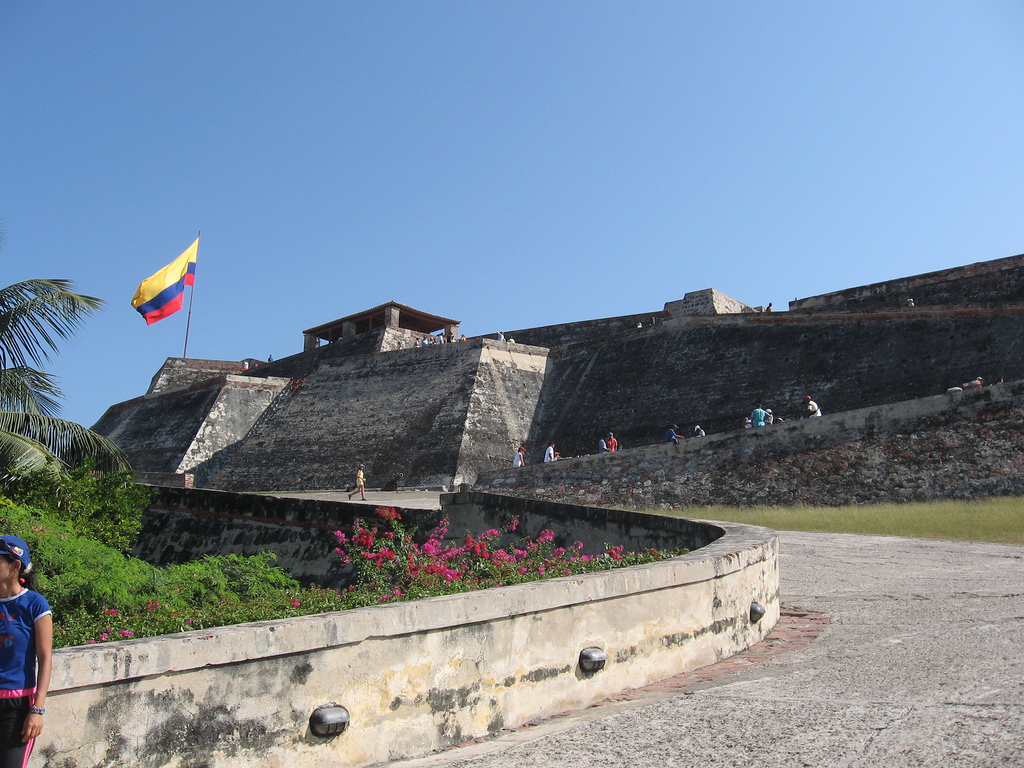
San Felipe Castle in Cartagena

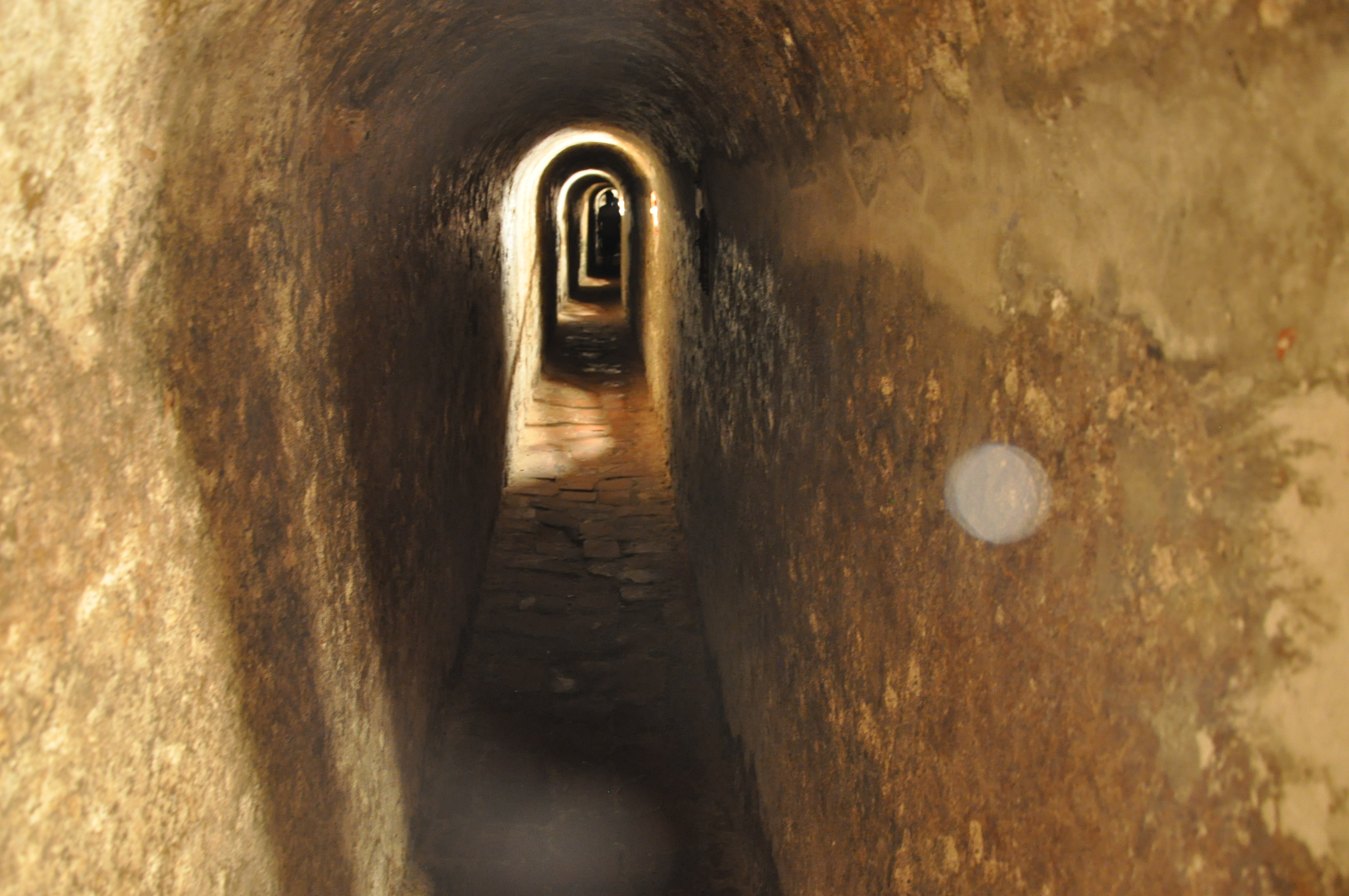
Tunnel

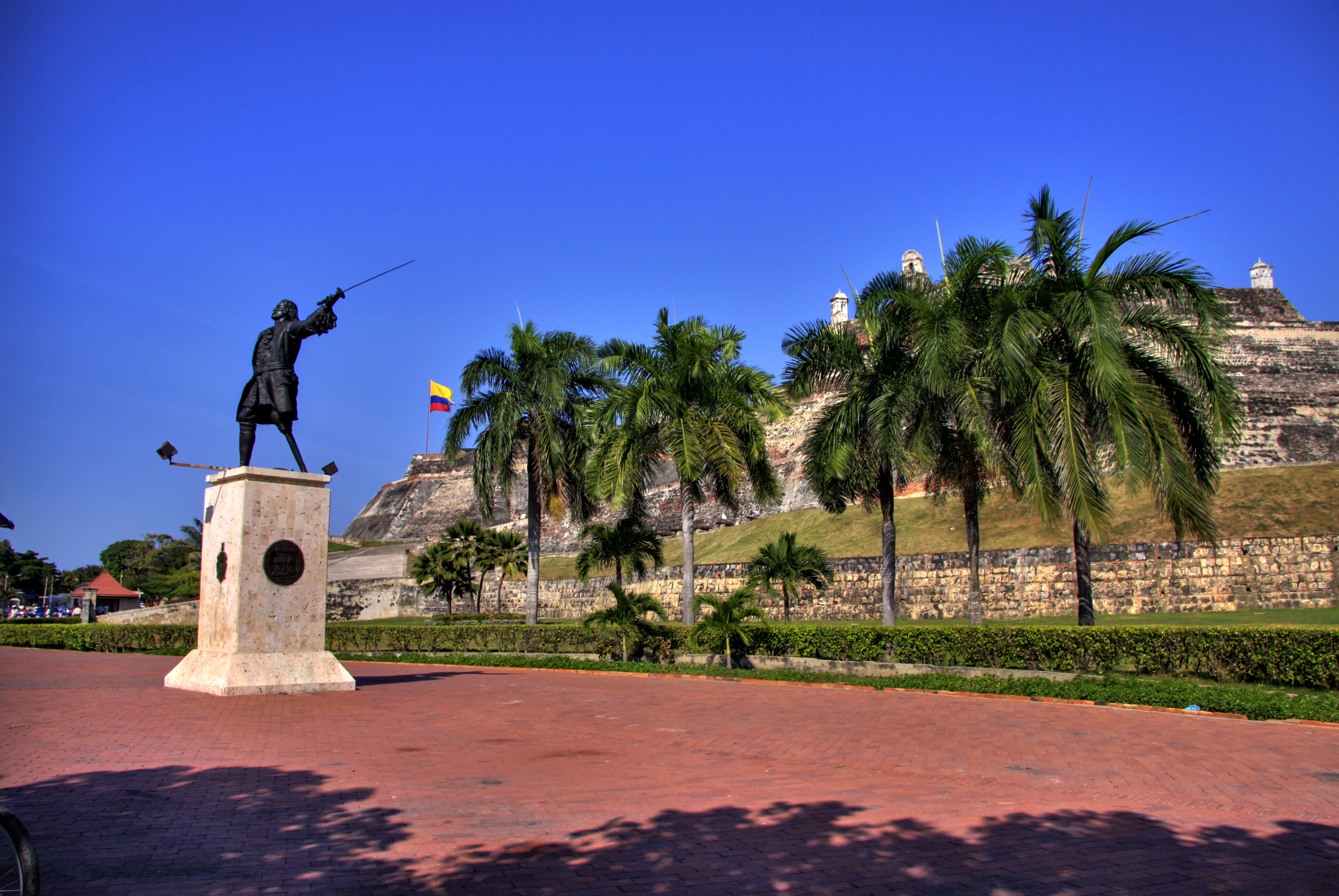
Blas de Lezo statue

- Port, Fortresses and Group of Monuments, Cartagena – Listed as a UNESCO World Heritage Site.
- Baluarte de Chambacú
- Baluarte de la Contaduría (or San Juan)
- Baluarte de La Merced
- Baluarte de San Ignacio
- Baluarte de San Francisco Javier
- Baluarte de Santiago
- Baluarte de Santo Domingo
- Baluarte de Santa Cruz
- Baluarte de Santa Clara
- Baluarte de San Lucas
- Baluarte de Santa Catalina.
- Baluarte de San Pedro Mártir
- Baluarte de Santa Teresa
- Baluarte de Santa Bárbara
- Baluarte de San José
- Baluarte El Reducto
- Batería Ángel San Rafael. Bocachica
- Batería de Santa Bárbara. Bocachica
- Baterías colaterales del fuerte de San Fernando de Bocachica. Bocachica
- Baterías Santiago, San Felipe y Chambacú. Ruinas de las baterías. Isla de Tierrabomba
- Camellón de los Mártires
- Capilla de la orden tercera
- Casa Covo. Calle 28 21-285
- Casa del maestro Alejandro Obregón. Calle de la factoría n° 36–162 barrio centro; centro histórico de Cartagena de indias
- Casa de huéspedes ilustres. Fuerte de Manzanillo
- Casa de la Espriella. Avenida Jiménez o calle 26 21-164
- Casa de la Moneda. Calle de la moneda calle 36 7–63
- Casa de los calabozos. Edificio Kalamari. Actual sede de la Caja Agraria. Calle 33 3–41 3–52. Calle de la Inquisición 3–45 3–49 3–53
- Casa de Lucía Román. Calle 25 24-223
- Casa de Rafael Núñez. Carrera 2#41–89
- Casa del cabildo (hoy gobernación de Bolívar). Palacio de la proclamación. Edificio de la gobernación. Plaza de la proclamación calle 30 4–30
- Casa del marqués de Caldehoyos. Calle de la factoría carrera 3 36–57
- Casa Lucía Méndez. Calle 25 18–20
- Casa Niza. Calle 25 20–106
- Casa Pombo. Avenida Jiménez y Araújo 21-187
- Casa Román. Calle real o calle 25 18–63
- Casa Senador. Calle 28 21–62
- Casa Vélez. Avenida Jiménez o calle 26 20–29
- Castillo de San Felipe de Barajas y las baterías colaterales. Fuerte de San Felipe
- Castillo de Santa Cruz. Ruinas del fuerte de Santa Cruz de Castillo Grande. Actual Club Naval
- Castillo de San Luis. Vestigios del castillo de San Luis. Bocachica
- Claustro o convento de San Diego
- Cementerio de Manga
- Club Cartagena
- Cortina entre baluartes de Santo Domingo y Santa Cruz
- Cortina entre baluartes Santa Cruz y La Merced o plataforma de Ballestas
- Cortina entre baluartes de Santa Clara y Santa Catalina
- Cortina entre baluartes Santa Catalina y San Lucas. Decreto 1911 2-xi-1995 (declara)
- Cortina entre baluartes de San Lucas y San Pedro Mártir. Decreto 1911 2-xi-1995 (declara)
- Cortina entre los baluartes de la Contaduría y San Ignacio
- Cortina entre los baluartes de San Ignacio y San Francisco Javier
- Cortina entre los baluartes San Francisco Javier y Santiago
- Cortina entre los baluartes de Santiago y Santo Domingo
- Cortina entre los baluartes Chambacú y Santa Teresa
- Cortina entre los baluartes de Santa Bárbara y San José
- Cortina entre los baluartes de San José y El Reducto
- Edificio del Banco de la República. Parque de Bolívar n° 3-126 centro histórico de Cartagena de Indias
- Edificio militar Las Bóvedas. Cuartel de Las Bóvedas
- Edificio nacional. Avenida Carlos Escallón 35-27
- El espigón. Baluarte de Santa Catalina
- Ermita de nuestra Señora de Las Mercedes. Decreto 1911 2-xi-1995 (declara)
- Ermita de San Roque. Templo de San Roque. Calle de la media luna – calle del espíritu santo
- Estadio de béisbol 11 de Noviembre. Avenida Pedro de Heredia
- Fuerte batería San José de Bocachica. Isla Draga. Decreto 1911 2-xi-1995 (declara)
- Fuerte de San Fernando de Bocachica. Castillo de San Fernando. Castillete de San Fernando. Isla de Tierrabomba
- San Sebastián del Pastelillo Fort. Actual Club de Pesca. Isla de Manga
- Fuerte del Manzanillo. Fuerte y almacén de provisiones de San Juan de Manzanillo
- Hospital Real de San Carlos (hoy Museo Caval). Museo del Caribe. Hospital de San Juan de Dios. Antiguo colegio de la Compañía de Jesús. Cuartel de infantería de marina
- Hotel Caribe. Avenida 4 6–67
- Iglesia catedral. Catedral de Santa María de Alejandría. Plaza de la proclamación calle del Arzobispo y la calle de los Santos de Piedra, carrera 4 34–42
- Iglesia de la Santísima Trinidad. Plaza de la Trinidad
- Iglesia de Santa Clara. Iglesia y convento de Santa Clara. Claustro de Santa Clara. Antiguo hospital de Santa Clara. Hotel Santa Clara. Calle Stuart con calle del Torno de Santa Clara plaza de San
- Iglesia de Santo Toribio. Plaza Fernández Madrid calle Curato con calle del Sargento Mayor calle 38 6–103
- Iglesia Santa Teresa. Iglesia y convento de Santa Teresa, hoy hotel Santa Teresa. Calle Ricaurte carrera 3 31–59 31-23
- Iglesia y claustro de San Pedro Claver – santuario San Pedro Claver. Iglesia y convento de San Juan de Dios (hoy San Pedro Claver). Iglesia de San Pedro Claver. Calle de San Juan de Dios, plazuela de San Pedro Claver, calle 31 con carrera 4
- Iglesia y convento de Santo Domingo. Plaza de Santo Domingo carrera 3 35-31
- Iglesia y convento de la popa. Cerro de la popa
- Iglesia, convento y claustro de San Francisco. Resolución 1871 28-xii-2000 (declara)
- Los Hornos. Isla de Tierra bomba – población de Bocachica. Decreto 1911 2-xi-1995 (declara)
- Muralla entre los baluartes de La Merced y Santa Clara
- Parque Bolívar. Parque Bolívar – casa de la Inquisición. Decreto 1911 2-xi-1995 (declara)
- Parque del Centenario
- Parque nacional natural corales del Rosario
- Plataforma de San Ángel. Ruinas de la plataforma de San Ángel. Plataforma San Ángel. Isla de Tierrabomba
- Plaza de toros de La Serrezuela. Calle de la serrezuela con playa de San Carlos
- Puente de la Media Luna, vestigios del puente
- Puerta principal (hoy del reloj). Puerta del puente o del reloj. Torre del reloj. Plaza de los coches
- Sala de armas del ramo de artillería (hoy alcaldía de Cartagena). Antigua administración de la real aduana. Casa alcaldía. Plaza de la aduana calle 30 4–30
- Teatro Adolfo mejía. Antiguo teatro Heredia. Antigua iglesia de la merced. Plaza de la merced con calle de la merced
- Tribunal y cárceles de la inquisición. Palacio de la inquisición. Parque Bolívar 3–33
- Universidad Jorge Tadeo lozano. Antiguo convento de la merced. Plaza de la merced con calle de la merced
- Villa Myriam. Calle real o calle 25 25-01
- Villa Susana. Calle real o calle 25 19–60

==== Cartagena (tierra bomba) ====
- Hospital San Lázaro. Isla de tierrabomba

=== Mompox ===
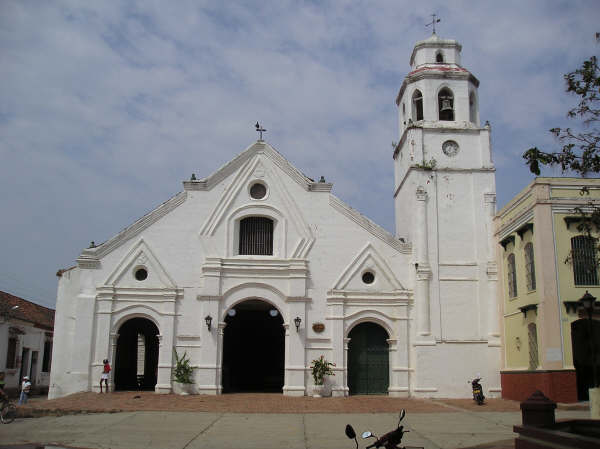
Iglesia de San Francisco en Mompox

- Casa de la cultura y de la academia de historia y su colección de obra mueble. Casa de la familia Germán ribon. Carrera 2 16a-07 16a-15
- Casa de los portales de la marquesa. Conjunto de casas de los portales de la marquesa. Carrera 1 15–51 15–55 15–79 15–83
- Cementerio municipal. Carrera 4 17b-95 carrera 5 17b-23
- Colección de bienes muebles de la fundación para la conservación del patrimonio religioso de mompox. Decreto 2008 5-xi-1996 (declara)
- Colegio Pinillos. Colegio de San Pedro Apóstol. Calle 18a 2a-28
- Edificio del Mercado. Plaza mercado La Concepción y edificio Plaza del Mercado. Plaza Mayor de La Concepción con carrera 1
- Iglesia de San Juan de Dios y su colección de obra mueble. Carrera 2 16–61
- Iglesia de San Francisco y su colección de obra mueble. Carrera 1 20-07 carrera 1 20–23
- Iglesia de San Agustín y su colección de obra mueble. Carrera 2 16–38 calle de San Agustín calle 16a 1–57
- Iglesia de Santa Bárbará y su colección de obra mueble. Plaza de Santa Bárbara carrera 1 13–75, callejón Santa barbará sobre
- Sector antiguo de la ciudad. Sector histórico delimitado. Ley 163 30-xii-1959 (declara). Inscrito en la lista de patrimonio mundial

=== Morales ===
- Templo parroquial de San Sebastián. Ley 503 18-vi-2000 (declara)

=== San Juan Nepomuceno ===
- Santuario de fauna y flora Los Colorados. Resolución 002 del 12-iii-1982 (propone)

=== Simiti ===
- Templo doctrinero de San Antonio de Padua. Capilla doctrinera. Plaza principal esquina nororiental. Decreto 1930 24-ix-1993 (declara)

== Boyacá ==
=== Belén de Cerinza ===
- Capilla doctrinera. Resolución 002 12-iii-1982 (propone)

=== Betéitiva ===
- Capilla doctrinera. Resolución 002 12-iii-1982 (propone)

=== Chiquinquirá ===
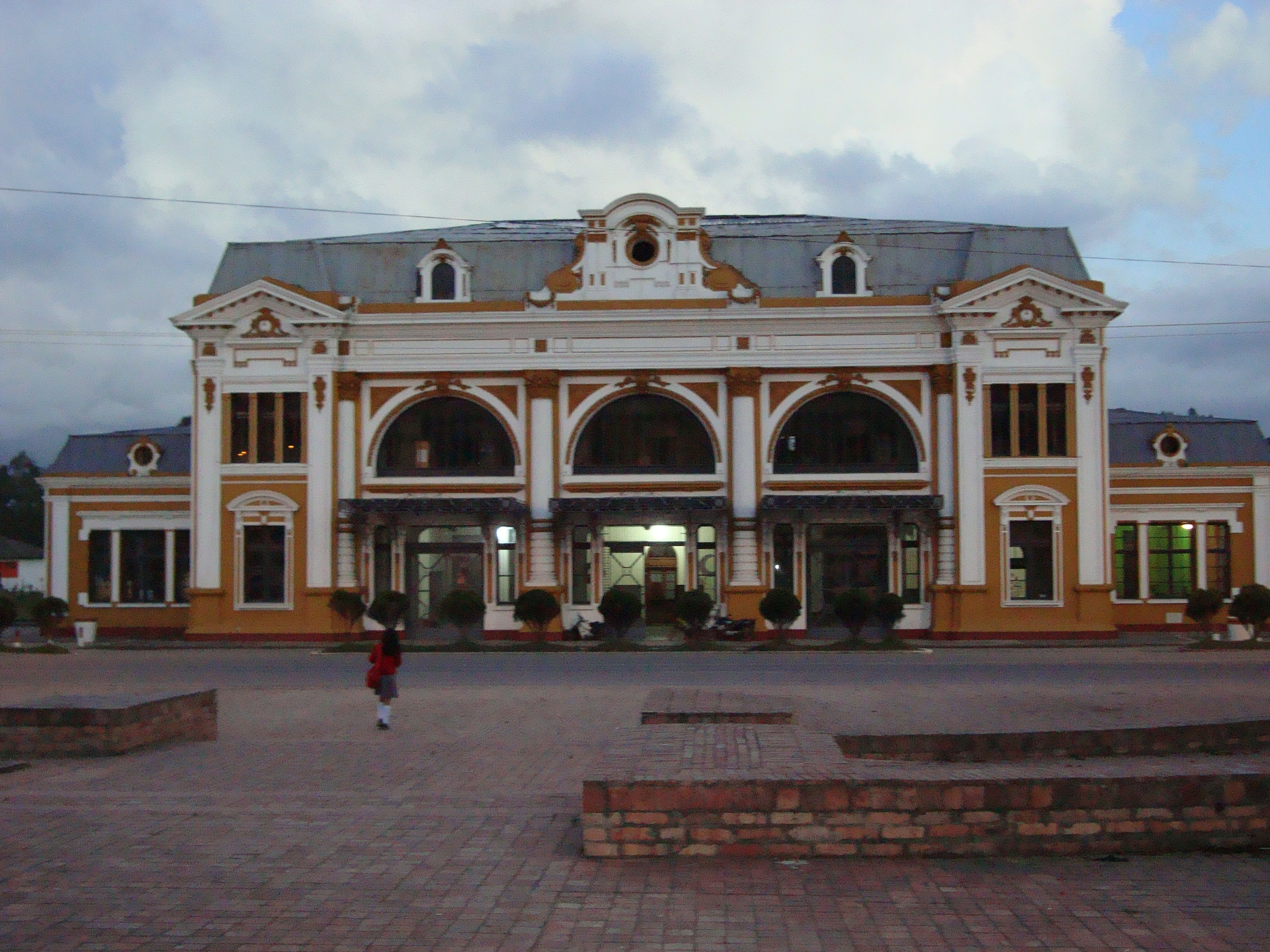
Estación del tren de Chiquinquirá

- Estación de Chiquinquirá. Estación del ferrocarril. Decreto 3053 19-xii-1990 (declara)
- Estación del ferrocarril el fical

=== Chíquiza ===
- Capilla doctrinera de San Isidro de Chiquiza. Resolución 002 12-iii-1982 (propone)

=== Chivatá ===
- Templo parroquial. Resolución 041 31-vii-1990 (propone)

=== Corrales ===
- Casa donde murió el general Juan José Reyes Patria, hero of the Battle of Gámeza

=== Cucaitá ===
- Capilla doctrinera. Templo de indios de Cucaita. Resolución 002 12-iii-1982 (propone)

=== Cuítiva ===
- Capilla doctrinera. Resolución 002 12-iii-1982 (propone)

=== Duitama ===
- Estación del ferrocarril Duitama
- Museo de Arte Religioso. Antigua casa de la hacienda San Rafael. Resolución 004 25-ix-1985 (propone)

==== Duitama (Bonza) ====
- Antigua casa de hacienda. Despensa de Bonza. Despensa del Ejército Nacional. Ruta de la campaña libertadora. Resolución 041 31-vii-1990 (propone)

==== Duitama (Surba y Bonza) ====
- Estación del ferrocarril Bonza

=== Iza ===
- Poblado de Iza. Resolución 0617 11-iv-2002 (declara)

=== Mongua – Socha – Tasco – Jericó – Pisba ===
- Parque nacional natural Pisba. Resolución 002 del 12-iii-1982 (propone)

=== Mongui ===
- Capilla de San Antonio. Decreto 291 24-ii-1975 (declara)
- Centro urbano. Sector histórico sin delimitar. Resolución 002 12-iii-1982 (propone)
- Iglesia y convento. Iglesia y convento franciscano. Basílica. Decreto 291 24-ii-1975 (declara)
- Puente colonial Calicanto. Carrera 3 calle 3. Decreto 291 24-ii-1975 (declara)

=== Motavita ===
- Capilla doctrinera. Resolución 002 12-iii-1982 (propone)

=== Nobsa (Belencito) ===
- Estación del ferrocarril Belencito

=== Oicatá ===
- Capilla doctrinera. Carrera 3 entre calle 4 calle 5. Resolución 002 12-iii-1982 (propone)
- Estación del ferrocarril Oicatá

=== Paipa ===
- Casa de la hacienda El Salitre. Actual hotel. Decreto 290 24-ii-1975 (declara)
- Casa Vargas. Museo Casa Vargas. Casa hacienda Vargas. Resolución 041 31-vii-1990 (propone)
- Casa Varguitas. Hospital de sangre. Ruta de la campana libertadora. Resolución 041 31-vii-1990 (propone)
- Cerro Bolívar. Ruta de la campaña libertadora. Resolución 041 31-vii-1990 (propone)
- Estación del ferrocarril Paipa
- Estación del ferrocarril Soconsuca

=== Paipa (Pantano de Vargas) ===
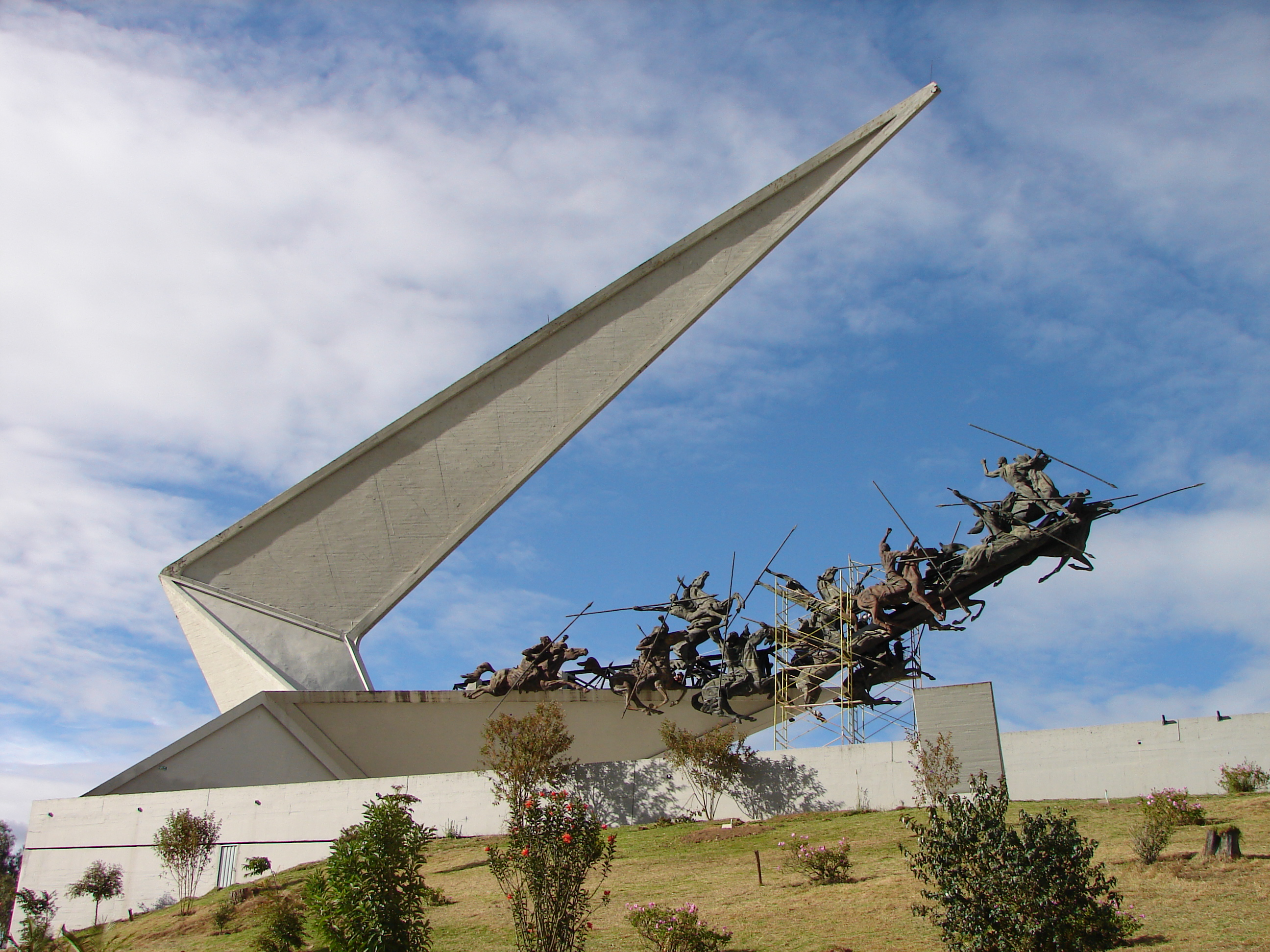
Monumento a los Lanceros del Pantano de Vargas

- Cerro el Cangrejo. Ruta de la campaña libertadora. Decreto 1744 1-ix-1975 (declara)
- Cerro el Picacho. Cerro de la guerra. Ruta de la campaña libertadora. Resolución 041 31-vii-1990 (propone)
- Pantano Vargas – ruta libertadora. Monumento a los Lanceros del Pantano de Vargas, y reserva nacional el terreno alrededor de 1 km del monumento. Decreto 1744 1-ix-1975 (declara)

=== Paya ===
- Trincheron de Paya. Reducto de San Carlos. Fuerte de San Genis. Ruta de la campaña libertadora. Resolución 041 31-vii-1990 (propone)

=== Ráquira (La Candelaria) ===
- Convento del desierto de La Candelaria. Desierto de La Candelaria. Resolución 0789 31-vii-1998 (declara)

=== Saboyá ===
- Estación del ferrocarril Saboyá

==== Saboyá (Garavito) ====
- Estación del ferrocarril Garavito

=== Sáchica ===
- Capilla doctrinera. Iglesia doctrinera

=== Samacá ===
- Estación del ferrocarril Samacá
- Estación del ferrocarril Tierra negra
- Ferrería de Samacá. Vestigios de la antigua ferrería

=== Siachoque ===
- Capilla doctrinera. Resolución 002 12-iii-1982 (propone)

=== Socha (Socha viejo) ===
- Iglesia de Socha viejo. Antigua iglesia. Decreto 268 12-ii-1980 (declara)

=== Sogamoso ===
- Estación del ferrocarril Sogamoso
- Teatro Sogamoso. Calle 12 esquina carrera 9. Decreto 2011 5-xi-1996 (declara)

=== Sora ===
- Capilla doctrinera. Resolución 002 12-iii-1982 (propone)

=== Sotaquirá ===
- Estación del ferrocarril Sotaquirá

=== Sutamarchán ===
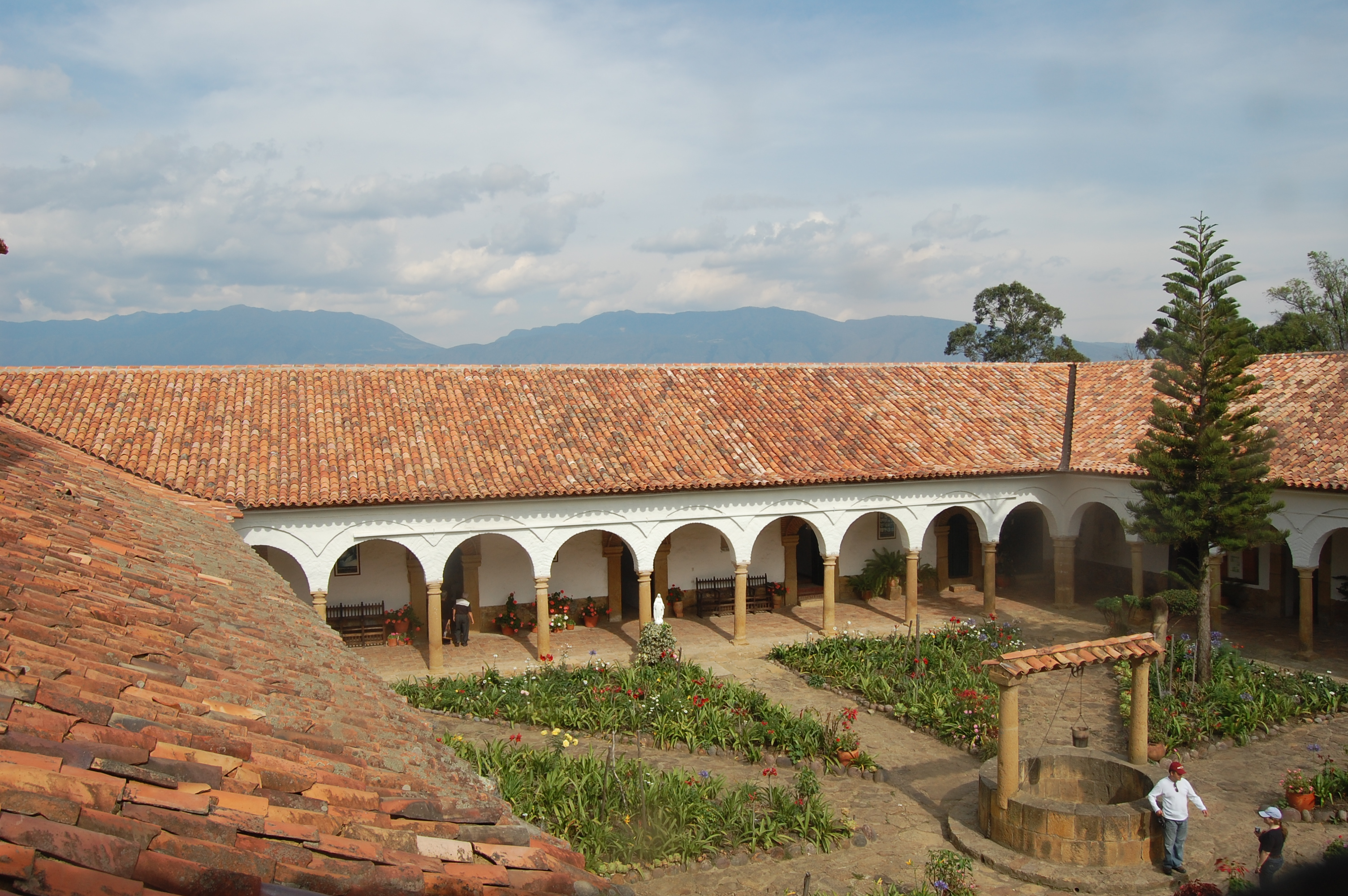
Convento del Santo Ecce Homo

- Convento del Santo Ecce Homo. Vía Villa de Leyva – Santa Sofía. Resolución 0789 31-vii-1998 (declara)

=== Tasco ===
- Antigua casa de hacienda. Aposentos de Tasco. Vereda Santa Bárbara. Resolución 041 31-vii-1990 (propone)

=== Tibasosa ===
- Estación del ferrocarril Tibasosa

=== Tipacoque ===
- Casa colonial de la hacienda Tipacoque. Decreto 390 17-iii-1970 (declara)

=== Toca ===
- Venta de la villana. Ruta de la campana libertadora. Resolución 041 31-vii-1990 (propone)

=== Tópaga ===
- Capilla doctrinera. Resolución 002 12-iii-1982 (propone)
- Iglesia parroquial. Ley 42 18-xi-1965 (declara)
- Pena de topaga. Ruta de la campana libertadora. Cabecera municipal. Resolución 041 31-vii-1990 (propone)
- Puente sobre el río Gameza. Ruta de la campaña libertadora. Resolución 041 31-vii-1990 (propone).

=== Tunja ===
- Alto de San Lázaro. Ruta de la campaña libertadora
- Casa cultural Gustavo Rojas Pinilla. Calle 17 10–63
- Ermita de Chiquinquira. Ermita de San Lázaro. Ruta de la campaña libertadora. Alto de San Lázaro
- Estación de Tunja (antigua)
- Germania railway station
- La Vega railway station
- Páez Nuevo railway station
- Estación del ferrocarril Tunja
- Plaza Real de Tunja. Calle 20 a calle 21 carrera 13 y carrera 14
- Historical centre
- Hunzahúa Well
- Cojines del Zaque

=== Tunja – Arcabuco – Villa de Leyva ===
- Santuario de fauna y flora Iguaque. Resolución 002 del 12-iii-1982 (propone)

==== Tunja (Puente de Boyacá) ====
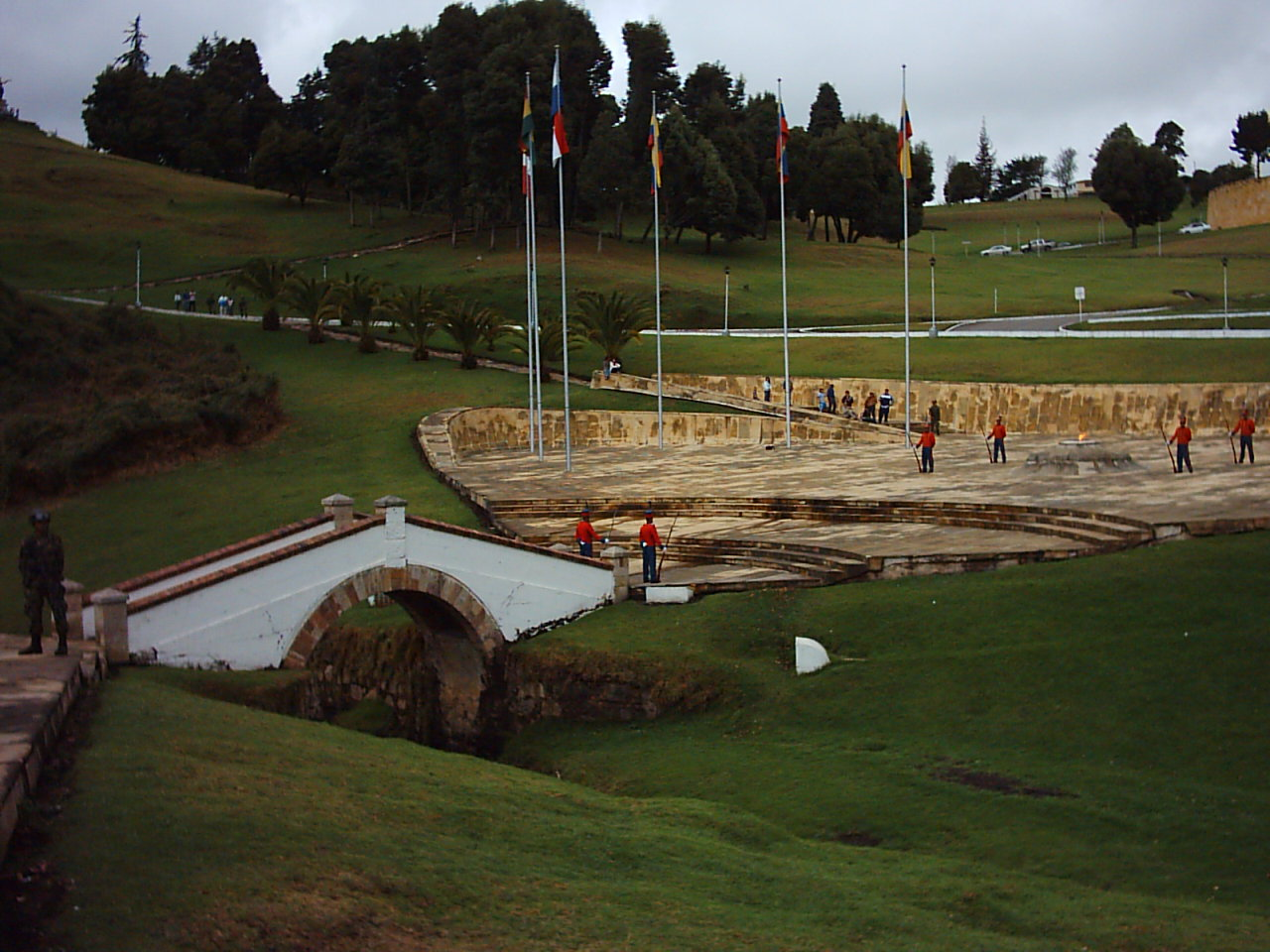
Puente de Boyacá

- Puente de Boyacá

=== Turmequé ===
- Un sector del municipio. Sector histórico delimitado. Decreto 1940 29-viii-1989 (declara)

=== Tuta ===
- Capilla iglesia doctrinera. Resolución 002 12-iii-1982 (propone)
- Estación del ferrocarril Tuta

=== Ventaquemada ===
- Casa de teja o de postas. Resolución 041 31-vii-1990 (propone)
- Casa histórica de ventaquemada. Casa histórica. Casa en ruinas así como los predios adyacentes en donde se alojó el estado mayor libertador en la noche del 7 de agosto de 1819. Ruta de la campaña libertadora. ley 51 26-xii-1967 (declara)
- Estación del ferrocarril Albarracín
- Estación del ferrocarril Páez Viejo
- Estación del ferrocarril Ventaquemada
- Puente de Boyacá. Resolución 041 31-vii-1990 (propone)
- Templo de la libertad. Monumento histórico religioso en el puente de Boyacá (sin construir). Ley 50 del 9-x-1986 (declara)

=== Villa de Leyva ===
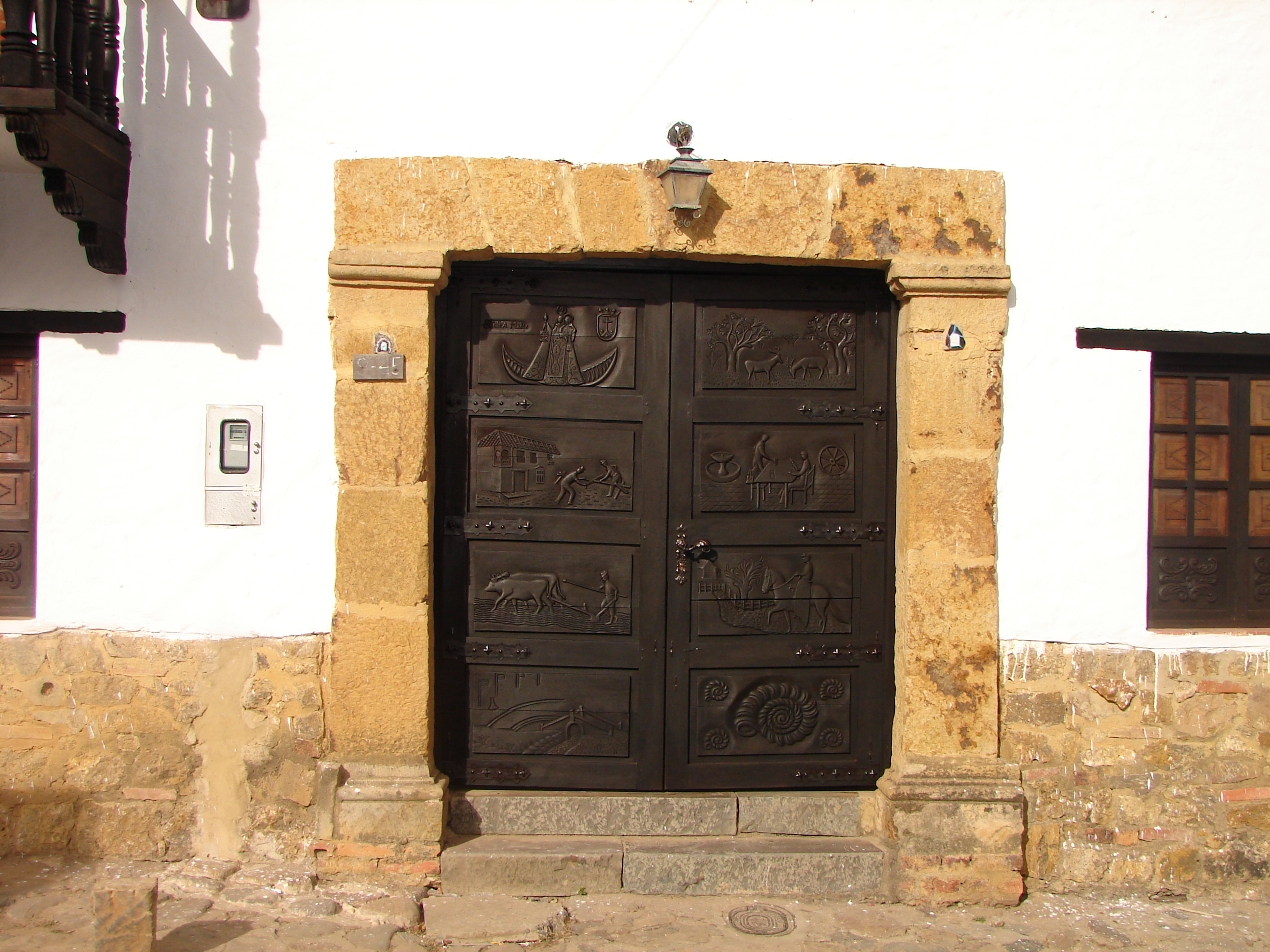
Portón en Villa de Leyva

- Casa donde murió el precursor de la independencia y traductor de los Derechos del hombre, Antonio Nariño. Museo Antonio Nariño. Carrera 9 10–25. Ley 81 26-ix-1961 (declara)
- Sector antiguo de la ciudad. Sector histórico delimitado. Centro histórico. Reglamentación. Decreto 3641 17-xii-1954 (declara)

=== Boyacá – Arauca – Casanare ===
(Chita – El Cocuy – El Espino – Chiscas – Tame – San Lope – Samaca)

- El Cocuy National Natural Park. Resolución 002 del 12-iii-1982 (propone)

== Cauca ==
=== Belalcázar (Avirama) ===
- Chapel Páez. Iglesia Avirama. Resolución 0752 31-vii-1998 (declara)

=== Buenos Aires ===
- Estación del ferrocarril El Hato

==== Buenos Aires (San Francisco) ====
- Estación del ferrocarril San Francisco

=== Cajibío ===
- Estación del ferrocarril Cajibío

=== Caloto ===
- Casa colonial donde se alojó el Libertador. Plaza principal, costado oriental. Ley 18 30-xii-1972 (declara)
- Santuario donde se venera la imagen de la niña María. Parroquia de San Estéban. Plaza principal. Ley 18 30-xii-1972 (declara)

=== Chinas ===
- Chapel Páez

=== Cohetando ===
- Chapel Páez

=== El Tambo ===
- Munchique National Natural Park

=== Inzá (Calderas) ===
- Chapel Páez

=== Inzá (Páez) ===
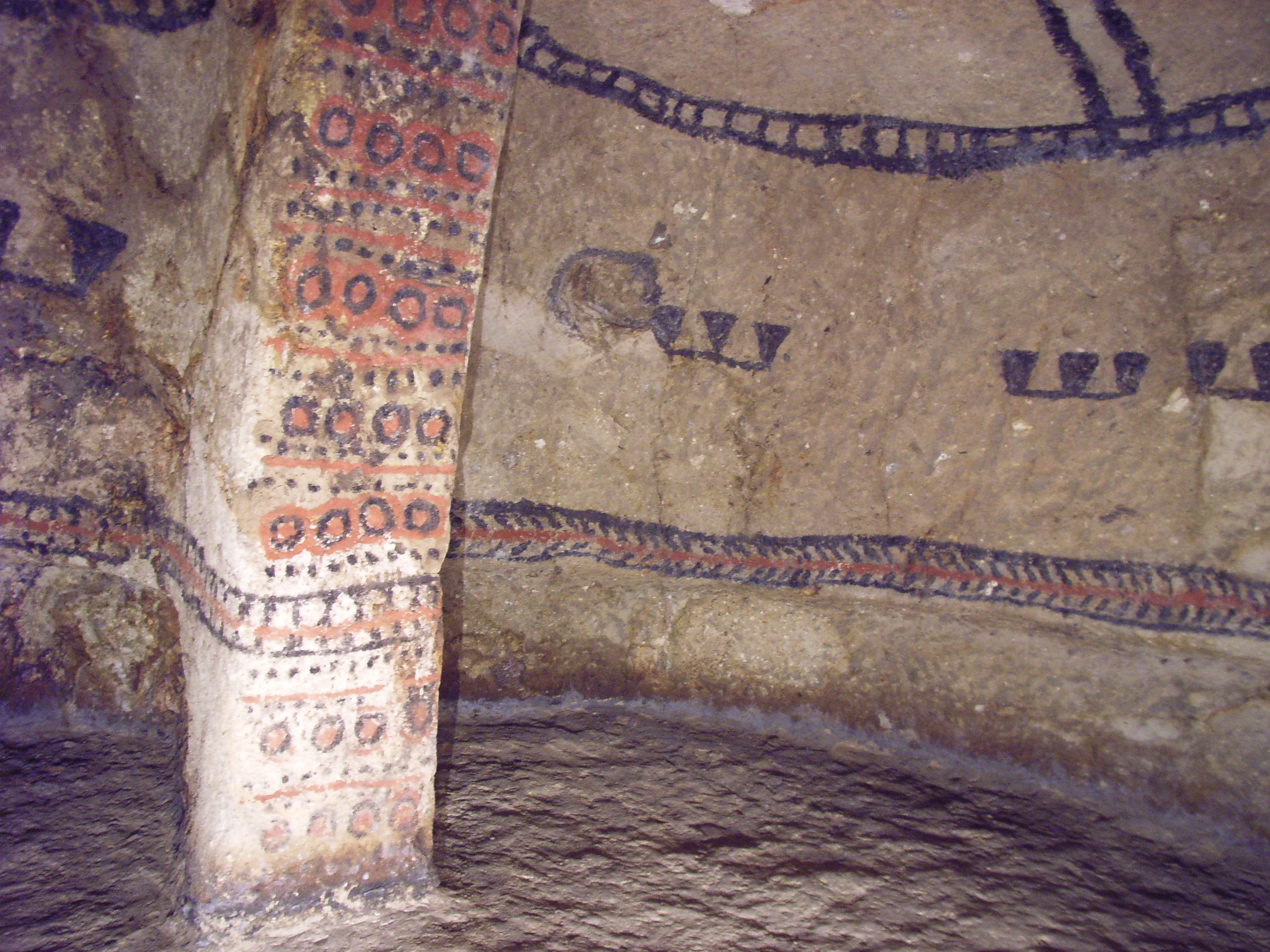
Tumbas de Tierradentro

- Parque Arqueológico de Tierradentro. Sierras de la cordillera Central que llegan hasta el valle de San Agustín. Decreto 774 del 26-iv-1993 (declara). Inscrito en la lista de patrimonio mundial

=== Inzá San Andrés de Pisimbala ===
- Capilla Páez. Capilla doctrinera. Resolución 002 12-iii-1982 (propone)

=== Inzá (Santa Rosa) ===
- Chapel Páez

=== Gorgona Island ===
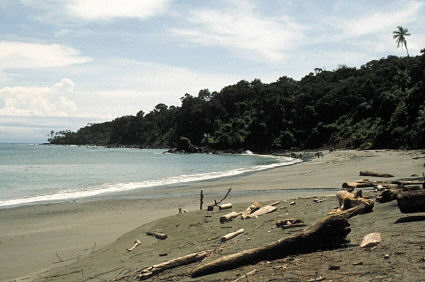
Playa de la Gorgona Island

- Parque Nacional Natural Isla Gorgona

=== Lame ===
- Capilla Páez. Capilla doctrinera de lame

=== Morales ===
- Estación del ferrocarril Morales

==== Morales (Matarredondo) ====
- Estación del ferrocarril matarredondo

=== Páez Belalcázar Suin ===
- Capilla Páez. Iglesia de Suin

=== Piendamó ===
- Piendamo station

==== Piendamó (Corrales) ====
- Estación del ferrocarril corrales

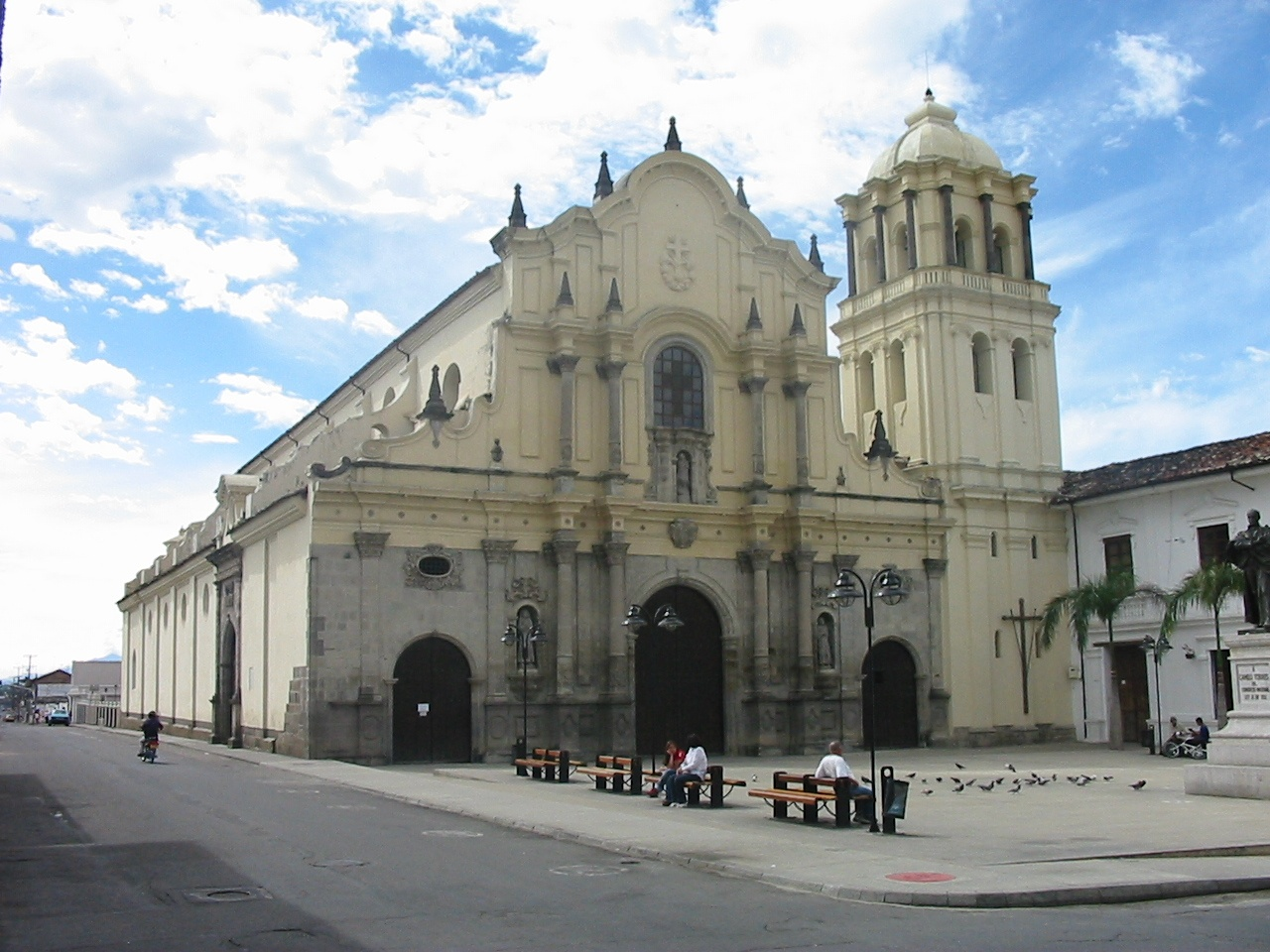
Templo de San Francisco y su plazoleta

=== Popayán ===
- Antiguo claustro del convento de Santo Domingo, sede de la Universidad del Cauca y paraninfo Caldas. Calle 5 4–70 carrera 5 4-08
- Casa caldas. Corporación nacional de turismo del cauca. Museo. Calle 3 4–70
- Casa de la hacienda Coconuco donde vivió y murió Tomás Cipriano de Mosquera. Vereda Coconuco vía Popayán Puracé
- Casa del museo arquidiocesano de arte religioso y su colección de obra mueble. Calle 4 4–56 4–62
- Casa en donde vivió y murió el maestro Guillermo Valencia, junto con el terreno en que está edificada y los lotes contiguos, hasta la calle 2 y la carrera 6. Casa museo Guillermo Valencia. Carrera 6 2–36 2–57
- Casa que fue de Manuel María Mosquera y Arboleda y de su cónyuge. Actual facultad de Humanidades de la Universidad del Cauca. Calle 3 5–38
- Casa Tores Tnorio. Facultad de Humanidades de la universidad
- Casa Agulo. Carrera 6 3–14
- Casas de postgrados y del conservatorio. Casa de Carmen Pino, bisectada a finales del siglo XIX
- Casa rosada. Caja de previsión de la Universidad del Cauca. Calle 4 3–73 3–79
- Claustro de La Encarnación, sede del Colegio Mayor del Cauca. Monasterio de Las Carmelitas. Carrera 5 calle 5 y calle 6
- Claustro del carmen, sede del centro cultural de la universidad del cauca. Antiguo monasterio de las carmelitas. Convento del Carmen. Calle 4 3–56
- Ermita de Jesús Nazareno y su colección de obra mueble. Ermita de Santa Catalina y Santa Bárbara. Calle 5 esq. Carrera 1
- Estación del ferrocarril Puracé
- Hotel Monasterio, antiguo claustro del convento de San Francisco. Calle 4 entre carrera 9 y carrera 10
- Paraninfo Caldas. Calle 5 4–62
- Sector antiguo de la ciudad sector histórico delimitado
- Teatro Guillermo Valencia. Teatro municipal. Calle 3 carrera 7 esquina
- Templo de la Encarnación y colección de obra mueble. Carrera 5 esq. Calle 5
- Templo de San Francisco, su plazoleta y su colección de obra mueble. Calle 4 esq. Carrera 9
- Templo de San José o de la Compañía y su colección de obra mueble. Calle 5 esq. carrera 8
- Templo de Santo Domingo y su colección de obra mueble. Carrera 5 4-08 calle 5 4–70
- Templo del Carmen y su colección de obra mueble. Calle 4 carrera 4 esquina

==== Popayán (Yanaconas) ====
- Iglesia principal. Templo principal. Templo doctrinero de yanaconas. Carrera 6, vía al oriente. Resolución 0789 31-vii-1998 (declara)

=== Santander de Quilichao (Dominguillo) ===
- Capilla de Dominguillo. Capilla de Santa Bárbara. Decreto 2860 26-xi-1984 (declara)
- Casa de hacienda Cuprecia. Decreto 763 25-iv-1996 (declara)
- Casa de hacienda Japio. En las estribaciones de la Cordillera Central. Decreto 763 25-iv-1996 (declara)
- Estación del ferrocarril Santander de Quilichao

=== Suárez ===
- Estación del ferrocarril Suárez

==== Suárez (Gelima La Toma) ====
- Estación del ferrocarril Gelima

=== Talaga ===
- Capilla Páez. Capilla doctrinera. Resolución 002 12-iii-1982 (propone)

=== Togoima ===
- Capilla Páez. Capilla doctrinera. Resolución 002 12-iii-1982 (propone)

=== Cauca – Huila ===
(Popayán – Puracé – San Sebastián – Sotara – La Argentina – La Plata – San José de Isnos – Saladoblanco – San Agustín)

- Parque Nacional Natural Puracé. Resolución 002 del 12-iii-1982 (propone)

=== Cauca – Huila – Tolima. ===
- Nevado del Huila National Natural Park. Resolución 002 del 12-iii-1982 (propone)

== Chocó ==
- Parque nacional natural Ensenada de Utría. Resolución 020 del 17-xi-1992 (propone)

=== Quibdó ===
- Patrimonio arquitectónico. Conjunto de inmuebles de arquitectura republicana. Edificios republicanos. Resolución 0793 31-vii-1998 (declara)

=== Tadó ===
- Iglesia de Tadó. Iglesia San José. Calle 1 carreras 18 a 20. Resolución 0795 31-vii-1998 (declara)

=== Chocó – Antioquia ===
(Riosucio – Turbo)

- Los Katíos National Park – Declared a UNESCO World Heritage Site.

=== Chocó – Risaralda – Valle del Cauca ===
San José del Palmar – Puerto Rico – El Águila

- Parque nacional natural Tatamá, Resolución 020 del 17-xi-1992 (propone)

== Cundinamarca ==
=== Albán ===
- Estación del ferrocarril Albán
- Estación del ferrocarril La Frontera
- Estación del ferrocarril Los Alpes
- Estación del ferrocarril Namay

=== Anapoima ===
- Estación del ferrocarril Anapoima

==== Anapoima y San Antonio ====
- Estación del ferrocarril San Antonio

=== Anolaima ===
- Estación del ferrocarril Petaluma

==== Anolaima y La Florida ====
- Estación del ferrocarril La Florida

=== Apulo ===
- Estación del ferrocarril Apulo

=== Beltrán ===
- Iglesia de Nuestra Señora de la Canoa. Resolución 1794 15-xii-2000 (declara)

=== Bojacá ===
- Casa de la hacienda cortes y su inmediato terreno perimetral. Resolución 007 30-vi-1975 (propone)
- Casa de la hacienda las monjas y su inmediato terreno perimetral. Resolución 007 30-vi-1975 (propone)
- Casa de la hacienda las monjitas y su inmediato terreno perimetral. Antigua casa de la hacienda El Corso. Hoy museo Ángel Montoya. Resolución 007 30-vi-1975 (propone)

=== Cachipay ===
- Estación del ferrocarril Cachipay

=== Cajicá ===
- Casa de la hacienda la fagua cavalier y su inmediato terreno perimetral. actual sede de la pasteurizadora la alqueria. Kilómetro 4 vía a Tabio. Resolución 007 30-vi-1975 (propone)
- Estación del ferrocarril Cajicá. Calle 2 parque la estación

=== Caparrapí ===
- Estación del ferrocarril Cambras

==== Caparrapí y Córdoba ====
- Estación del ferrocarril Córdoba

==== Caparrapí y El Dindal ====
- Estación del ferrocarril El Dindal

=== Chía ===
- Casa de la hacienda Fusca y su inmediato terreno perimetral. Resolución 007 30-vi-1975 (propone)
- Casa de la hacienda El Puente y su inmediato terreno perimetral. Resolución 007 30-vi-1975 (propone)
- Estación del ferrocarril La Caro
- Hacienda Yerbabuena. Actual sede del Instituto Caro y Cuervo. Carretera central del norte, kilómetro 24. Decreto 505 13-ii-1986 (declara)
- Puente del común. Autopista Norte cruce carretera Chía-Zipaquirá. Decreto 1584 11-viii-1975 (declara)

=== Chocontá ===
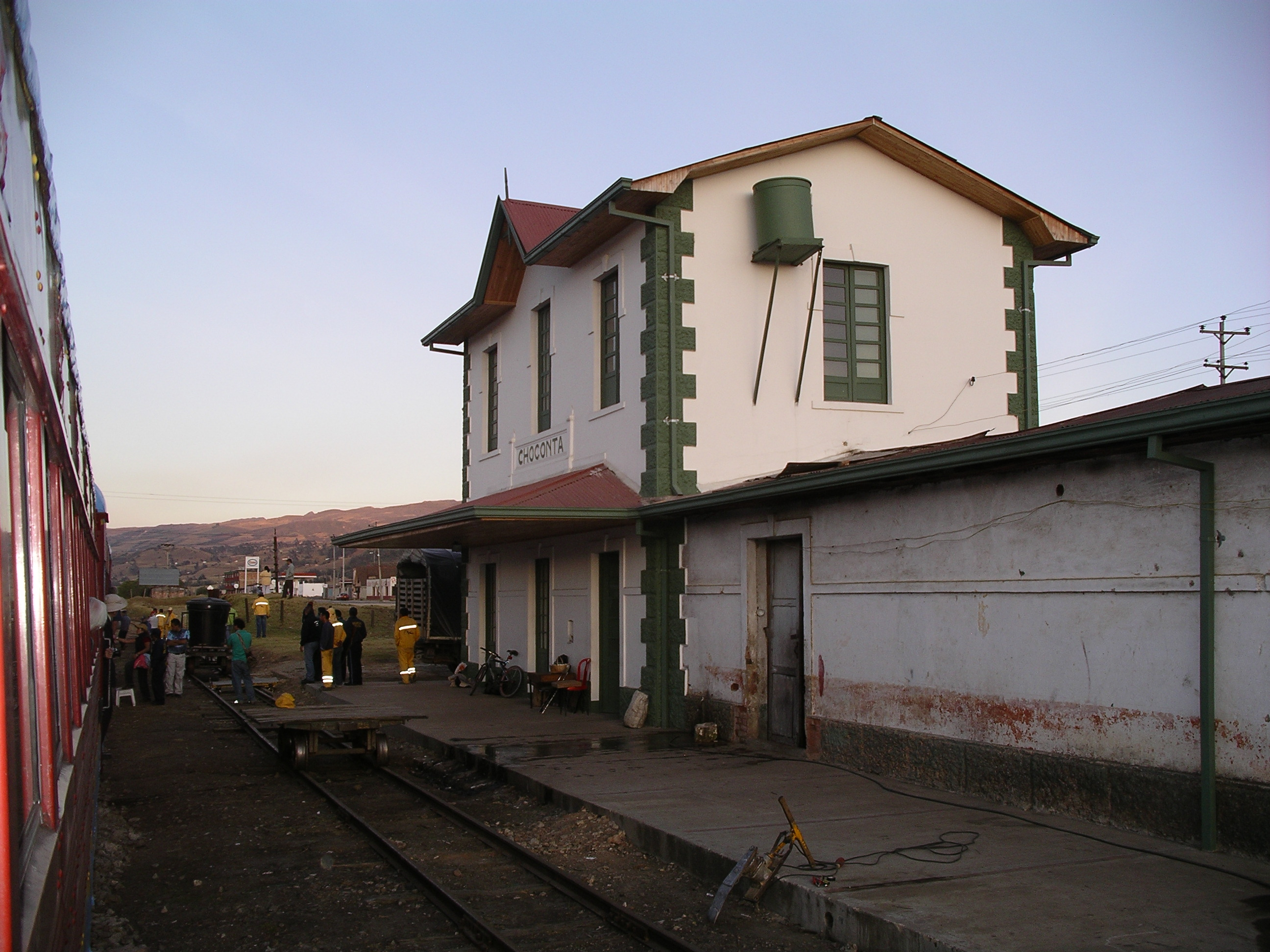
Estación de Chocontá

- Estación de Chocontá. Estación del ferrocarril. Carrera 8 calle 11. Decreto 746 24-iv-1996 (declara)

=== Cota ===
- Casa de la hacienda el noviciado y su inmediato terreno perimetral. Actual sede social de la Universidad de los Andes. Resolución 007 30-vi-1975 (propone)

=== Facatativá ===
- Casa de la hacienda moyano y su inmediato terreno perimetral. Resolución 007 30-vi-1975 (propone)
- Casa de la hacienda San marino y su inmediato terreno perimetral. Resolución 007 30-vi-1975 (propone)
- Estación del ferrocarril Cisneros
- Estación del ferrocarril El Corzo
- Estación del ferrocarril El Cruce
- Estación del ferrocarril Facatativá
- Estación del ferrocarril Manzano
- Hospital San Rafael. Carrera 2 1–80. Decreto 1931 24-ix-1993 (declara)

=== Facatativá – Zipacon – Anolaima – Cachipay – La Mesa – Anapoima – Apulo – Tocaima – Girardot ===
- Corredor férreo Facatativá-Girardot. Resolución 0800 31-vii-1998 (declara)

=== Funza ===
- Casa de hacienda la pesquera y su inmediato terreno perimetral. Resolución 007 30-vi-1975 (propone)
- Casa de la hacienda catama y su inmediato terreno perimetral. Resolución 007 30-vi-1975 (propone)
- Casa de la hacienda hato de la ramada y su inmediato terreno perimetral. Resolución 007 30-vi-1975 (propone)
- Estación del ferrocarril Funza
- Estación del ferrocarril La Floresta

=== Fúquene ===
- Estación del ferrocarril Fúquene
- Estación del ferrocarril Guatancuy
- Estación del ferrocarril Puerto Robles

=== Fusagasugá ===
- Quinta Coburgo. Decreto 602 26-iii-1996 (declara)

=== Gachancipá ===
- Estación de Gachancipá. Estación del ferrocarril. Decreto 746 24-iv-1996 (declara)
- Estación del ferrocarril Rabanal

=== Girardot ===
- Estación del ferrocarril Girardot
- Estación del ferrocarril Yesal
- Plaza de mercado. Carrera 9 carrera 10 calle 10 calle 11. Decreto 1932 24-ix-1993 (declara)

=== Guachetá ===
- Estación del ferrocarril Guachetá

=== Guaduas ===
- Sector antiguo de la ciudad. sector histórico sin delimitar. Ley 163 30-xii-1959 (declara)

==== Guaduas y Guaduero ====
- Estación del ferrocarril guaduero

=== Guasca ===
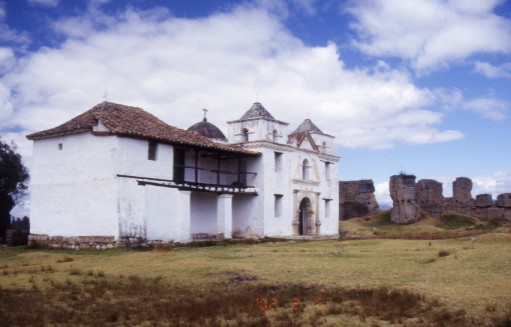
Capilla de Siecha en Guasca

- Capilla de Siecha. Decreto 604 4-iii-1991 (declara)
- Casa de la hacienda de Siecha y su inmediato terreno perimetral. Resolución 007 30-vi-1975 (propone)

=== La Calera ===
- Capilla interior de la actual Casa de Gobierno. Decreto 2857 26-xi-1984 (declara)

=== La Mesa ===
- Estación del ferrocarril Doima
- Estación del ferrocarril El Hospicio
- Estación del ferrocarril La Mesa
- Estación del ferrocarril La Salada
- Estación del ferrocarril Pesquera

=== La Mesa (La Esperanza) ===
- Estación del ferrocarril La Esperanza

=== La Mesa (San Javier) ===
- Estación del ferrocarril Margaritas

=== La Mesa (San Joaquín) ===
- Estación del ferrocarril San Joaquín

=== Lenguazaque ===
- Estación del ferrocarril El Rhur
- Estación del ferrocarril Lenguazaque

=== Madrid ===
- Casa de la hacienda Casablanca Vergara y su inmediato terreno perimetral. Parte oriental de Madrid (cerros). Resolución 007 30-vi-1975 (propone)
- Casa de la hacienda El Colegio y su inmediato terreno perimetral. Resolución 007 30-vi-1975 (propone)
- Casa de la hacienda El Molino y su inmediato terreno perimetral. Resolución 007 30-vi-1975 (propone)
- Casa de la hacienda La Jabonera cuervo y su inmediato terreno perimetral. Resolución 007 30-vi-1975 (propone)
- Estación del ferrocarril Madrid

=== Mosquera ===
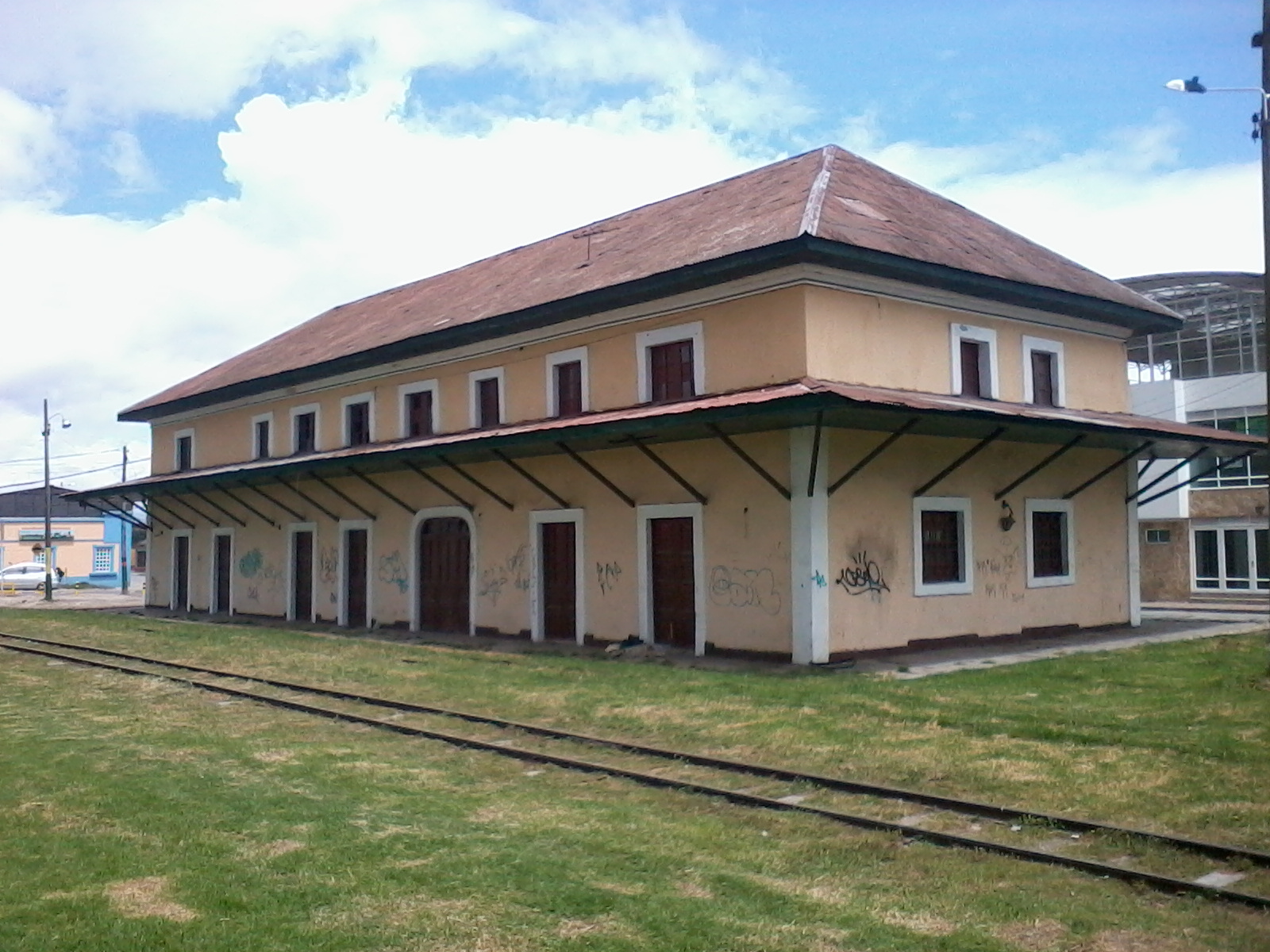
Estación del ferrocarril en Mosquera

- Casa de la hacienda San Jorge y su inmediato terreno perimetral. Carretera a la mesa. Resolución 007 30-vi-1975 (propone)
- Estación del ferrocarril Mosquera

=== Nemocón ===
- Casa de la hacienda Casablanca Nieto y su inmediato terreno perimetral. Resolución 007 30-vi-1975 (propone)
- Estación del ferrocarril Nemocón

=== Nimaima (Tobia) ===
- Estación del ferrocarril Tobia

=== Pacho ===
- Ferrería de Pacho. Vestigios de la antigua ferrería

=== Puerto Salgar ===
- Estación del ferrocarril Brisas

=== Puerto Salgar (Colorados) ===
- Estación del ferrocarril Colorados
- Estación del ferrocarril México
- Estación del ferrocarril Puerto Salgar

=== Ricaurte ===
- Antigua hacienda Peñalisa – casa y capilla. Resolución 1797 15-xii-2000 (declara)

=== San Juan de Río Seco (Cambao) ===
- Estación del ferrocarril Cambao

=== Sasaima ===
- Estación del ferrocarril Sasaima

==== Sasaima (La Victoria) ====
- Estación del ferrocarril La Victoria

=== Sesquilé ===
- Casa de la hacienda Chaleche y su inmediato terreno perimetral, Resolución 007 30-vi-1975 (propone)
- Estación del ferrocarril Sesquilé – Vereda Boitiva

=== Sibaté ===
- Casa de la hacienda San Benito y su inmediato terreno perimetral. Resolución 007 30-vi-1975 (propone)

=== Silvania ===
- Parque arqueológico. Dentro de la hacienda Tequendama. Resolución 001-1971 (propone)

=== Simijaca ===
- Casa de la hacienda aposentos y su inmediato terreno perimetral. Resolución 007 30-vi-1975 (propone)
- Estación del ferrocarril Simijaca

=== Soacha ===
- Casa de hacienda Tequendama y su inmediato terreno perimetral
- Casa de la hacienda Terreros y su inmediato terreno perimetral
- Casa de la hacienda Cincha y su inmediato terreno perimetral
- Casa de la hacienda El Vínculo y su inmediato terreno perimetral
- Casa de la hacienda Fute y su inmediato terreno perimetral
- Alicachin station
- Chusaca station
- Soacha station
- Oratorio de la hacienda Canoas Gómez y su inmediato terreno perimetral
- Charquito station

=== Sopó ===
- Casa de la hacienda Hato Grande y su inmediato terreno perimetral. Vía Sopó kilómetro 35, Resolución 007 30-vi-1975 (propone)
- Casa de la hacienda Casablanca Ortiz y su inmediato terreno perimetral. Resolución 007 30-vi-1975 (propone)
- Casa de la hacienda el castillo, hoy herradura y su inmediato terreno perimetral. Resolución 007 30-vi-1975 (propone)
- Conjunto arquitectónico de la iglesia del divino salvador y su casa cural, incluida la colección denominada "los ángeles de sopo". Decreto 3054 19-xii-1990 (declara)

==== Sopó (Briceño) ====
- Estación del ferrocarril Briceño

=== Subachoque ===
- Casa de la hacienda Pradera y su inmediato terreno perimetral. Resolución 007 30-vi-1975 (propone)
- Hornos y torres de la ferrería de la pradera

=== Suesca ===
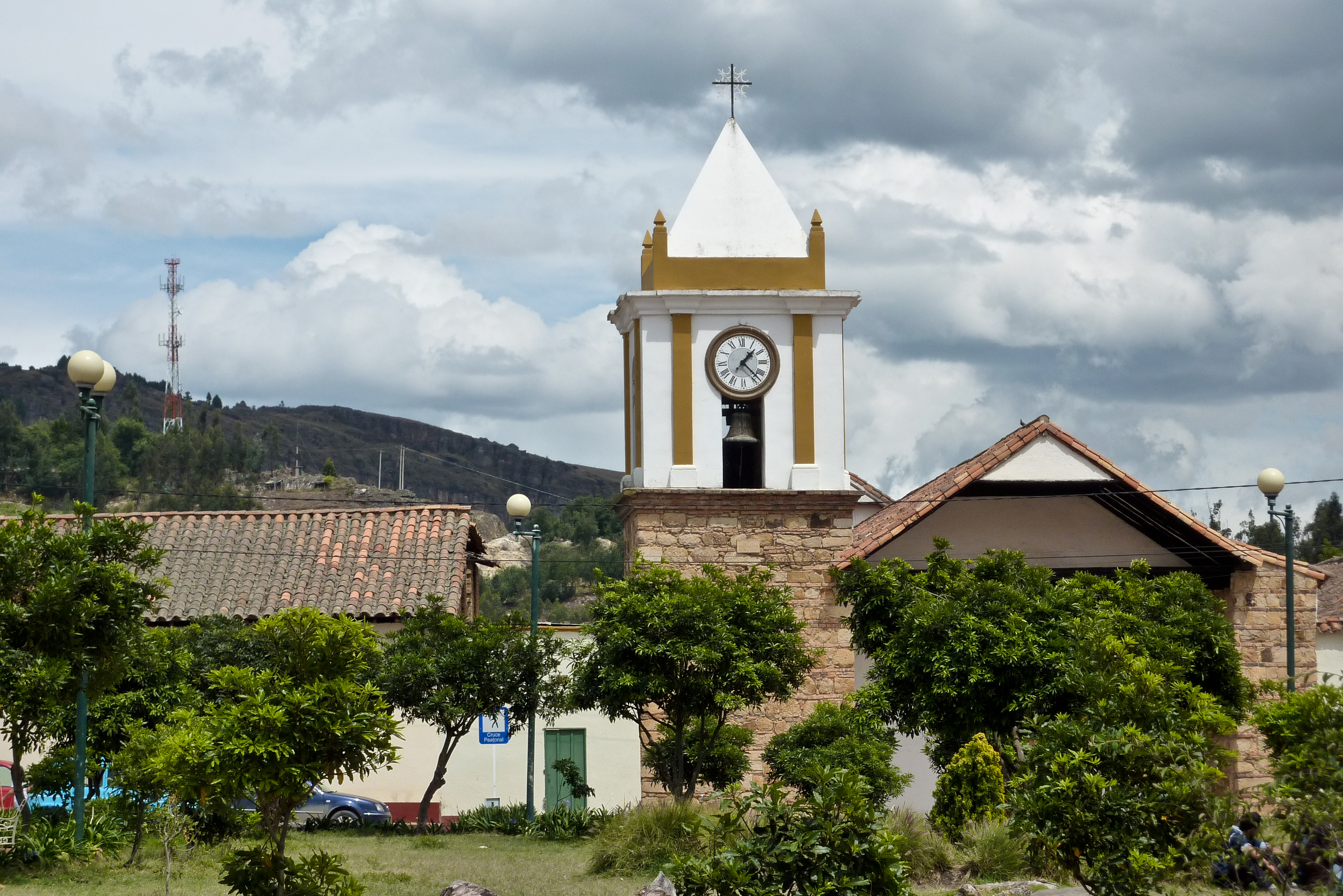
Capilla doctrinera en Suesca

- Chapel doctrinera y plaza principal
- El Crucero station
- La Laguna station
- Mogua station
- Suesca station

=== Susa ===
- Susa station

=== Sutatausa ===
- Iglesia colonial, plaza y capillas Posas. Decreto 192 31-i-1980 (declara)

=== Tabio ===
- Capilla doctrinera. Ermita de Santa Bárbara. Carretera a banos termales. Resolución 002 12-iii-1982 (propone)

=== Tena ===
- Hacienda de Tena y su conjunto: casa de huéspedes, biblioteca, casa principal, administración, capilla y casa comercial. Entrada principal al pueblo en la vereda El Rosario. Resolución 001a-1971 (propone)

=== Tenjo ===
- Capilla doctrinera. templo doctrinero neogranadino. Plaza principal
- Casa de hacienda los laureles y su inmediato terreno perimetral
- Casa de la hacienda el cacique y su inmediato terreno perimetral
- Casa de la hacienda granada y su inmediato terreno perimetral
- Casa de la hacienda poveda y su inmediato terreno perimetral
- Plaza principal del municipio. Los predios y sus construcciones, las 4 esquinas que conforman la plaza y la capilla ubicada en la esq. nororiental de la manzana catastral 012, calle 4 carrera 2. Se exceptúan los inmuebles con intervenciones modernas

=== Tocaima ===
- Estación de Portillo
- Estación del ferrocarril Portillo
- Estación del ferrocarril Salado
- Estación del ferrocarril Tocaima

=== Tocancipá ===
- Estación de Tocancipá. Estación del ferrocarril. Decreto 746 24-iv-1996 (declara)

=== Útica ===
- Estación del ferrocarril Útica

=== Villapinzón ===
- Estación del ferrocarril La Nevera
- Estación del ferrocarril Villapinzón

=== Villeta ===
- Bagazal station
- La Margarita station
- Mave station
- San Miguel station
- Villeta station

=== Zipacón ===
- Sebastopol station
- Tablanca station
- Zipacón station

==== Zipacón (El Ocaso) ====
- Estación del ferrocarril El Ocaso

==== Zipacon (la capilla) ====
- Estación del ferrocarril La Capilla

=== Zipaquirá ===
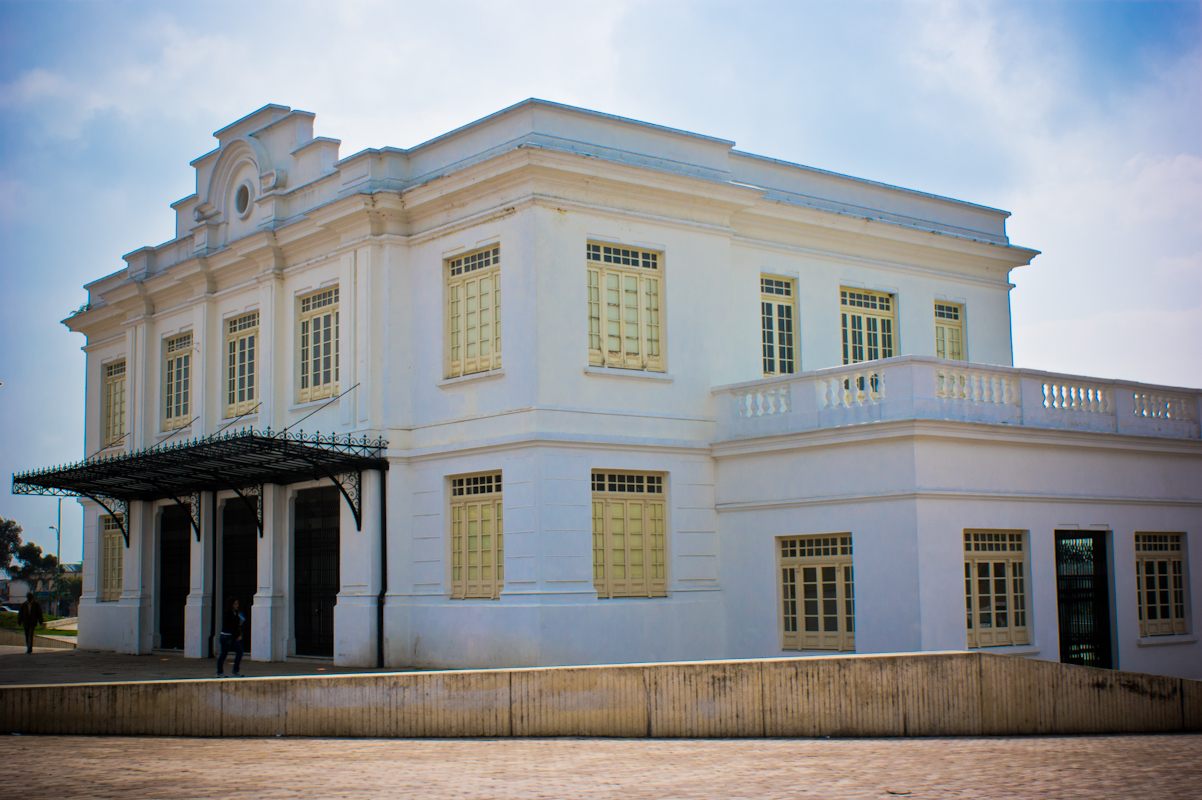
Estación del ferrocarril en Zipaquirá

- Urban sector. Sector histórico delimitado
- Betania station
- Mortino station
- Zipaquirá station

==== Zipaquirá – Barandillas – Las Fuentes – El Tunal ====
- Zona localizada en el municipio de Zipaquirá valle del abra veredas de barandillas, las fuentes y el tunal. Resolución 004 del 10-x-1972 (propone)

=== Cundinamarca – Meta ===
(Fómeque – Quetame – La Calera – Guasca – Junín – Gachalá – El Calvario – Restrepo)

- Chingaza National Natural Park

== Guainia ==
- Reserva Natural Puinawai

=== San Felipe ===
- Fuerte de San Felipe de Rionegro o de San Carlos

== Guaviare ==
- Reserva nacional natural Nukak

== Huila ==
=== Acevedo ===
- Parque nacional natural Cueva de los Guácharos. Vertiente occidental de la cordillera Oriental sur este del Huila. Resolución 020 del 17-xi-1992 (propone)

=== Acevedo – Isnos – La Argentina – La Plata – Porapa – Pitalito – Saladoblanco – San Agustín – Tarqui – Timaná ===
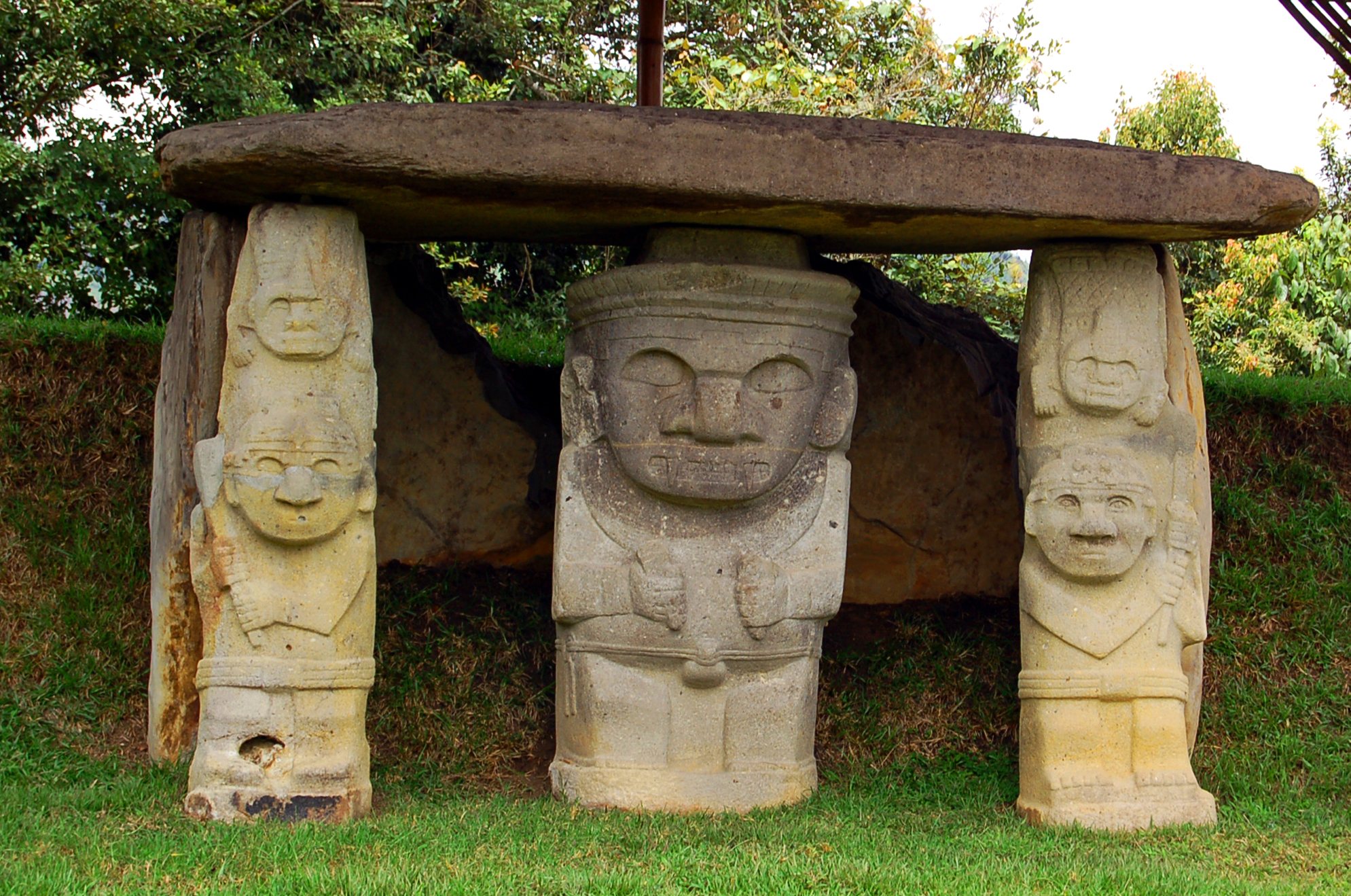
San Agustín Archaeological Park

- San Agustín Archaeological Park. Sierras de la cordillera Central que llegan hasta el valle de San Agustín en el alto Magdalena. Decreto 774 del 26-iv-1993 (declara); a World Heritage Site

=== Gigante ===
- Casa donde nació Ismael Perdomo. Hostal. Calle 3 4–45. Decreto 222 21-ii-1972 (declara)
- Iglesia de San Antonio. Templo donde fue bautizado monseñor Ismael Perdomo. Decreto 222 21-ii-1972 (declara)

=== Neiva ===
- Capilla de la concepción. Iglesia de la concepción. Resolución 002 12-iii-1982 (propone)
- Estación del ferrocarril Neiva

==== Neiva (Fortalecillas) ====
- Estación del ferrocarril Fortalecillas

=== Villavieja ===
- Capilla Santa Bárbara. Plaza principal, costado sur. Resolución 002 06-iv-1981 (propone)
- Estación del ferrocarril Villavieja

==== Villavieja (Golondrinas) ====
- Estación del ferrocarril Golondrinas

==== Villavieja (Potosí) ====
- Estación del ferrocarril Potosí

=== Yaguara ===
- Casa donde nació y vivió Adriano Perdomo Trujillo fundador de la Cruz Roja. Plaza principal, esquina nororiental. Ley 4 9-i-1986 (declara)

== La Guajira ==
- Santuario de fauna y flora Los Flamencos. Resolución 002 del 12-iii-1982 (propone)

=== El Molino ===
- Ermita de San Lucas. Iglesia colonial del molino. Resolución 008 12-xi-1992 (propone)

=== Riohacha ===
- Tumba de José Prudencio Padilla. Catedral de Nuestra Señora de los Remedios. Calle 2 entre carrera 7 carrera 8. ley 6 20-viii-1948 (declara)

=== Uribia ===
- Parque nacional natural Macuira. Resolución 002 del 12-iii-1982 (propone)

=== La Guajira – Magdalena – Cesar ===
- Parque nacional natural Sierra Nevada de Santa Marta – Decreto 1192 del 26-v-1977 (declara)

== Magdalena ==
=== Aracataca ===
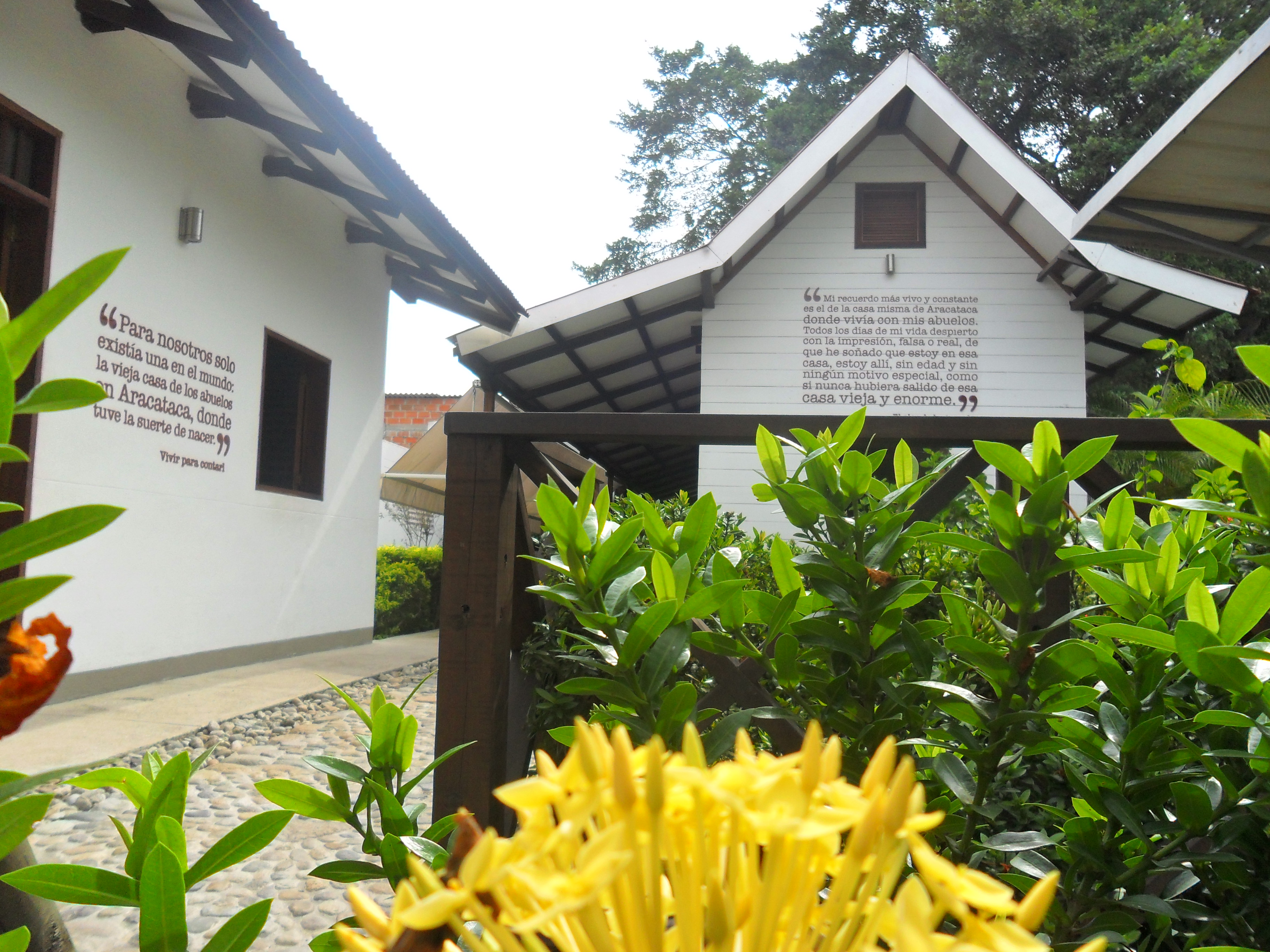
House of birth of Gabriel García Márquez in Aracataca

- Casa natal del escritor Gabriel García Márquez y el ámbito cultural de la población. Decreto 480 13-iii-1996 (declara)
- Estación del ferrocarril Aracataca

=== Ciénaga ===
- Centro histórico. Sector histórico delimitado. Partiendo del cruce de la calle 5 con la carrera 17 y sobre ella en dirección sur hasta encontrar la carrera 16 y sobre ella en dirección sur hasta el cruce con la calle 14, sobre ella en dirección occidente hasta encontrar el cruce con la carrera 10, sobre ella en dirección norte hasta encontrar el cruce con la calle 5 y sobre ella, en dirección oriente hasta encontrar el punto de origen
- Neerlandia railway station
- Ciénaga railway station
- Papares railway station

==== Ciénaga (Guamachito) ====
- Estación del ferrocarril Guamachito

==== Ciénaga (Orihueca) ====
- Estación del ferrocarril Oricueta

==== Ciénaga (Riofrío) ====
- Estación del ferrocarril Riofrio

==== Ciénaga (Sevilla) ====
- Estación del ferrocarril Sevilla

=== Fundación ===
- Estación del ferrocarril Algarrobo
- Estación del ferrocarril Fundación
- Estación del ferrocarril Lleras

=== Santa Marta ===
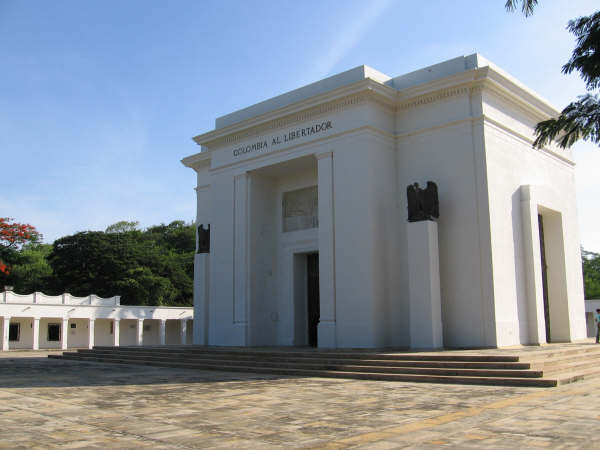
Quinta de San Pedro Alejandrino, hacienda where Simón Bolívar died

- Antiguo hospital San Juan de Dios. Carrera 1c y calle 22
- Casa de la Aduana
- Claustro de San Juan Nepomuceno. Antiguo claustro del seminario. Carrera 2 16–44
- Edificio sede del Instituto Técnico Industrial. Escuela industrial. Avenida El Libertador calle 14 11–38
- Edificio sede del Liceo Celedón, con su correspondiente casa del rector. Avenida El Libertador o calle 14 12-08.
- Estación del ferrocarril Pozos Colorados
- Fuerte de San Fernando
- Fuerte El Morro. Isla El Morro
- Quinta de San Pedro Alejandrino. Antigua casa de hacienda
- Santuario de fauna y flora ciénaga grande de Santa Marta
- Sector antiguo de la ciudad. Sector histórico delimitado. Reglamentación

==== Santa Marta (Bonda) ====
- Estación del ferrocarril Bonda

==== Santa Marta (Buritaca) ====
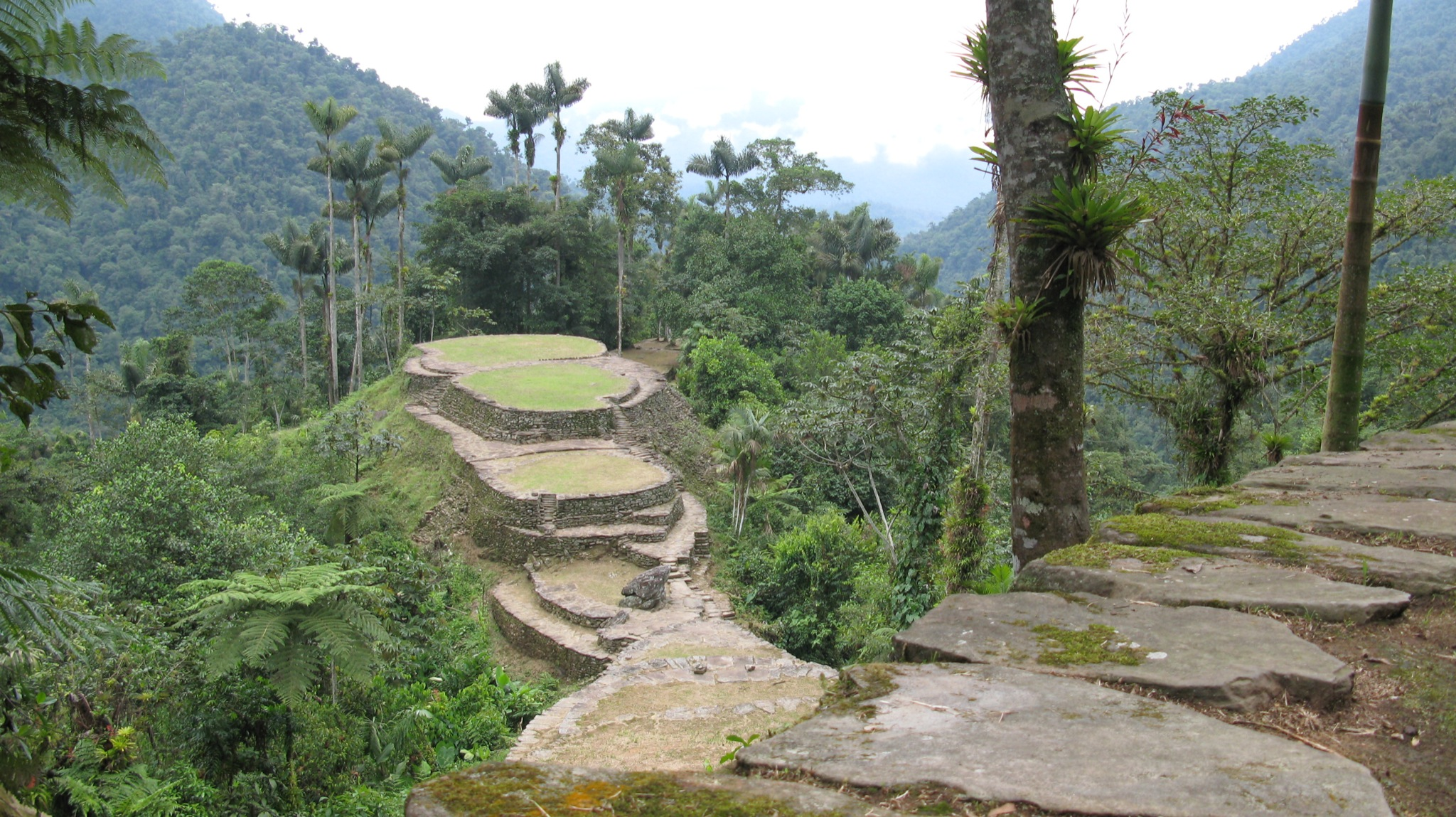
Ciudad Perdida en la zona norte de la Sierra Nevada de Santa Marta

- Parque arqueológico de Teyuna – Ciudad Perdida. Parque arqueológico de ciudad perdida. Sierra Nevada de Santa Marta. Resolución 037 del 31-x-1995 (propone)
- Tayrona National Natural Park. Resolución 002 del 12-iii-1982 (propone)

==== Santa Marta (Gaira) ====
- Estación del ferrocarril Gaira

==== Santa Marta (Mamatoco) ====
- Capilla de San Jerónimo. Iglesia de Mamatoco. Plaza principal de Mamatoco, costado oriental. Plaza de San Aragón. Resolución 015 13-xi-1992 (propone)

==== Santa Marta (Taganga) ====
- Iglesia de San Francisco de Asís. Church of Taganga. Plaza de San Francisco. Carrera 2a entre calle 8 y calle 9. Decreto 481 13-iii-1996 (declara)

=== Sitio Nuevo ===
- Parque nacional natural isla de salamanca. Resolución 002 del 12-iii-1982 (propone)

=== Tenerife ===
- Templo parroquial de San Sebastián de Tenerife y su colección de bienes muebles. Plaza principal. Decreto 1912 2-xi-1995 (declara)

== Meta ==
- Parque nacional natural Tinigua. Resolución 020 del 17-xi-1992 (propone)

=== San Juan de Arama ===
- Parque nacional natural Sierra de la Macarena. Ley 163 del 30-xii-1959 art.5 (declara)

=== Meta – Caquetá ===
(San Juan de Arama – Guacamayas – San Vicente del Caguán)

- Parque nacional natural Cordillera de los Picachos. Resolución 002 del 12-iii-1982 (propone)

== Nariño ==
=== Arboleda ===
- Reserva arqueológica de Berruecos (toda la región). Por el este limita con San José en una extensión de 10.255 km; norte: municipio de la unión en una extensión de 3.605 km; oeste: municipio de San Lorenzo en una extensión de 8.249 km sur: río Juanambu en una extensión de 8.575 km. Área total 139 km². Decreto 2666 del 31-xii-1971 (declara)

=== Consaca (Bombona) ===
- Hacienda bombona. Resolución 002 12-iii-1982 (propone)

=== Ipiales (Las Lajas) ===
- Santuario nacional de Las Lajas. Iglesia de Las Lajas

=== Mosquera – El Charco – Olaya Herrera ===
- Parque nacional natural Sanquianga. Bahía Sanquianga en el litoral pacífico

=== Pasto ===
- Capilla de La Milagrosa y todo el conjunto arquitectónico del cual hace parte. Actual instituto pedagógico. Antiguo hospital de San Pedro. Carrera 26 22-225
- Carnavales de Pasto
- Casona donde funciona la institución denominada Museo Taminango monasco dachis. Casa taminango. Museo taminango. Calle 13 27–71
- Catedral. Calle 27, carrera 26 esquina
- Edificio de la Gobernación. Palacio de Gobierno. Calle 19, carrera 24 esquina
- Santuario de fauna y flora Isla de La Corota
- Santuario de fauna y flora Galeras. En la cordillera de los Andes, en el Nudo de los Pastos
- Sector antiguo de la ciudad. Sector histórico delimitado
- Teatro Imperial. Carrera 26 14–59
- Pasto (Corregimiento El Encanto)
- Capilla misionera

=== Pupiales ===
- Reserva arqueológica Pupiales (toda la región incluyendo sus corregimientos, caseríos e inspecciones de policía)

=== San Andrés ===
- Capilla misionera

=== San Francisco ===
- Capilla misionera

=== Sandona ===
- Iglesia. Basílica de Nuestra Señora del Rosario. Plaza principal esquina

== Norte de Santander ==
- Área natural única Los Estoraques. Resolución 002 del 12-iii-1982 (propone)
- Parque nacional natural Catatumbo Bari. Río Catatumbo. Resolución 020 del 17-xi-1992 (propone)

=== Bochalema ===
- Estación del ferrocarril Bochalema. Escuela Penaviva. km 37 vía Bochalema
- Estación del ferrocarril Diamante

==== Bochalema (la donjuana) ====
- Estación del ferrocarril la donjuana. Campamento ministerio de obras públicas

=== Chitaga ===
- Puente Real

=== Cúcuta ===
- Antigua plaza de mercado cubierto (demolida). Actual edificio San José. Empresas públicas municipales. Avenida 6 calle 11 esquina sur occidental. Resolución 002 del 12-iii-1982 (propone)
- Casa de la cultura. Torre del reloj. Antiguo edificio de la energía eléctrica. Calle 13 entre avenida 3 y avenida 4 costado oriental. Resolución 002 12-iii-1982 (propone)
- Edificio de la gobernación del norte de Santander. Palacio de Gobierno. Avenida 5 calle 14. Resolución 024 14-v-1990 (propone)
- Estación del ferrocarril Santa María
- Estación del ferrocarril Moros
- Estación del ferrocarril Carrillo
- Estación del ferrocarril Aguaclara
- Estación del ferrocarril Alonsito
- Estación del ferrocarril Patillales. km 37 vía puerto Santander
- Estación del ferrocarril Guayabal. Corregimiento de Guayabal
- Estación del ferrocarril Agua Blanca. Corregimiento de Aguablanca
- Estación del ferrocarril Oripaya. Corregimiento de Pripaya
- Estación del ferrocarril km 52
- Estación del ferrocarril Edén
- Estación del ferrocarril La Esperanza. escuela
- Estación del ferrocarril La Tigre
- Estación del ferrocarril San Rafael. Estación del ferrocarril sur. Avenida 1 26–56 26–58 26–60
- Estación del ferrocarril la javilla. Escuela
- Estación del ferrocarril pamplonita o San Luis. Bodega empresas municipales. Diagonal 4 5–35
- Quinta Teresa. Colegio de los hermanos cristianos. Colegio Sagrado Corazón. Calle 16 3–60. Decreto 2007 5-xi-1996 (declara)

==== Cúcuta (alto viento) ====
- Estación del ferrocarril alto viento

==== Cúcuta (El Salado) ====
- Estación del ferrocarril El Salado. Escuela El Salado. Avenida 6 19–40 carrera 50

==== Cúcuta (La Jarra) ====
- Estación del ferrocarril La Jarra

==== Cúcuta (Puerto Santander) ====
- Estación del ferrocarril Puerto Santander. Plaza de mercado

=== Ocaña ===
- Columna de la libertad de los esclavos. Resolución 0620 11 April 2002 (declara)
- Edificio donde se reunió la convención de Ocaña en 1828. Templo de San Francisco. Ley 75 22-ix-1937 (declara)
- Santuario de Nuestra Señora de las Gracias de Torcoroma. Decreto 2861 26-xi-1984 (declara)

=== Pamplona ===
- Casa de Las Marías. Sede del Museo de Arte Moderno. Museo Eduardo Ramírez Villamizar – Calle 5 5–71 5–105 carrera 4 4–94 4–100. Decreto 288 24-ii-1975 (declara)
- Edificio del mercado público. Casa del mercado cubierto de pamplona. Carrera 5 6–28. Resolución 0792 31-vii-1998 (declara)
- Sector antiguo de la ciudad. Sector histórico sin delimitar. Sector histórico. Decreto 264 12-ii-1963 (declara)

=== Pamplonita ===
- Iglesia de Nuestra Señora del Rosario. Decreto 1914 2-xi-1995 (declara)

=== Toledo ===
- Parque nacional natural Tama. Resolución 002 del 12-iii-1982 (propone)

=== Villa del Rosario ===
- Casa donde nació Francisco de Paula Santander. Casa museo Santander. Ley 164 30-xii-1959 (declara)
- Estación del ferrocarril villa del rosario
- Iglesia del rosario de Cúcuta. Iglesia de la villa del rosario de Cúcuta. Templo histórico. Ley 28 11-x-1935 (declara)
- Un sector de la Villa del Rosario de Cúcuta. Sector histórico delimitado. Decreto 102 27-i-1971 (declara)

== Putumayo ==
- Parque nacional natural La Playa

== Quindío ==
=== Armenia ===
- Armenia railway station. Carrera 18 y carrera 19 calle 26
- Ortega Díaz railway station
- Plaza de mercado. Calle 15 calle 16 calle 17 carrera 16 carrera 17 carrera 18

=== La Tebaida ===
- La Tebaida railway station
- Marabelis railway station

=== Montenegro ===
- Montenegro railway station

=== Quimbaya ===
- Carmelitas railway station
- Quimbaya railway station

== Risaralda ==
=== Dosquebradas ===
- Estación del ferrocarril Dosquebradas

=== La Virginia ===
- Estación del ferrocarril Otún

=== Pereira ===
- Edificio de las Rentas Departamentales, en la calle 17 con carrera 10, en la esquina sur occidental
- Estación del ferrocarril Belmonte
- Estación del ferrocarril Pereira, actual biblioteca pública municipal e Instituto de Cultura de Pereira
- Estación del ferrocarril la hoya
- Estación del ferrocarril la marina
- Estación del ferrocarril la Virginia
- Estación del ferrocarril nacederos, en la entrada al aeropuerto
- Estación del ferrocarril Villegas, en la finca Galicia

=== Pereira y Betulia ===
- Estación del ferrocarril Betulia

==== Pereira (La Selva) ====
- La Selva station

==== Pereira (Morelia) ====
- Estación del ferrocarril Morelia

==== Pereira (Puerto Caldas) ====
- Estación del ferrocarril Puerto Caldas

==== Pereira (San Joaquín) ====
- San Joaquín station

=== Santa Rosa de Cabal ===
- Guayabito station
- Gutiérrez station

==== Santa rosa de cabal (la capilla) ====
- Estación del ferrocarril la capilla
- Estación del ferrocarril Santa Rosa de Cabal
- Seminario menor la apostólica. Escuela apostólica. Carrera 7 13–29 alto del rosario

== San Andrés y Providencia ==
=== Providencia ===
- Escuela de María Inmaculada. Freetown

=== San Andrés (La Loma) ===
- Iglesia bautista de La Loma. Iglesia bautista Mission Hill

=== San Andrés – Providencia y Santa Catalina ===
- Fuerte de la libertad

== Santander ==
=== Barichara ===
- Sector antiguo de la ciudad. Sector histórico delimitado. Centro histórico. El sector antiguo parte de la calle 4 con cra 10, hacia el oriente hasta la calle 8, por esta hacia el sur hasta la cra 8, sigue al oriente hasta calle 9, nuevamente al sur hasta cra. 6, luego al occidente hasta calle 8, al sur hasta cra 5, de este punto en sentido sur-occidental hasta cra 4 con calle 7, al sur hasta cra 3, al occidente hasta calle 5, al sur hasta cra 2, al occidente hasta calle 4, al norte hasta cra 3, al occidente hasta calle 3, al norte hasta cra 5, al occidente hasta calle 2, al norte hasta cra 7, al oriente hasta calle 3, al norte hasta cra 9 y en diagonal hacia el nor-oriente hasta encontrar el sitio de partida. Decreto 1654 del 3-viii-1978 (declara)

=== Barichara y Guane ===
- Camino real de Barichara a Guane. Resolución 0790 31-vii-1998 (declara)
- Iglesia parroquial santuario de Santa Lucía. Templo doctrinero. Plaza principal. Resolución 0795 31-vii-1998 (declara)

=== Barrancabermeja ===
- Estación del ferrocarril Barrancabermeja
- Estación del ferrocarril Cuatrobocas
- Estación del ferrocarril Penjamo

=== Bucaramanga ===
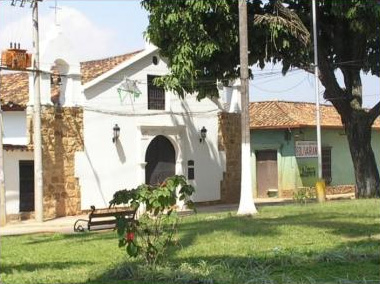
Capilla de los Dolores en Bucaramanga

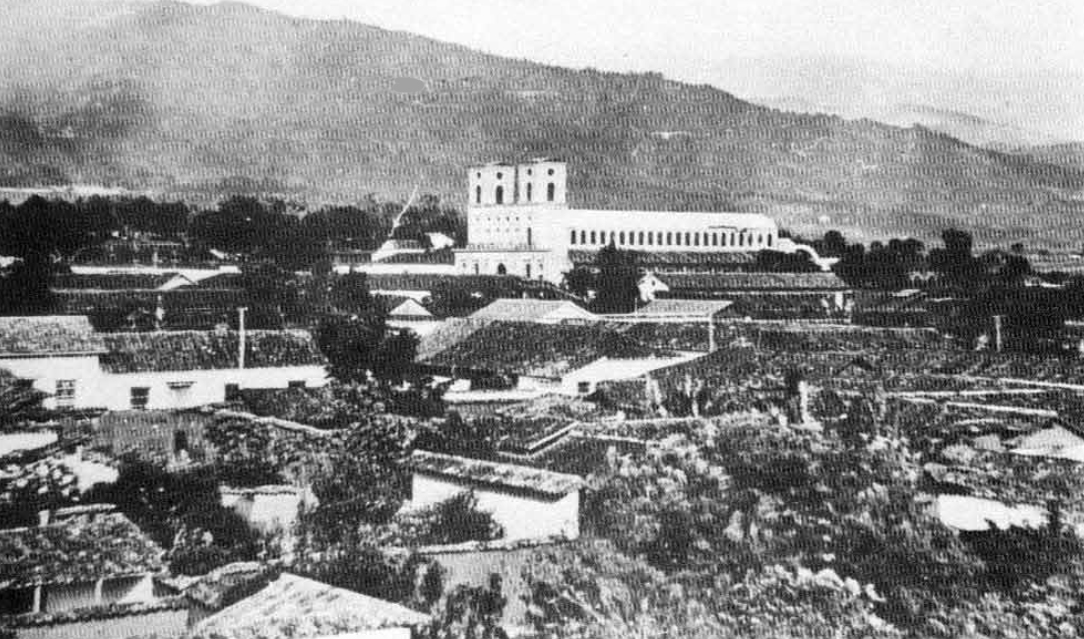
Sagrada Familia Cathedral in the 1920s

- Capilla de los Dolores. Carrera 12 36-08
- Casa de Bolívar. Carrera 12 calle 37 sin dirección
- Casa donde nació el general Custodio García Rovira. Calle 35 8–78
- Club del Comercio. Carrera 20 35-35
- Colegio de Nuestra Señora del Pilar. Colegio San Pedro Claver. Carrera 19 y carrera 20 calle 31 y calle 32
- Coliseo Peralta. Carrera 12 41–70 41–80 calle 42 11–65 11–75 11–85
- Edificio Clausen. Notaría Séptima. Carrera 12 35-05 35-11 35-15 35-17 35-23 calle 35 12-02 12-06 12-10 12–14
- Hotel Bucarica. Carrera 19, calle 35
- Iglesia de la Sagrada Familia. Calle 36 19–56, despacho parroquial
- Iglesia de San Laureano. Carrera 12 36-08 despacho parroquial
- Teatro Garnica (demolido). Carrera 17 calle 33 y calle 34 costado oriental

==== Bucaramanga (Estación Madrid) ====
- Estación del ferrocarril café Madrid

=== Cimitarra ===
- Estación del ferrocarril Carare
- Estación del ferrocarril San Juan

==== Cimitarra (Puerto Olaya) ====
- Estación del ferrocarril Puerto Olaya

=== Confines ===
- Iglesia de San Cayetano. Templo. Decreto 1192 del 26-v-1977 (declara)

=== Girón ===
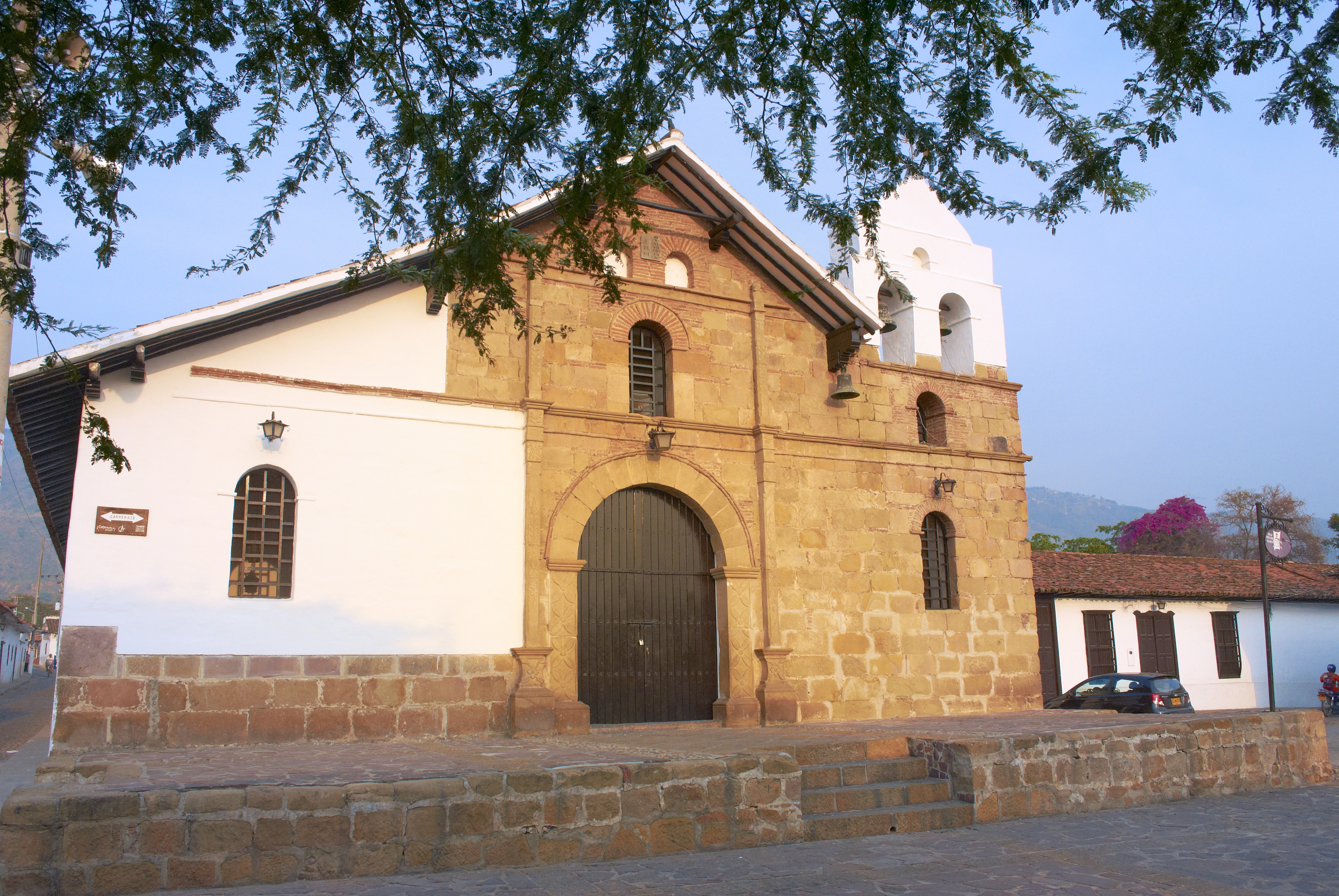
Capilla de Las Nieves en Girón.

- Estación del ferrocarril Palmas
- Sector antiguo de la ciudad. Sector histórico delimitado. Decreto 264 del 12-ii-1963 (declara)

=== Lebrija ===
- Estación del ferrocarril puerto santos

==== Lebrija (Chuspas) ====
- Estación del ferrocarril Chuspas

==== Lebrija (Conchal) ====
- Estación del ferrocarril Conchal

==== Lebrija (Vanegas) ====
- Estación del ferrocarril Vanegas

=== Matanza ===
- Iglesia de Nuestra Señora de las mercedes. Plaza principal. Resolución 659 2-v- 2001 (declara)

=== Puente Nacional ===
- Estación de ferrocarril Límites
- Estación del ferrocarril Guayabo

==== Puente Nacional (Providencia) ====
- Estación del ferrocarril Providencia
- Estación del ferrocarril Puente Nacional

==== Puente Nacional (Los Robles) ====
- Estación del ferrocarril Los Robles

=== Puerto Wilches ===
- El Cruce railway station
- García Cadena railway station
- Estación del ferrocarril González-Vásquez
- Estación del ferrocarril Puerto Wilches

==== Puerto Wilches (puente Sogamoso) ====
- Sogamoso railway station

=== Rionegro ===
- Lebrija railway station

=== Sabana de Torres ===
- Celestino Mutis station
- Comuneros station
- Eloy Valenzuela station

==== Sabana de Torres (Provincia) ====
- Provincia railway station
- Sabana de Torres railway station

==== Sabana de Torres (Sabaneta) ====
- Sabaneta railway station

=== San Gil ===
- Colegio universitario San José y San Pedro de alcántara de Guanenta. Casona de la Normal. Carrera 10 11–27. Decreto 2862 del 26-xi-1984 (declara)
- Sector antiguo de la ciudad. Sector histórico sin delimitar. Decreto 264 del 12-ii-1963 (declara)

=== Simacota ===
- Opón railway station
- Pulpapel railway station

==== Simacota (Viscaina alta) ====
- Viscaina railway station

=== Socorro ===
- Casa de la cultura. Casa de berbeo. Calle 14 12–17 12–27 12–35 12–39
- Puente comuneros. A 6 km de la población
- Sector antiguo de la ciudad. Centro histórico de Socorro

=== Vélez ===
- Edificio colonial donde funciona el colegio universitario. Antiguo convento de San Francisco de Vélez
- Estación del ferrocarril Montoyas

== Sucre ==
=== San Benito Abad ===
- Basílica menor del Señor de Los Milagros

== Tolima ==
=== Alvarado, Caldas station ===
- Caldas railway station

=== Ambalema ===
- Historical center of the city
- Ambalema railway station
- Beltrán railway station

=== Armero (Guayabal) ===
- Armero railway station
- San Felipe railway station

=== Coello (Gualanday) ===
- Gualanday railway station

=== Coyaima ===
- Coyaima railway station

==== Coyaima (Castilla) ====
- Castilla railway station

=== Espinal ===
- Espinal railway station
- Santa Ana railway station

==== El Espinal (Chicoral) ====
- Chicoral railway station

=== Guamo ===
- Guamo railway station

=== Honda ===
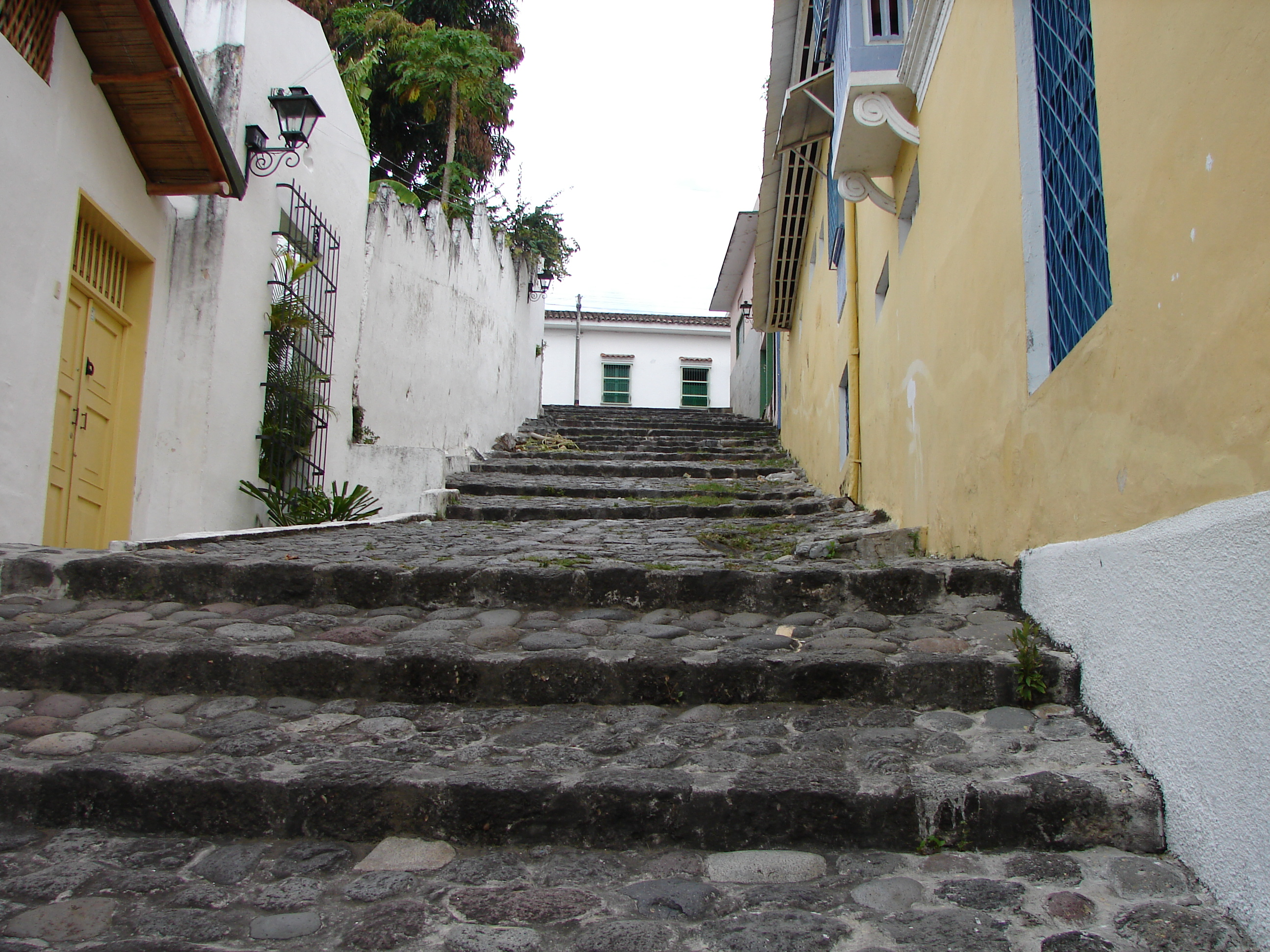
Carrera de las Trampas en el sector antiguo de Honda

- Estación del ferrocarril Alfonso López
- Estación del ferrocarril Honda
- Estación del ferrocarril Perico
- Plaza de mercado. Calle 13 carrera 13
- Puente Navarro across the Magdalena River
- Sector antiguo de la ciudad. Sector histórico delimitado

=== Ibagué ===
- Antiguo panóptico. Picalena calle 10 calle 11, carrera 8 carrera 9
- Edificio principal de la granja San Jorge. Carrera 8 calle 19 2 km al oriente. Sector de calambeo
- La edificación e instalaciones del conservatorio de música Alberto Castilla
- Salón Alberto Castilla y la colección de lienzos de Domingo Moreno Otero
- Teatro Tolima. Carrera 3 11–76

==== Ibagué (Buenos Aires) ====
- Estación del ferrocarril Buenos Aires

==== Ibagué (Picalena) ====
- Estación del ferrocarril picalena

=== Mariquita ===
- Estación del ferrocarril Mariquita
- Sector antiguo de la ciudad. Sector histórico sin delimitar

=== Natagaima ===
- Estación del ferrocarril Belu
- Estación del ferrocarril Campamento Dussan
- Estación del ferrocarril Natagaima

=== Piedras (doima) ===
- Estación del ferrocarril Doima

=== Saldaña ===
- Estación del ferrocarril Saldaña

=== Venadillo (palmarrosa) ===
- Palmarrosa railway station

=== Tolima – Valle ===
==== (Flandes – Cali) ====
- Conjunto de antiguas locomotoras a vapor en Colombia

== Valle del Cauca ==
=== Andalucía ===
- Andalucía railway station

=== Buenaventura ===
- Buenaventura railway station
- Pailón railway station
- Triana railway station

==== Buenaventura (Cisneros) ====
- Cisneros railway station

==== Buenaventura (Córdoba) ====
- Córdoba railway station

=== Buga ===
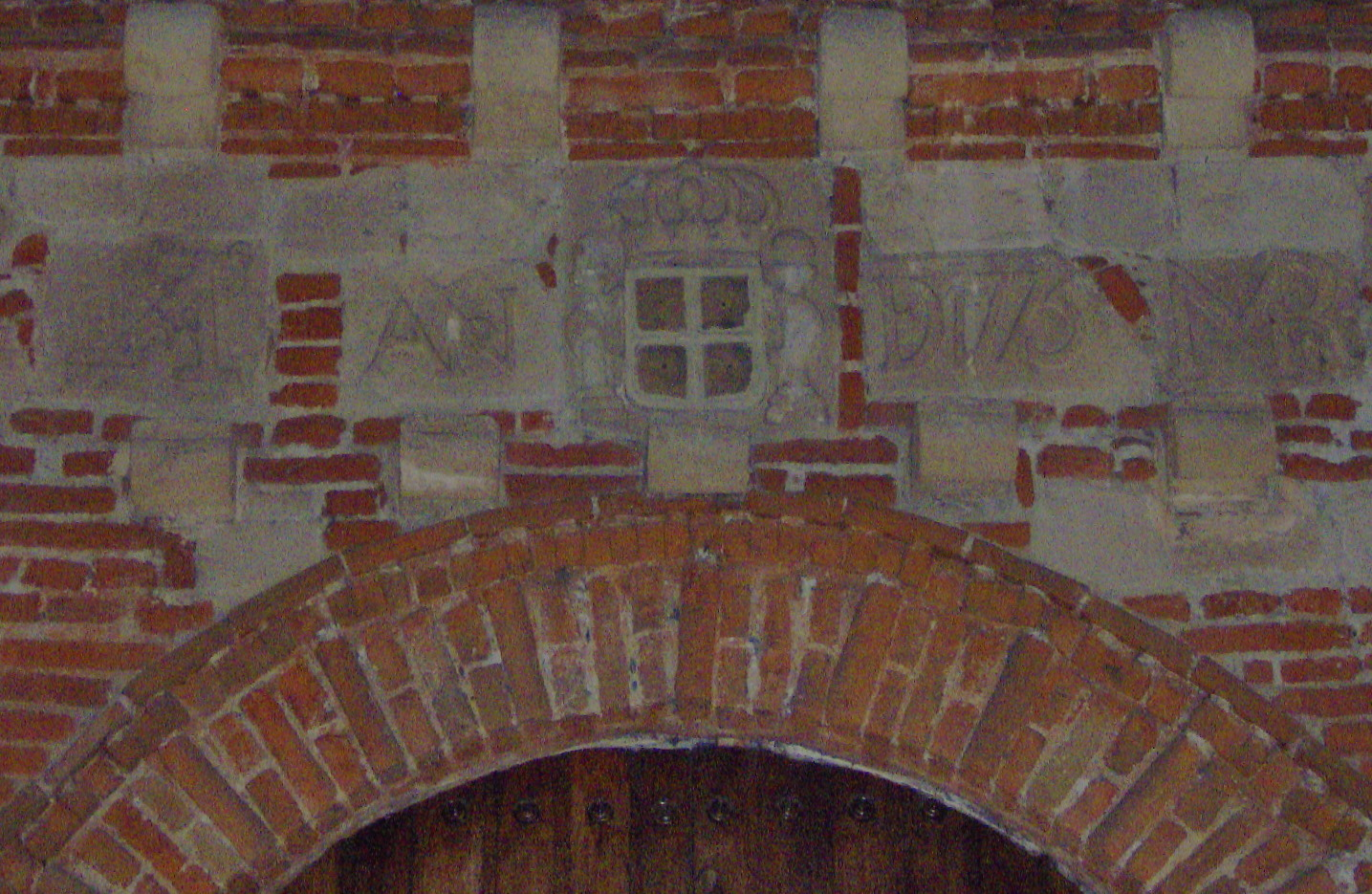
Coat of arms of Buga

- La Julia ranch house
- Buga railway station
- Historic district of the city
- Municipal theater

=== Bugalagrande ===
- Bugalagrande railway station
- La Uribe railway station

==== Bugalagrande (El Overo) ====
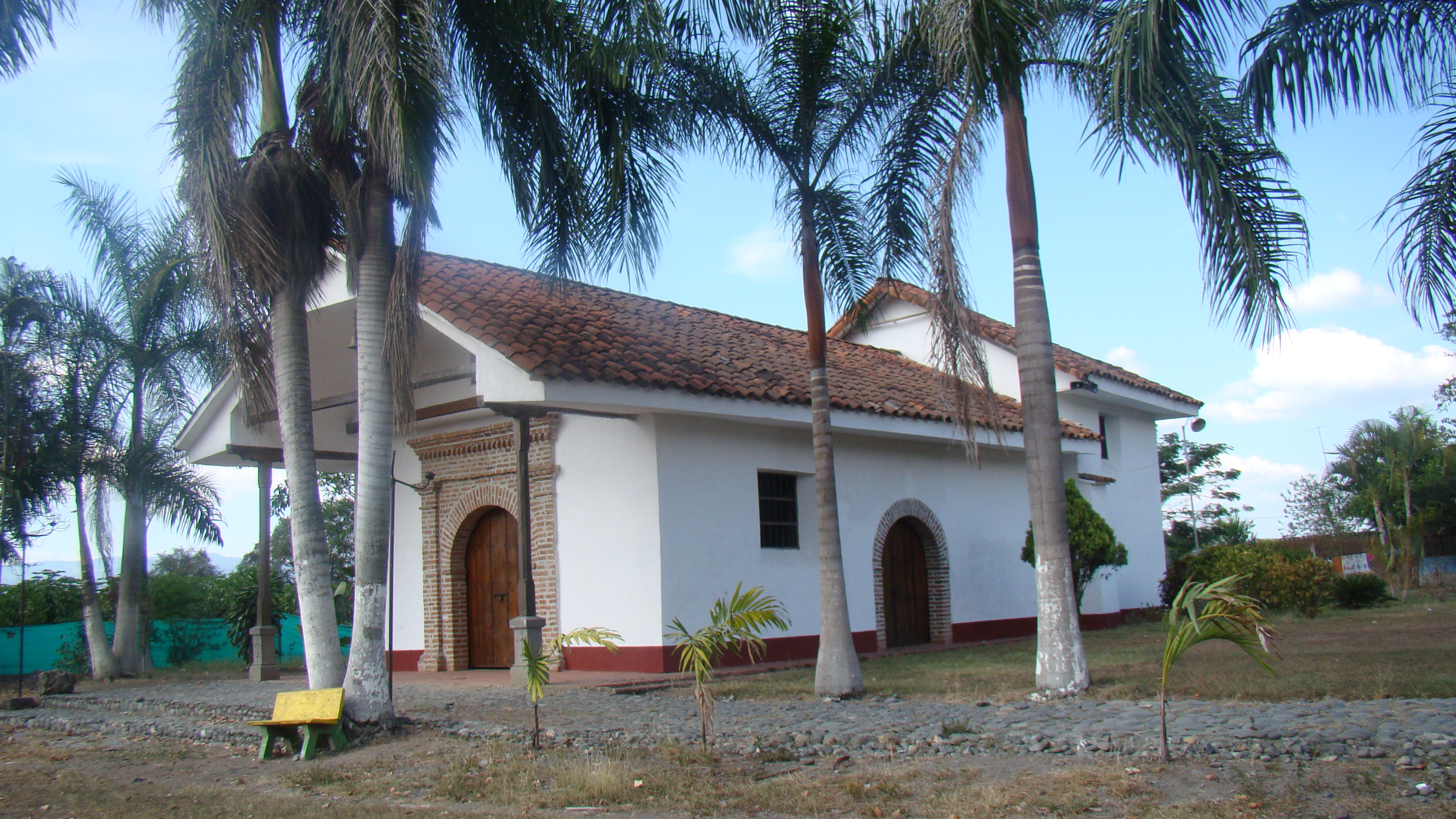
Chapel of Our Lady of Conception

- Chapel of Our Lady of Conception (or El Overo Chapel)

=== Caicedonia ===
- Caicedonia railway station

=== Cali ===
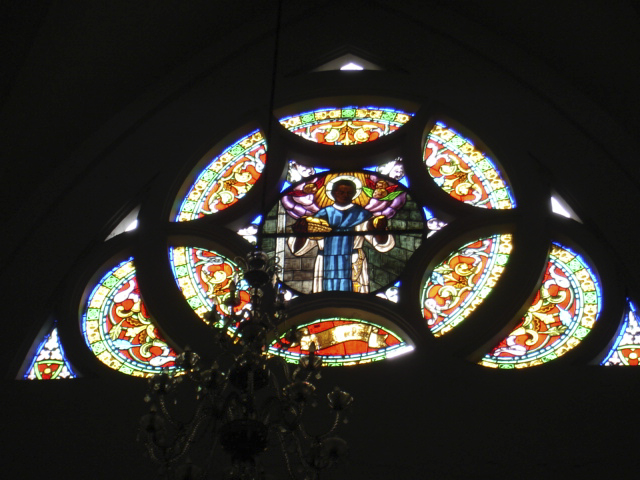
Vitrales de la San Pedro Cathedral

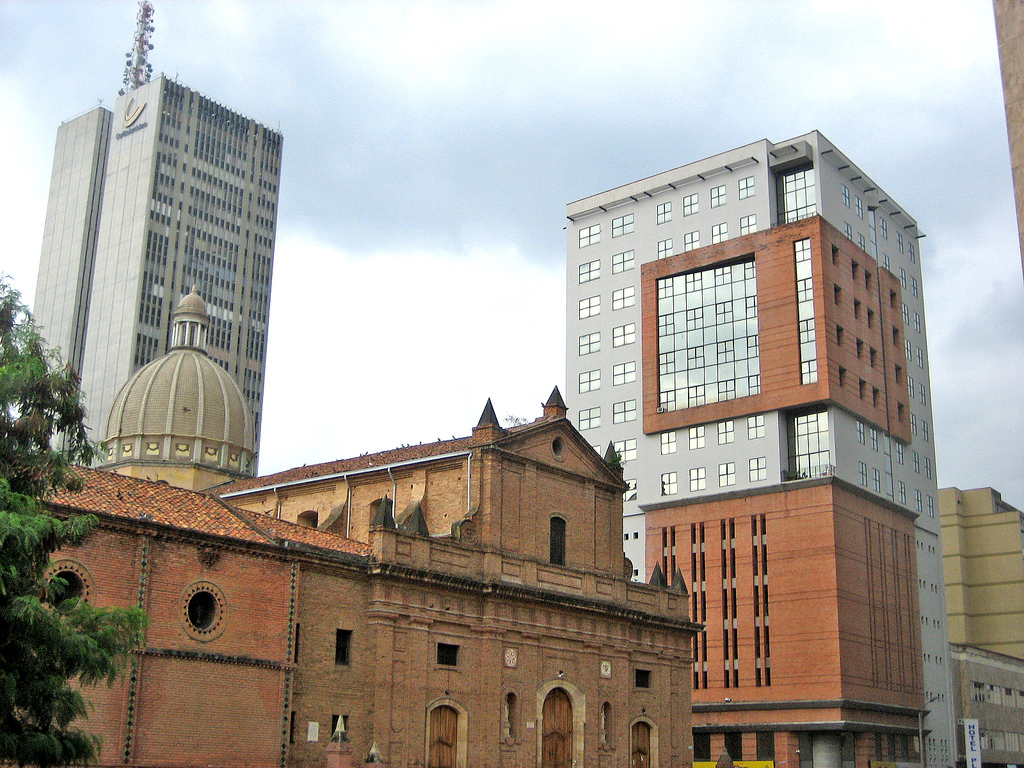
Plaza e San Francisco Church

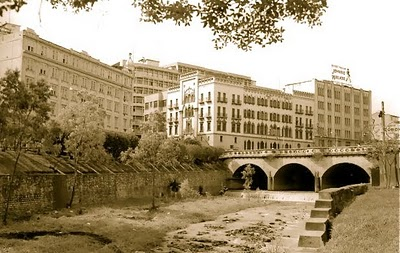
Puente Ortiz, sobre el Cali River

- Casa de hacienda Piedragrande. Carrera 118 a carrera 120 calle 42 a calle 45. Contigua a la hacienda canas gordas
- Catedral de San Pedro
- Edificio Otero. Plaza San Cayetano calle 12 entre carrera 4 y carrera 5
- Estación del ferrocarril. Avenida 2 calle 25
- Estación del ferrocarril La Viga
- Hospital universitario Evaristo García. Calle 5 36-08
- Iglesia de San Antonio
- Iglesia de San Francisco
- Iglesia y convento de La Merced
- La casona de la hacienda Cañas Gordas. Autopista Simón Bolívar carrera 109 sur de la ciudad
- Palacio Nacional. Plaza Caycedo calle 12 entre carrera 4 y carrera 5
- Parque Panamericano. Calle 5
- Plaza de Toros. Calle 5 con avenida Guadalupe
- Puente Ortiz. Puente peatonal
- Sector antiguo de la ciudad. Sector histórico delimitado
- Teatro Jorge Isaacs. Calle 12 entre carrera 3 y carrera 4
- Teatro municipal. Carrera 5 n° 6 – 64 Cali

=== Cali – Buenaventura – Dagua – Jamundí ===
- Parque Nacional Natural los Farallones de Cali – Resolución 002 del 12-iii-1982 (propone)

=== Cartago ===
- Casa del Virrey. Casa de Marisancena. Casa de la cadena. Calle 13 4–29 4–53. Resolución 006 del 30-v-1997 (propone)
- Estación del ferrocarril Cartago. Calle 6 calle 8 calle 9
- Iglesia de Nuestra Señora de Guadalupe. Iglesia de la Virgen de Guadalupe. Carrera 4 calle 6. Resolución 0789 31-vii-1998 (declara)
- Sector antiguo de la ciudad. Centro histórico de Cartago. Ley 163 del 30-xii-1959 (declara)

=== Dagua ===
- Estación del ferrocarril Dagua
- Estación del ferrocarril Punta Dagua
- Estación del ferrocarril San Joaquín
- Estación del ferrocarril Vásquez Cobo

==== Dagua (El Naranjo) ====
- Estación del ferrocarril El Naranjo

==== Dagua (el palmar) ====
- Estación del ferrocarril El Palmar

==== Dagua (la ventura) ====
- Estación del ferrocarril Ventura

==== Dagua (lobo guerrero) ====
- Estación del ferrocarril lobo Guerrero

=== El Cerrito ===
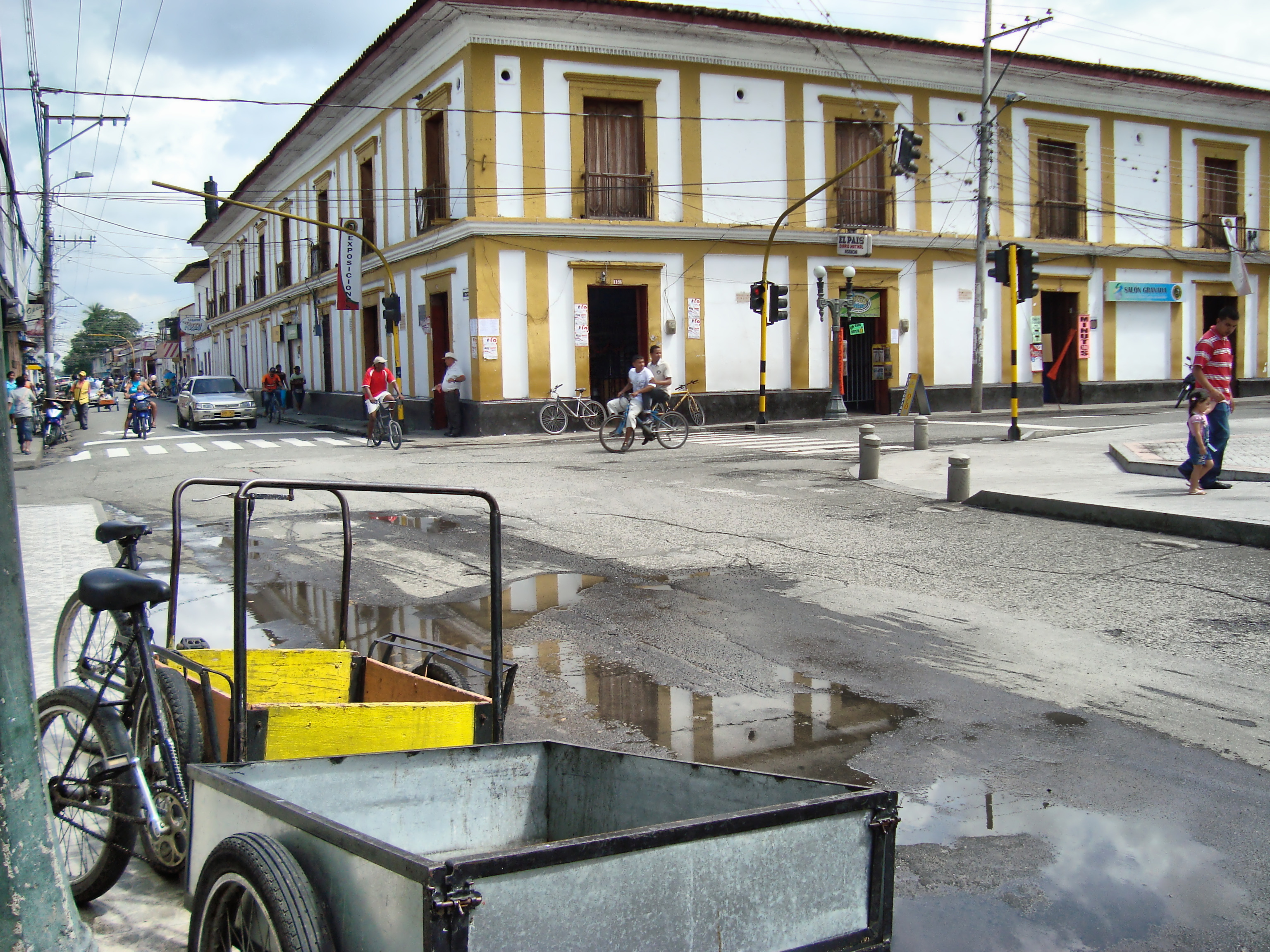
El Cerrito main square

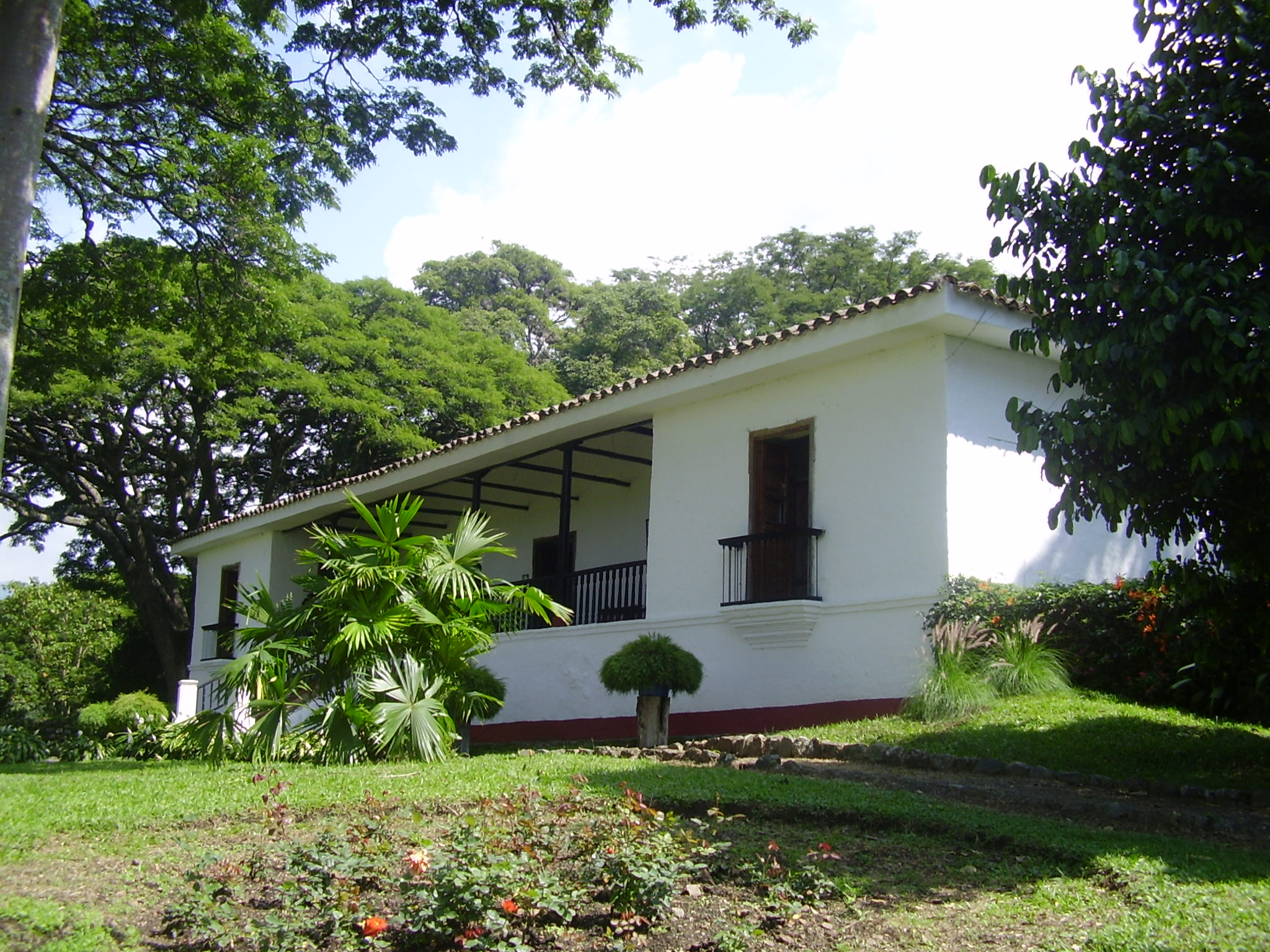
El Paraíso ranch

- Piedechinche ranch house, today a sugar cane museum
- La Merced ranch house
- Casa de hacienda La Esmeralda. A los pies de la cordillera central
- Casa de hacienda La Rita
- Casa de hacienda El Alisal. Vía que conduce del ingenio providencia al corregimiento de rozo, frente a las líneas del ferrocarril
- Estación del ferrocarril El Cerrito
- Hacienda El Albión. Carretera panamericana a la derecha del tramo comprendido entre El Cerrito e ingenio Providencia
- Hacienda El Paraíso. Casa de la sierra y capilla. A 42 kilómetros de Cali por la vía que conduce de El Placer a Santa Elena
- Hacienda el Trejo Plata. Vía Cerrito – Rozo, desviación cerca a la vuelta el vapor
- Hacienda La Aurora
- Sector antiguo de la ciudad. Centro histórico de El Cerrito

=== Florida ===
- Casa de hacienda Perodias
- La Concordia ranch house
- Casa de hacienda Garciabajo. Cerca a la cordillera por la parte plana entre Corinto y Miranda
- Casa de hacienda El Hato. Valle del alto Cauca
- Casa de hacienda la aurora. A 1,5 km de la plaza principal del municipio por la vía Panamericana
- Casa de hacienda la industria

=== Guacari ===
- Casa cural. Antigua casa de hacienda. Decreto 738 del 22-iv-1976 (declara)
- Guacari station

=== Jamundí ===
- Jamundí station

==== Jamundí (Guachinte) ====
- Guachinte station

==== Jamundí (Timba) ====
- Timba station

=== La Cumbre ===
- Bitaco station
- La Cumbre station

==== La Cumbre (Lomitas) ====
- Lomitas station

=== La Victoria ===
- La Victoria station

=== Obando ===
- Obando station

=== Palmira ===
- Catedral de Nuestra Señora del Rosario del Palmar. Catedral de Palmira. Calle 30 29–69 esquina
- Edificio antigua Alcaldía
- Palmira station. Carrera 33a calle 29 calle 30
- Rioclaro station
- Parte antigua de la facultad de Agronomía de la Universidad Nacional

==== Palmira (Amaime) ====
- Hacienda La Concepción

==== Palmira (Caucaseco) ====
- Caucaseco station

==== Palmira (Guanabanal) ====
- Estación del ferrocarril Guanabanal

==== Palmira (la manuelita) ====
- Estación del ferrocarril la manuelita

=== Pradera ===
- Estación del ferrocarril Pradera.

=== San Pedro ===
- Estación del ferrocarril San Pedro

=== Sevilla (corozal) ===
- Estación del ferrocarril Corozal

=== Toro ===
- Iglesia de Nuestra Señora del Carmen. Iglesia de Nuestra Señora de la Consolación

=== Tuluá ===
- Estación del ferrocarril Tuluá

=== Valle del Cauca – Tolima ===
(Tulúa – Buga – Palmira – Pradera – Chaparral – Rioblanco)

- Parque nacional natural las hermosas

=== Ulloa ===
- Estación del ferrocarril Ulloa

=== Yotoco ===
- Hatoviejo ranch house
- Garzonero ranch house

=== Yumbo ===
- Estación del ferrocarril Yumbo

==== Yumbo (Puerto Isaacs) ====
- Puerto Isaacs railway station

=== Zarzal ===
- Álvarez Salas railway station
- Zarzal railway station

==== Zarzal (La Paila) ====
- La Paila railway station

==== Zarzal (Vallejuelo) ====
- Vallejuelo railway station

== Vichada ==
- El Tuparro National Natural Park

== Colombia nation-wide ==
- Conjunto de las estaciones de pasajeros del ferrocarril en Colombia
- Conjunto de las antiguas ferrerías en Colombia
- Primeras pruebas de galeras de la obra Cien años de soledad, correcciones de Gabriel García Márquez
