= Santander Park =

Park in Cúcuta, Colombia

Coordinates: 7.886°N 72.504°W

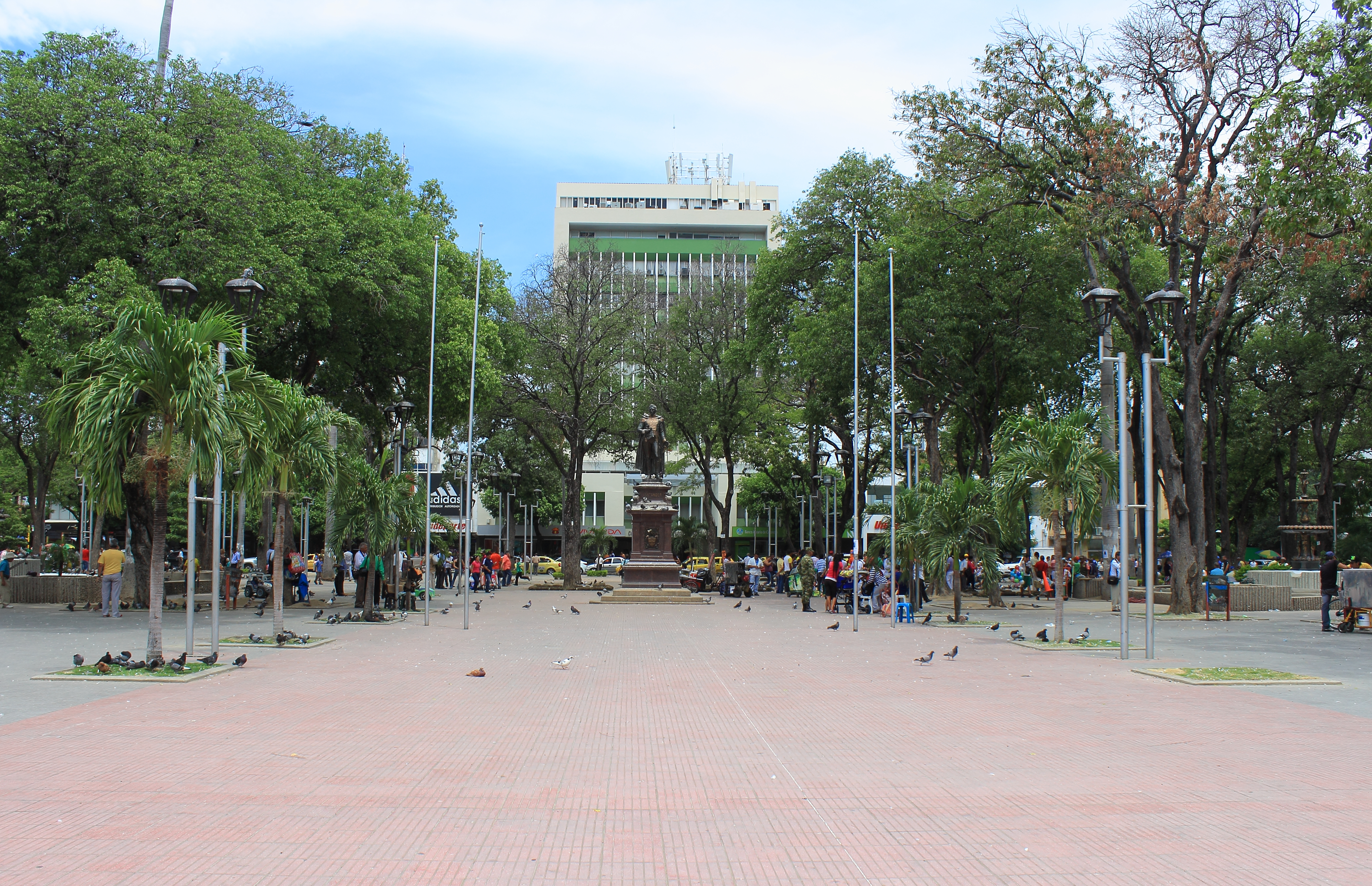
Statue of Francisco de Paula Santander in Santander Park

Santander Park (Spanish: Parque Santander) is located in Cúcuta, Colombia. The park is bordered by 5th and 6th Avenue and 10th and 11th Street and was previously the location of the Grand Square of San José de Guasimales, a site hosting principal events and public spectacles in Cúcuta. In the center of the park is a bronze statue of the Cúcuta-born Francisco de Paula Santander, created by the German sculptor Carl Bornr and unveiled on August 5, 1890.

The Cathedral of San José and Cúcuta's city hall are located at the park's edges.

== See also ==
- House of Santander
- Historic church of Cúcuta
- House of the Bagatela
- Great Colombian Park
