= Cúcuta =

Municipality of Colombia in North Santander

- Municipality
- San José de Cúcuta
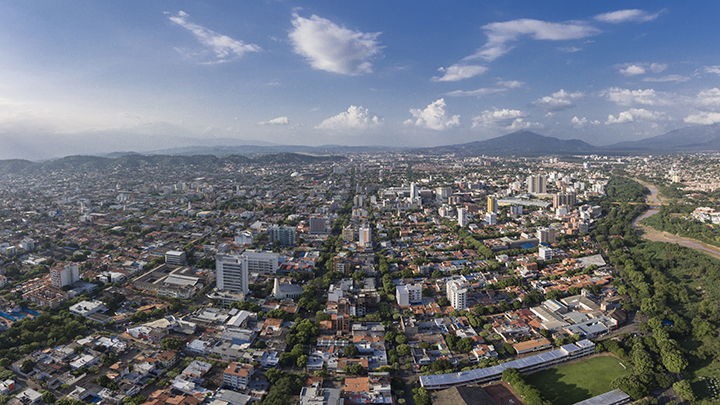
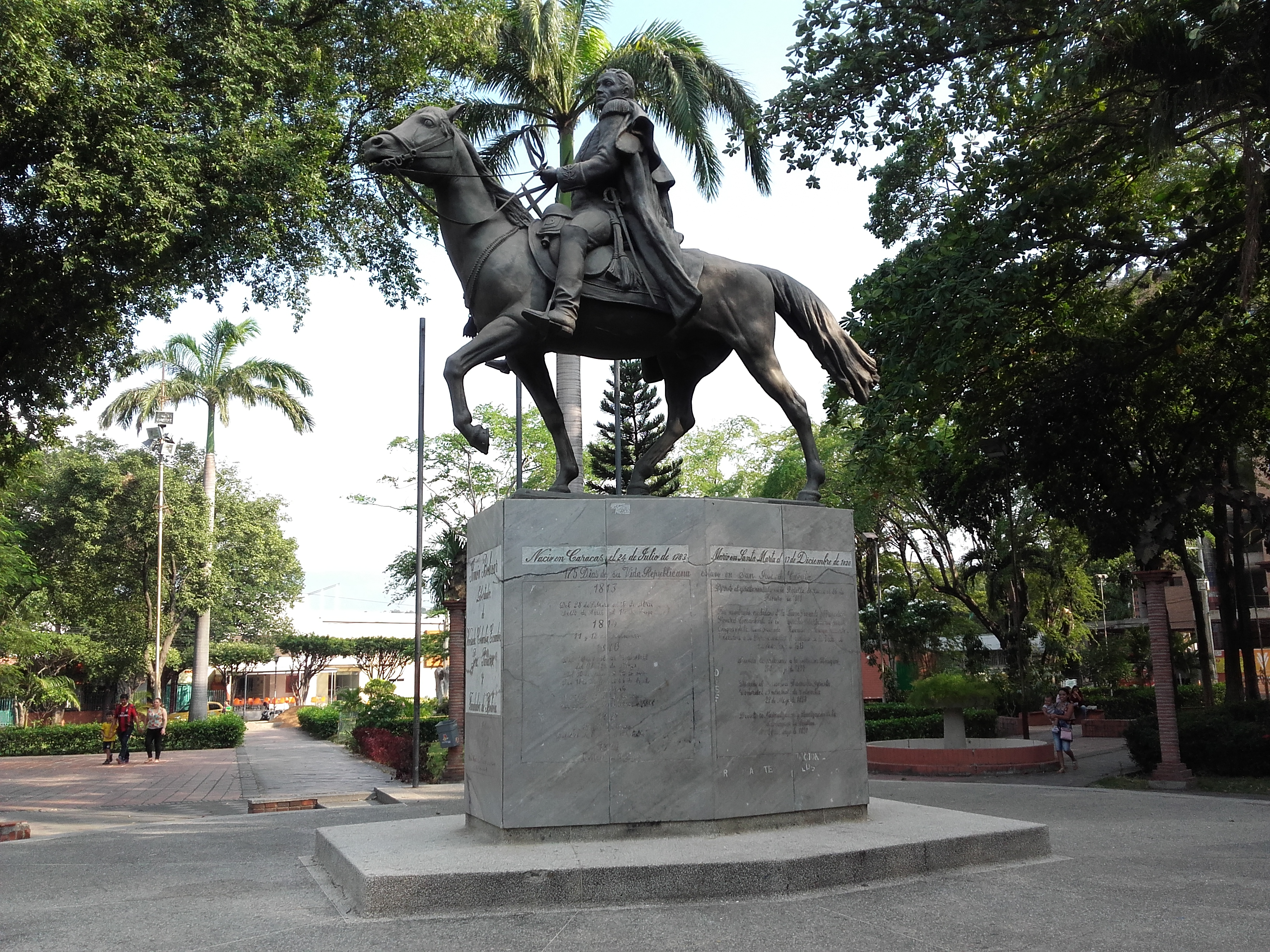
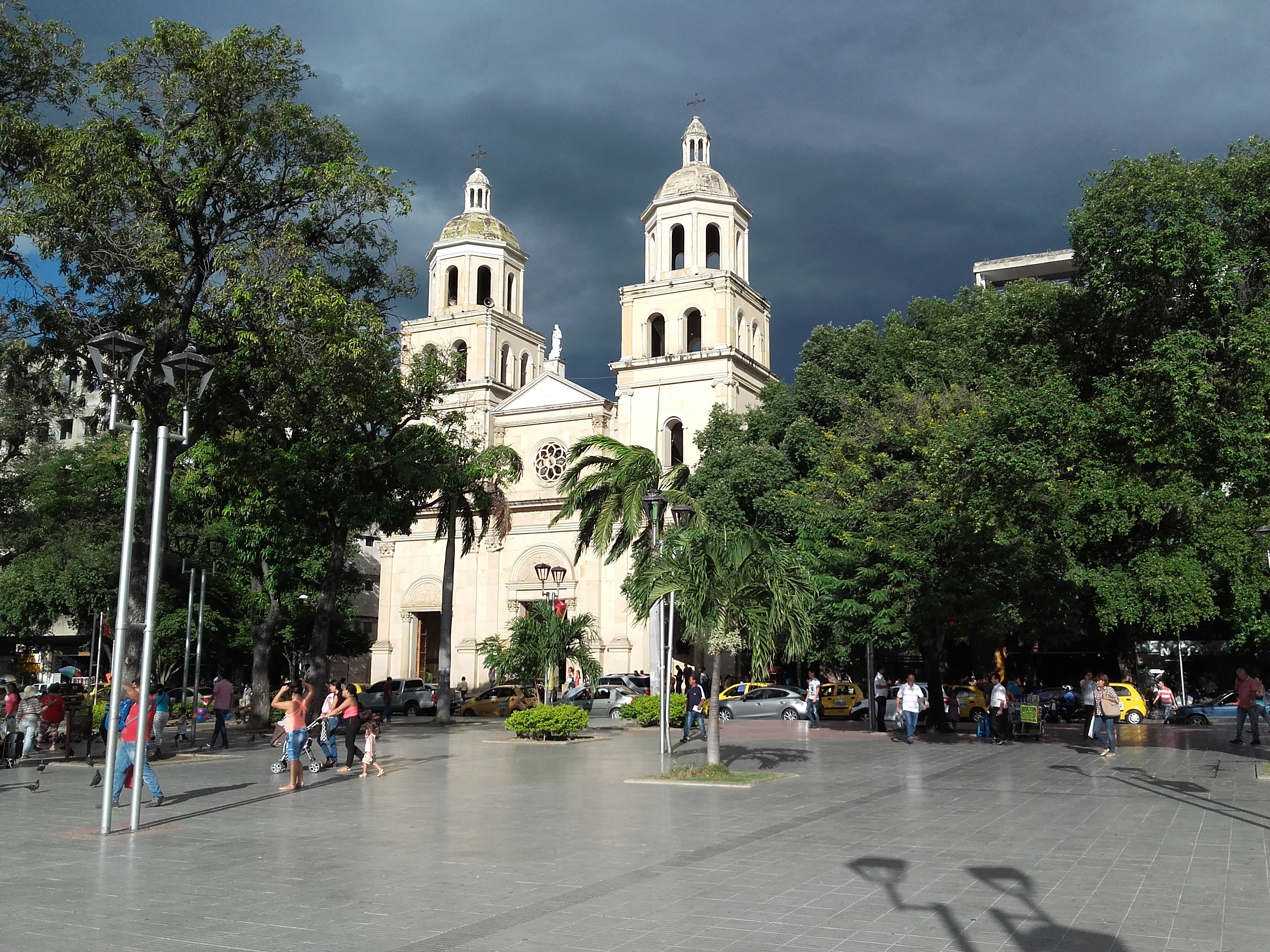
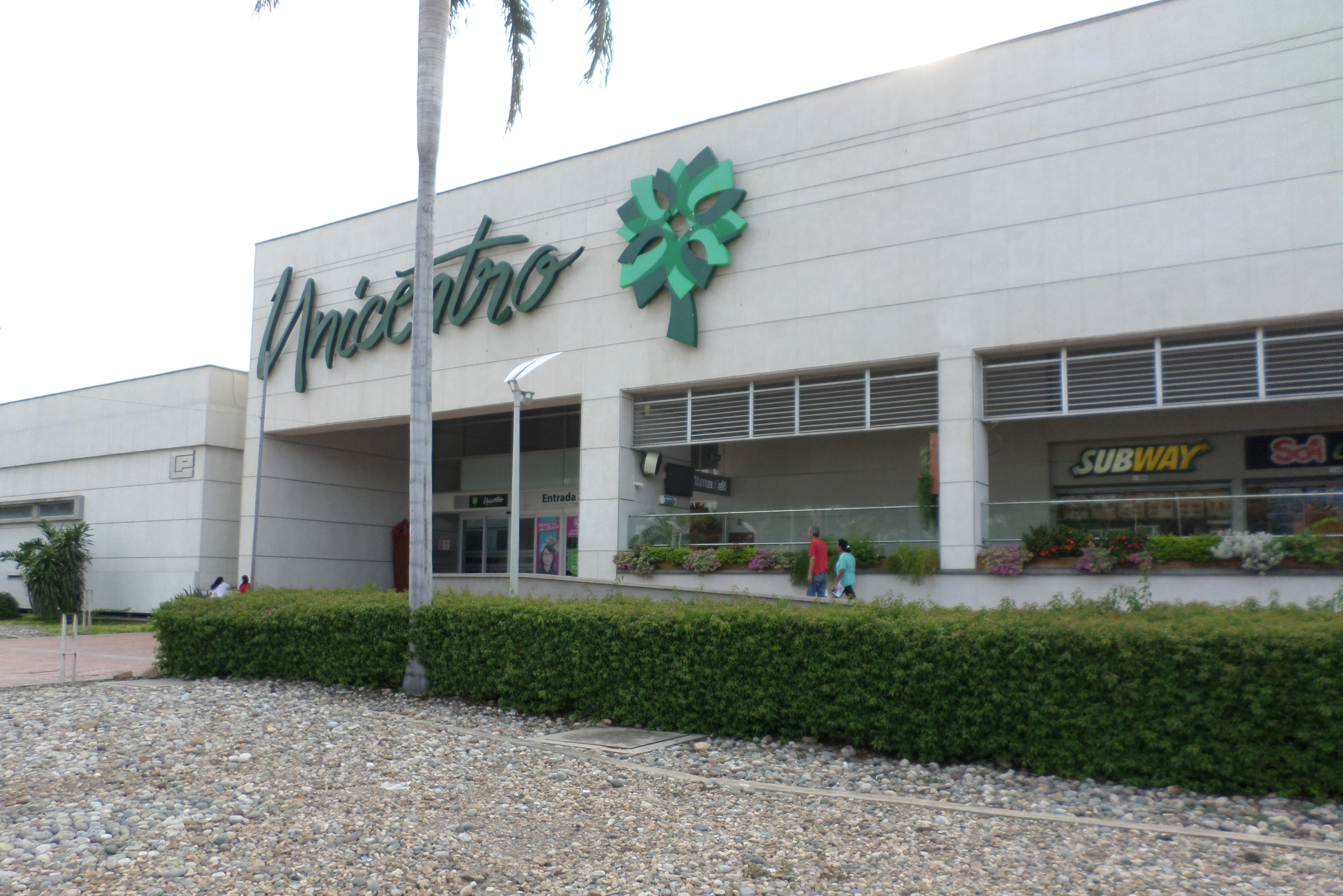
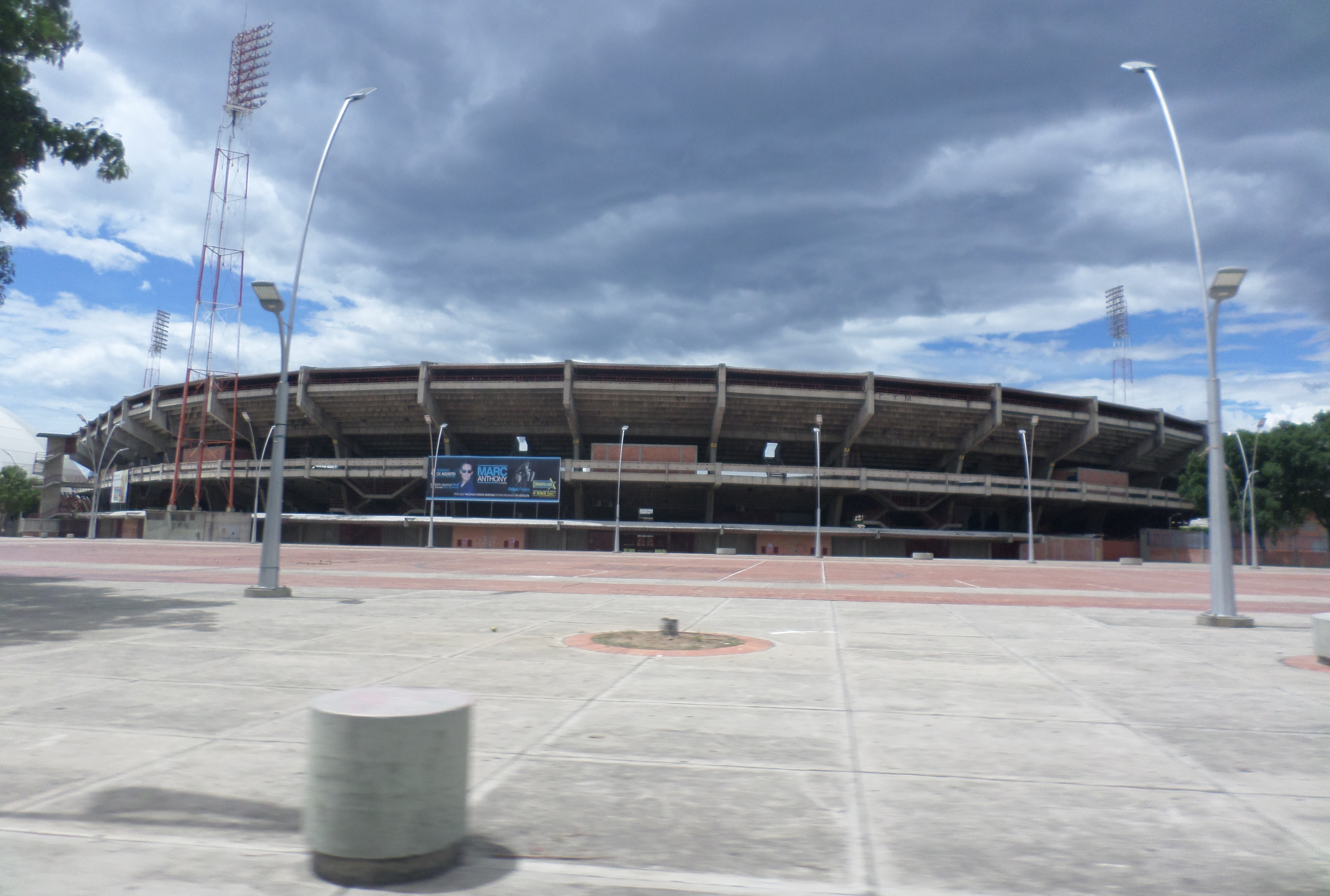
- Panoramic of Cúcuta Simón Bolívar statue Saint Joseph Cathedral Unicentro shopping center General Santander stadium

- Flag Coat of arms
- Nicknames: La Perla del Norte (The Pearl of the North), Portón de la Frontera (Gate of the Border), La Ciudad Verde (Green City), La Ciudad de los Árboles (City of Trees), La Capital Basquetera de Colombia (The Basketball Capital of Colombia)
- Motto: Muy Noble, Valerosa y Leal Villa (Very Noble, Valiant and Loyal Village)
- Cúcuta in Department of Norte de Santander. Urbanized area in dark gray, municipality in red.

- Location in Colombia
- Coordinates: 7°53′39″N 72°30′14″W
- Country: Colombia
- Department: Norte de Santander
- Foundation: June 17, 1733
- Founder: Juana Rangel de Cuéllar

Government
  - Mayor: Jorge Acevedo Peñaloza (2024–2027)

Area
  - Municipality: 1,119 km^{2} (432 sq mi)
- Elevation: 320 m (1,050 ft)

Population (2018 census)
  - Municipality: 777,106
  - Rank: 6th in Colombia
  - Density: 694.5/km^{2} (1,799/sq mi)
  - Urban: 748,948
  - Metro: 1,046,347
- Demonym: Cucuteño(a)
- Time zone: UTC−5 (COL)
- Postal code: 540000-19
- Area code: 57 + 7
- Website: cucuta-nortedesantander.gov.co (in Spanish)

Cúcuta (Spanish: [ˈkukuta]), officially San José de Cúcuta, is a Colombian municipality, capital of the department of Norte de Santander and nucleus of the Metropolitan Area of Cúcuta. The city is located in the homonymous valley, beneath the Eastern Ranges of the Colombian Andes, on the border with Venezuela.

Cúcuta comprises an area of approximately 1119 km^{2}, with an urban area of 64 km^{2} (divided into 10 communes) and a rural area of 1055 km^{2} (divided into 10 townships). The city has a population of 777,106 inhabitants, which makes it the most populous municipality in the department and the sixth most populous municipality in the country. Similarly, its metropolitan area (made up of the municipalities of Villa del Rosario, Los Patios, El Zulia, San Cayetano and Puerto Santander) has an approximate population of 1,046,347.

The city was founded as a parish on June 17, 1733, by Juana Rangel de Cuéllar, a resident of Pamplona, under the name San José de Guasimales, as part of an initiative of the white and mestizo locals to separate themselves from the "Indian Village of Cúcuta" (currently San Luis Quarter). The name was later changed to San José de Cúcuta, a Hispanicization of "Kuku-ta", in honor of the indigenous people of the region. From its foundation in the 18th century and throughout the Spanish viceroyalty, the parish was consolidated as one of the most important settlements of the Colombian East and Spanish America, receiving in 1792 the title of "Very Noble, Valiant and Loyal Village" from King Charles IV of Spain.

The city is the political, economic, industrial, artistic, cultural, sports and tourist center of Norte de Santander. Together with the Venezuelan city of San Cristóbal, it is the most important urban settlement on the Colombian–Venezuelan border, owing to its trade and its role in the consolidation of the modern states of Colombia and Venezuela and their diplomatic relations. It hosted the Battle of Cúcuta of 1813 and the Congress of Cúcuta of 1821 in Villa del Rosario, and in more recent times the signing of the 1941 Treaty of Limits between Colombia and Venezuela, the 1959 Treaty of Tonchalá, and the charity concerts Peace Without Borders (2008) and Venezuela Aid Live (2019). It also played a significant role during Colombian immigration to Venezuela and has more recently become one of the most important transit points of the Venezuelan migration crisis.

As the capital of Norte de Santander, Cúcuta houses the main governmental bodies of departmental order such as the Government of Norte de Santander, the Assembly of Norte de Santander, the Superior Court of the Judicial District of Cúcuta, the Administrative Court of Norte de Santander, the regional branches of the Superior Council of the Judiciary and the Office of the Inspector General of Colombia. Cúcuta is connected by road with Bogotá, Bucaramanga, Valledupar, and Cartagena de Indias and, by its border location, with Venezuela. It has an air terminal, the Camilo Daza International Airport, and a ground terminal, the Central de Transportes de Cúcuta.

Its flagship university is the Francisco de Paula Santander University, one of the most important universities in eastern Colombia. It also has the presence of other universities of local and national renown, such as the University of Pamplona, the FESC, the Free University of Colombia, the Simón Bolivar University, the University of Santander, and the Saint Thomas University, among others.

== Etymology ==
Like most Spanish colonial foundations in the Americas, the city has a composite name. San José, one of the most widespread place names on the continent, honors Saint Joseph. The name of Cúcuta was taken in honor of the cacique Kuku-ta «Cúcuta in Spanish» and represents the Motilon-Bari indigenous people who inhabited the region before the conquest. Kuku-ta in the native language means "House of the Goblin". The city was known as San José de Guasimales from 1733 to 1793, when it changed to its current name.

The coat of arms of the city carries the legend "Muy Noble, Valerosa y Leal Villa de San José de Cúcuta" ("Very Noble, Valiant and Loyal Village of San José de Cúcuta"), a title granted by King Charles IV of Spain through a royal decree shortly before the end of the 18th century. The grant was obtained with the help of José María Maldona, a lawyer of the Royal Audience, who formally presented the petition for the title of villa to Viceroy José Manuel de Ezpeleta on behalf of the city's inhabitants.

The city has the nicknames "The Pearl of the North", "Gate of the Border", "Green City", "City of Trees", and "The Basketball Capital of Colombia".

== History ==
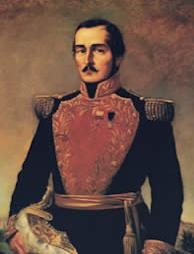
General Santander

Cúcuta was originally a pre-hispanic settlement. It was entrusted to Sebastian Lorenzo by Pedro de Ursua as an encomienda in 1550. Juana Rangel de Cuellar founded Cúcuta on June 17, 1733, and donated a further 782 hectares (1,930 acres). The village, centred on a church, grew considerably due to its strategic commercial location, and eventually became a city.

Several important events that forged Colombia as an independent republic took place in the city: one of these events was the Congress of 1821, where the Constitution of Cúcuta was written and approved. This constitution created Greater Colombia, a country embracing the present-day territories of Colombia, Venezuela, Ecuador, and Panama. The city preserves places where these historical events took place: the Historical Church of Cúcuta, the House of Santander, and the Park of Greater Colombia.

As the site of the Battle of Cúcuta (February 28, 1813), the city was the beginning of the Admirable Campaign led by Simón Bolívar. This campaign resulted in the independence of Venezuela.

=== 16th century: First European incursions ===
The first European in the North Santander territories was the German conquistador Ambrosio Alfinger, who came from Santa Ana de Coro (Venezuela) in 1530 with a troop of adventurers, and invaded the unexplored eastern region of the newly created Governorate of Santa Marta.

Alfinger, in search of El Dorado, arrived in an area of indigenous settlements called Tamalameque along the Magdalena River, fighting and defeating several tribes. Alfinger was eventually killed in the outskirts of present-day Chinácota in a battle with Chimila and Chitarero. With Alfinger dead, Fedro St. Martin took command of the troops and returned to Coro, passing through the territory of Cúcuta.

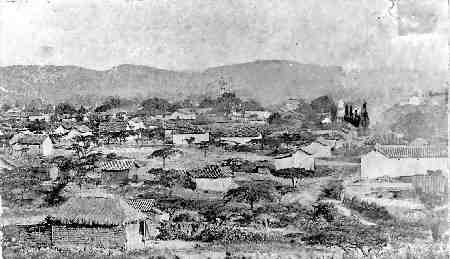
Cúcuta. 19th century

In 1541, Hernán Pérez de Quesada reached the territory of Chinácota, but had to turn back the same year due to resistance by the indigenous people. Shortly thereafter, Alfonso Perez de Tolosa left El Tocuyo (Venezuela) and went to Salazar de Las Palmas, through Cúcuta, but also had to turn back after losing many soldiers in clashes with the natives.

In 1549, Spanish troops, commanded by Pedro de Ursúa and Ortún Velasco, invaded North Santander and reached the valley of Pamplona. In tribute to the Spanish city of Pamplona, the Spaniards founded the city of Pamplona. The new town soon attracted numerous people because of its agreeable climate, and gold mines that were discovered in the region. Further expeditions left this town and completed the conquest of the current territory of North Santander.

An expedition commanded by Diego de Montes founded the town of Salazar, but it was soon destroyed by the cacique Cínera. In 1583, the town was rebuilt by Alonso Esteban Rangel (great-grandfather of the founder of Cúcuta), on a site more appropriate for its defense in the event of new attacks by the natives.

The second expedition, commanded by Captain Francisco Fernández de Contreras, reached the lands of the Hacaritamas indigenous group and, on July 26, 1572, founded the city of Ocaña, calling it "Santa Ana de Hacarí". Some of his colleagues named it New Madrid, and others Santa Ana of Ocaña. The next year, Antonio Orozco, a subaltern of Fernández, founded the town of Teorama, while the Augustinian Friars founded a convent in what is today the city of Chinácota.

=== 17th century: Foundation ===
"A journey through the city centre where the Cathedral of St. Joseph, the Palace of Government and the Monument to the column of Bolivar are located is returning to the historical roots of our ancestors.".

— El Espectador

In the early 17th century a great part of the valley of Cúcuta belonged to Captain Christopher de Araque Ponce de Leon. The land passed through inheritance to his son Fernando Araque Ponce de Leon, who owned the entire territory from the Valley of Cúcuta to the village of San Jose, the jurisdiction of the city of San Faustino. These fields had been donated to the older Araque by the governor of the province of New Mérida on 9 September 1630.

The resistance of the Motilones indigenous group towards the whites who were taking over and controlling the valley with economic ambitions was the key factor in the request for the establishment of a Catholic parish with the name "San José." Juana Rangel de Cuéllar donated 782 hectares (1,930 acres) on June 17, 1733, for the construction of a church and land for Spanish families. Today, this area is the neighborhood of San Luis.

=== 19th century: Major events ===
==== Battle of Cúcuta ====
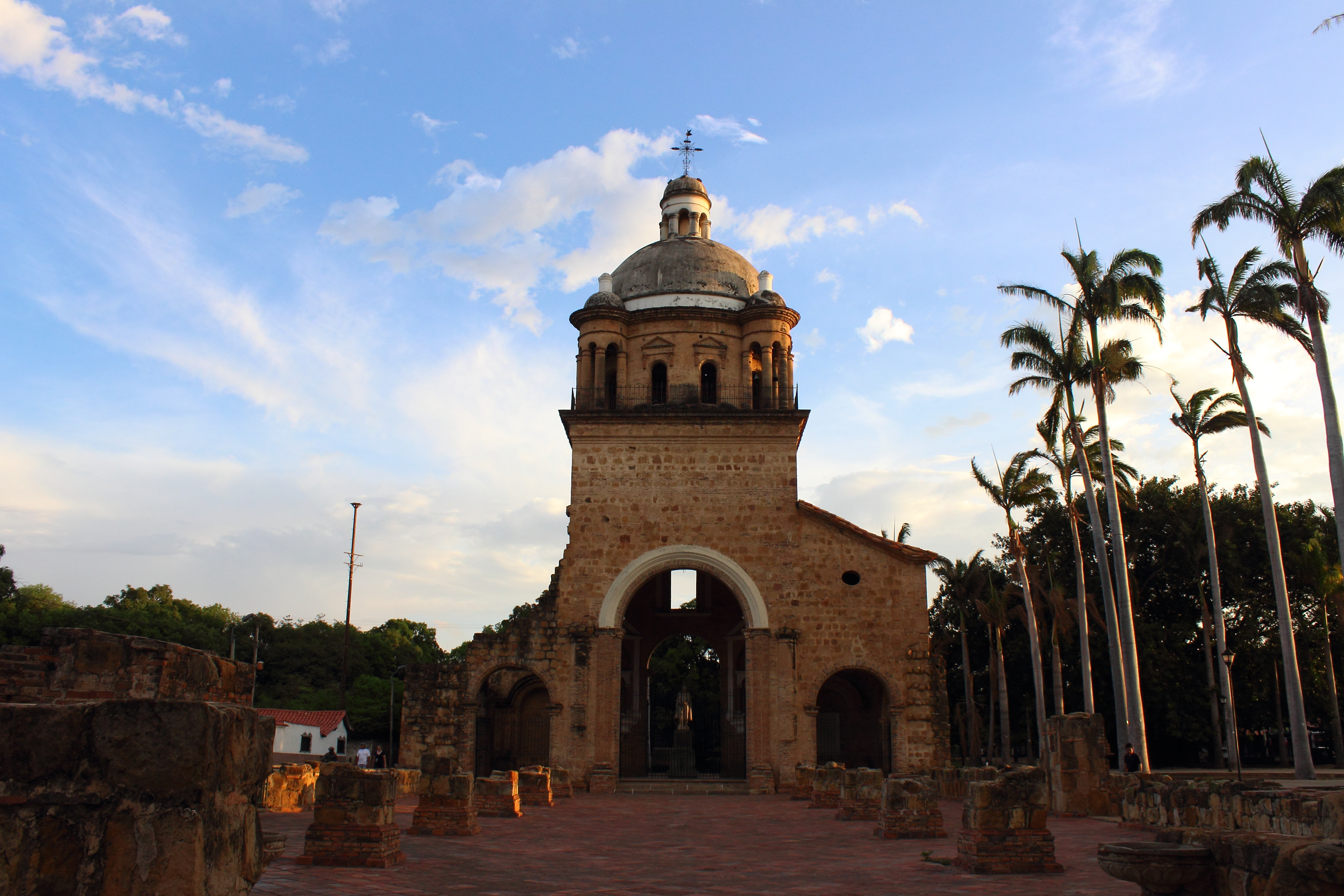
Temple of the Congress or Historic Temple, Villa del Rosario.

The Battle of Cúcuta was one of the most important events of the Spanish American wars of independence, due to its role in the independence of Colombia and Venezuela. This battle was the beginning of the Admirable Campaign of Simón Bolívar. On February 28, 1813, Bolivar captured the city after a battle that lasted from 9:00 a.m. until early afternoon. About 400 men led by Bolivar fought 800 troops led by the Spanish general Ramon Correa. Bolivar's forces reported losses of two killed and 14 injured, while the royalists are said to have suffered 20 killed and 40 injured. The victory freed the city of Cúcuta and led to the Admirable Campaign.

Colonel Simón Bolívar then launched a major offensive against the Spanish forces who were on the east bank of the Magdalena River and quickly achieved resounding victories. These led him to undertake a journey to liberate the Valley of Cúcuta held by the command of royalist Colonel Ramon Correa.

==== Congress of Cúcuta ====
On August 30, 1821, the Congress of Cúcuta took place at the town of Villa del Rosario (today part of Cúcuta) in the church known today as the "Historic Temple of Cúcuta". The congress was established by Antonio Nariño and its participants included Francisco de Paula Santander, Simón Bolívar, and other leaders of Spanish America's struggle for independence from Spain.

The main objective of this congress was to unify the territories of New Granada (Colombia and Panama) and Venezuela and thus create a huge state to be known as the Republic of Colombia (Gran Colombia). Ecuador subsequently joined Gran Colombia.

At 11 am on October 3, 1821, Simón Bolívar entered the meeting room in the sacristy of the church. He took a seat next to the president of Congress and was sworn in as president of the fledgling Republic of Colombia.

==== Earthquake of Cúcuta ====
On May 18, 1875, Cúcuta was largely destroyed by the earthquake of Cúcuta, also known as the "Earthquake of the Andes". The earthquake occurred at 11:15 am; it destroyed Villa del Rosario, San Antonio del Tachira and Capacho, seriously damaged the Venezuelan settlements of San Cristóbal, La Mulata, Rubio, Michelena, La Grita and Colón (among others), and was felt in Bogotá and Caracas.

==== Industrial Revolution ====
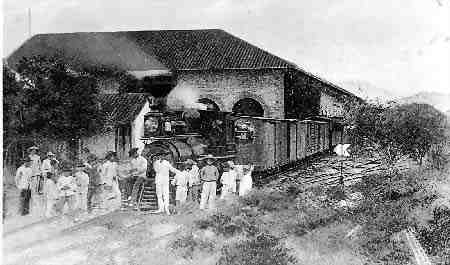
Railroad of Cúcuta – 1910

In the 19th century, the construction of a railroad set off an Industrial Revolution in the city. The railroad had four branches: North, East, South and West. The North branch was constructed from 1878 to 1888, and connected Cúcuta with Puerto Santander and Venezuela. Construction of the Eastern and Southern branches began in 1878; the South branch linked with Pamplona, Colombia, and ended in El Diamante. The West branch was not built owing to economic problems. The railroad company fell into bankruptcy and was closed in 1960.

Many of the city's historic buildings lie within the Park of Greater Colombia, including the House of Santander, the historic church, and the historic tamarind. All these are well preserved.

== Geography, climate and lay-out ==
=== Geography ===
The city is in the eastern part of the Department of North Santander, in the Cordillera Oriental, close to the border with Venezuela. The city's area is 110 square kilometres (42 square miles) and its elevation is 320 metres (1,050 feet) above sea level.

Rivers in Cúcuta and Norte de Santander include the Pamplonita River, Guaramito River, San Miguel River and Zulia River.

The Pamplonita River crosses the Norte de Santander Department.

Zones (Comunas)	Small towns (Corregimientos)	Settlements (Caseríos)
No. 1, Centro; No. 2, Centro Oriental; No. 3, Sur Oriental; No. 4, Oriental; No. 5, Nororiental; No. 6, Norte; No. 7, Noroccidental; No. 8, Occidental; No. 9, Suroccidental; No. 10, Cementerio	Aguaclara; Banco de Arena; La Buena Esperanza; El Soldado; Puerto Villamizar; Ricaurte; San Faustino; San Pedro; Guaramito; El Palmarito.	Arrayanes; Boconó; Alto Viento; El Carmen; El Pórtico; El Rodeo; La jarra; Puerto León; Puerto Nuevo.

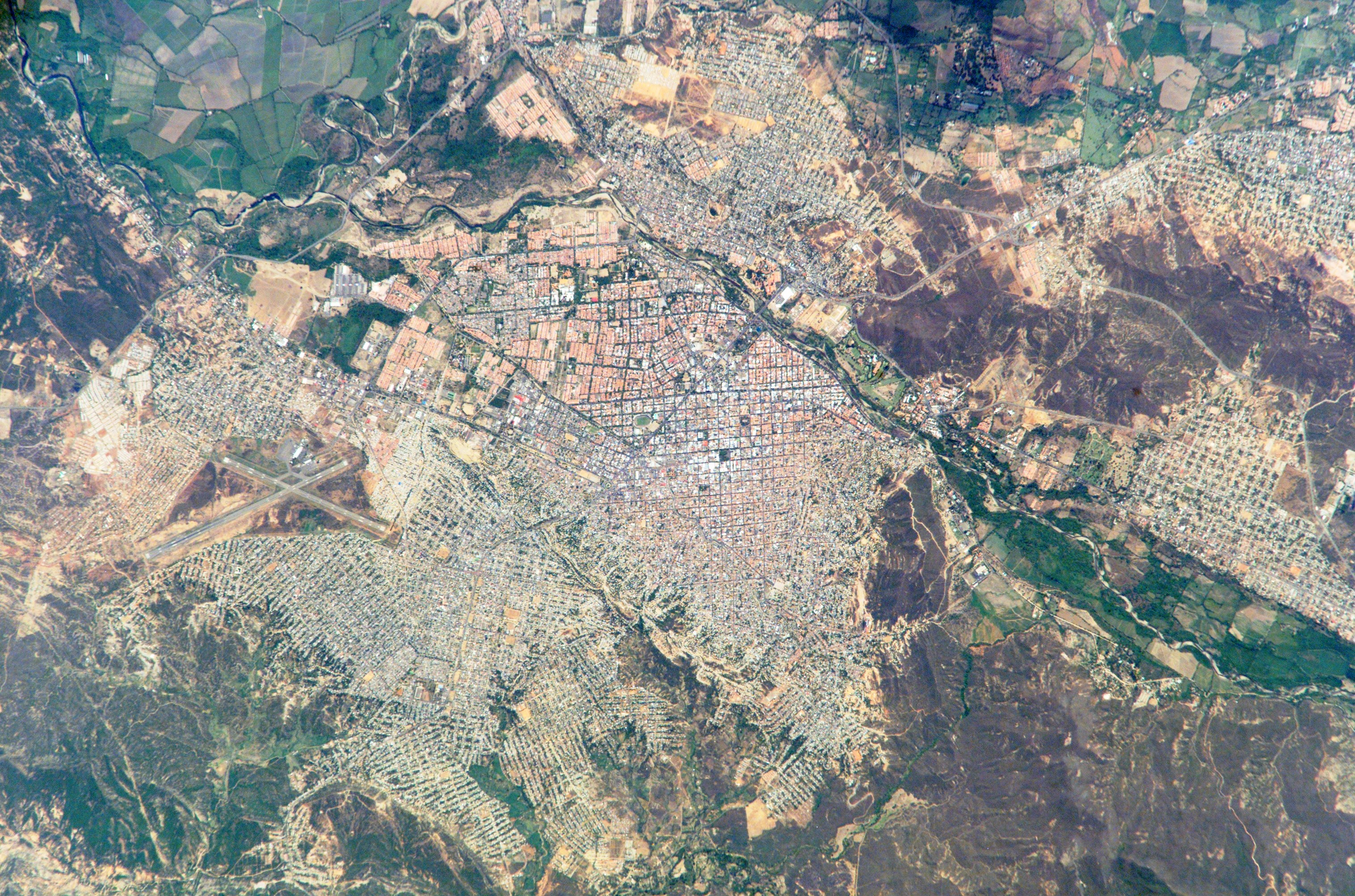
Maps of Cúcuta
Satellite map	Urban map

=== Climate ===
Cúcuta has a tropical savanna climate, bordering on a hot semi-arid climate (Köppen BSh). The mean temperature is 27.6 °C or 81.7 °F; afternoon maximum temperatures are around 32 °C or 89.6 °F. There is a sharp contrast between the wet season and the dry season. The driest months are January, February, June and July; the wettest are April, May, September, October and November. June and July usually however have frequent light precipitation and fog, whereas August is sunny and windy. The annual precipitation is around 900 millimetres or 35 inches. Higher elevations near the city have cooler and wetter climates.

Climate data for Cúcuta (Camilo Daza International Airport) 1991–2020
Month	Jan	Feb	Mar	Apr	May	Jun	Jul	Aug	Sep	Oct	Nov	Dec	Year
Record high °C (°F)	38.5 (101.3)	38.5 (101.3)	39.0 (102.2)	40.5 (104.9)	41.0 (105.8)	40.5 (104.9)	41.0 (105.8)	42.5 (108.5)	42.5 (108.5)	39.6 (103.3)	38.0 (100.4)	40.5 (104.9)	42.5 (108.5)
Mean daily maximum °C (°F)	30.4 (86.7)	30.8 (87.4)	31.1 (88.0)	31.7 (89.1)	32.9 (91.2)	33.1 (91.6)	33.3 (91.9)	34.2 (93.6)	34.4 (93.9)	33.0 (91.4)	31.3 (88.3)	30.3 (86.5)	32.2 (90.0)
Daily mean °C (°F)	25.9 (78.6)	26.4 (79.5)	26.7 (80.1)	27.2 (81.0)	27.9 (82.2)	28.2 (82.8)	28.2 (82.8)	28.7 (83.7)	28.7 (83.7)	27.7 (81.9)	26.6 (79.9)	26.0 (78.8)	27.4 (81.3)
Mean daily minimum °C (°F)	21.4 (70.5)	21.9 (71.4)	22.5 (72.5)	22.9 (73.2)	23.5 (74.3)	24.0 (75.2)	23.8 (74.8)	23.9 (75.0)	23.5 (74.3)	22.9 (73.2)	22.5 (72.5)	22.0 (71.6)	22.9 (73.2)
Record low °C (°F)	16.6 (61.9)	16.0 (60.8)	18.0 (64.4)	18.0 (64.4)	18.0 (64.4)	17.4 (63.3)	18.4 (65.1)	18.0 (64.4)	18.6 (65.5)	18.0 (64.4)	17.6 (63.7)	16.8 (62.2)	16.0 (60.8)
Average precipitation mm (inches)	63.9 (2.52)	46.1 (1.81)	65.9 (2.59)	102.7 (4.04)	85.1 (3.35)	42.5 (1.67)	38.3 (1.51)	45.7 (1.80)	60.7 (2.39)	119.1 (4.69)	143.8 (5.66)	83.5 (3.29)	897.4 (35.33)
Average precipitation days (≥ 1 mm)	5.0	4.6	6.2	8.3	8.2	8.6	8.3	6.6	7.0	10.5	9.8	6.4	89.4
Average relative humidity (%)	76	74	75	76	71	64	62	61	65	72	78	79	71
Mean monthly sunshine hours	201.5	169.5	151.9	144.0	179.8	180.0	204.6	217.0	201.0	195.3	189.0	195.3	2,228.9
Mean daily sunshine hours	6.5	6.0	4.9	4.8	5.8	6.0	6.6	7.0	6.7	6.3	6.3	6.3	6.1
Source: Instituto de Hidrologia Meteorologia y Estudios Ambientales (humidity, sun 1971-2010)

=== Layout ===
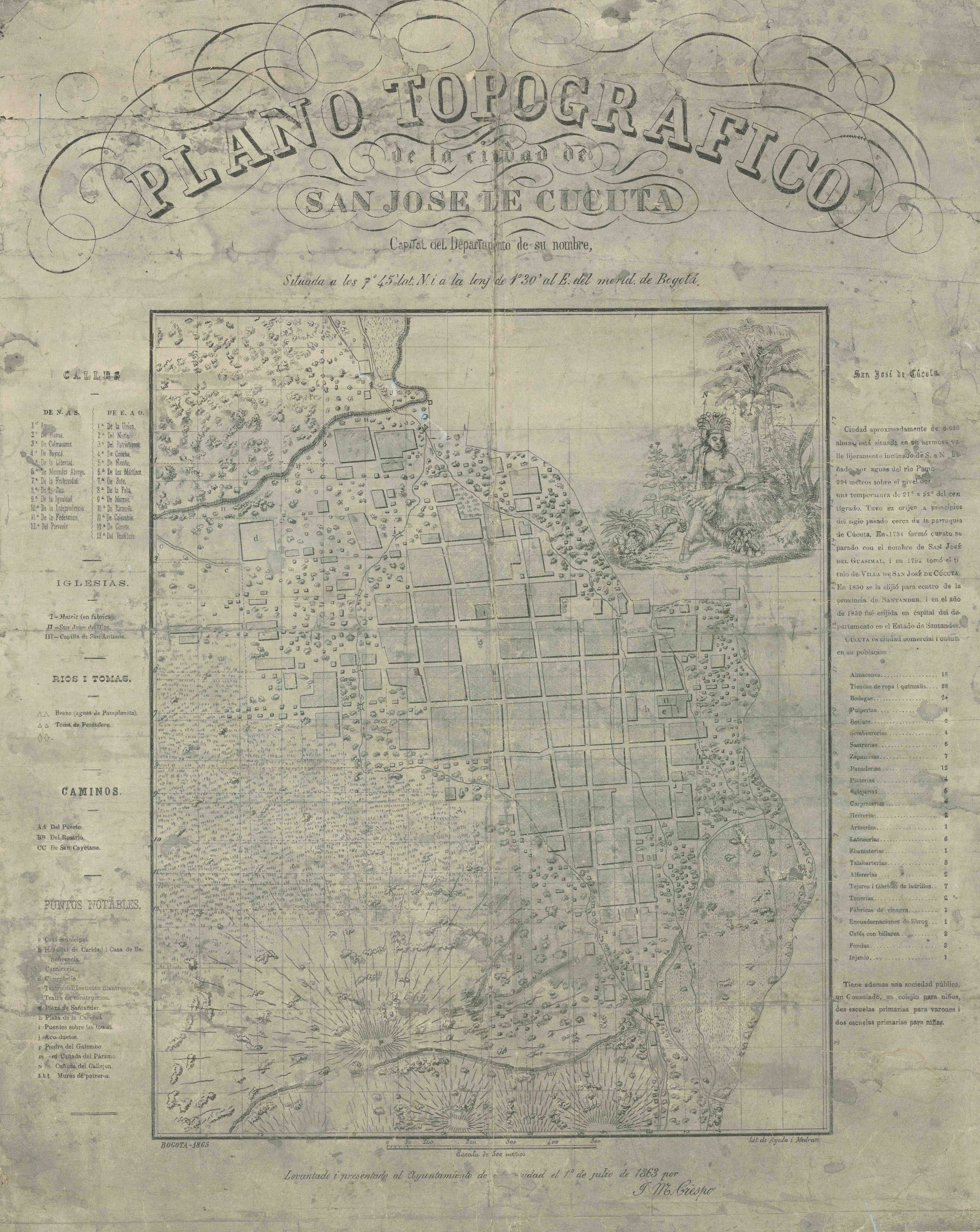
Topography of the old city (current center) before the earthquake. 1863.

Cúcuta's center, core of the city, is organized as a grid adopted from Spain in colonial times and reformed by Francisco Andrade Troconis after the devastating earthquake of 1875, with Santander Park as the guiding point. More than 300 neighborhoods form the urban network. Poorer neighborhoods are in the north, northwest, and southwest, many of them squatter areas. The middle-class lives mostly in the central and eastern areas.

==== Odonymy ====
Minor streets (Calles) run from east to west, perpendicular to the city's western hills, whose numbering increases from north to south, starting from 1st Street.

Major streets (avenidas), on the other hand, run from south to north parallel to the hills, starting from Zero Avenue. Avenues west of Zero Avenue increase their numbering from east to west, while those east of Zero Avenue increase their numbering from west to east, adding the indicative "E" (from Este, east) as well (for example, 1st Avenue E, 2nd Avenue E, etc.).

== Symbols ==
=== Flag ===
Flag of the city, including the coat of arms enforced by decree.

The red and black North Santander Department flag was exhibited for the first time in 1928, when the first National Olympics were held in Cali. However, the flag of Cúcuta was not legalized until Mayor Carlos A. Rangel issued Decree 106 on May 3, 1988.

The black section represents the rich resources hidden beneath the territory, as well as the potential capability of the local people, whereas the red section represents the sacrifices of the independence heroes and the perseverance of the people in charge of reconstructing the city.

=== Coat of arms ===
The coat of arms of Cúcuta was adopted on February 3, 1958, by Decree 032, after a request by the History Academy of North Santander. The shield is a classic shape, and carries the title conferred on the city by royal decree of King Charles IV: Very noble, valiant and loyal town of San José of Cúcuta.

The upper part depicts the arms of the city's founder, Juana Rangel of Cuéllar, who donated lands for the foundation of the city on June 17, 1733. There are five silver and red fleur-de-lis in the shape of reels on a golden background.

Coat of arms.

The lower part of the shield displays the arms that the National Congress adopted for Colombia by the Law of October 6, 1821, at its meeting in the Villa del Rosario. In the center are a quiver of spears, marked with X's, and a set of bow and arrows, tied with tricolor tape. The spears represent attributes of the Roman consuls; the X is a symbol of the right of life or death; the bow and arrows are symbols of the pre-Hispanic indigenous people.

=== Anthem ===
The anthem of Cúcuta was adopted by Decree 039 of February 8, 1984, under Mayor Luis Vicente Serrano Silva. The lyrics were written by Father Manuel Grillo Martínez, and the music by the master Pablo Tarazona Prada. It was chosen as the Anthem of Cúcuta by a unanimous vote in a contest held in the Theater Zulima.

== Demographics ==
=== Population ===
The metropolitan area, which includes the municipalities of Villa del Rosario, Los Patios, El Zulia, San Cayetano, and Puerto Santander, has a combined population of more than one million people. It is the largest metropolitan area in eastern Colombia and seventh in Colombia, behind Barranquilla, Bucaramanga, and Cartagena.

Population of Cúcuta

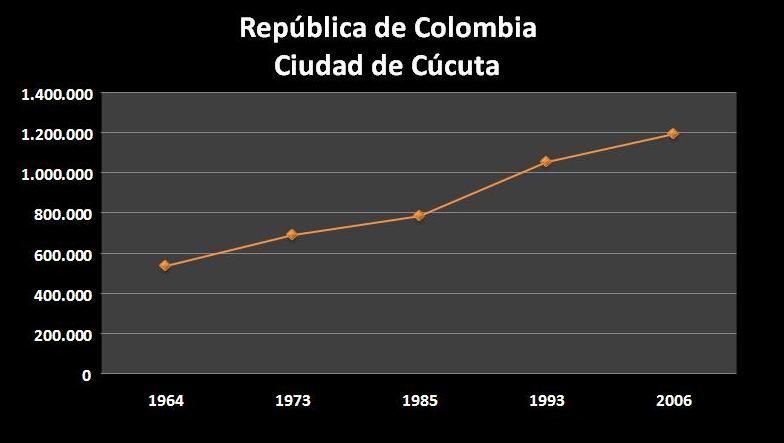
Population of Cúcuta 1964–2006

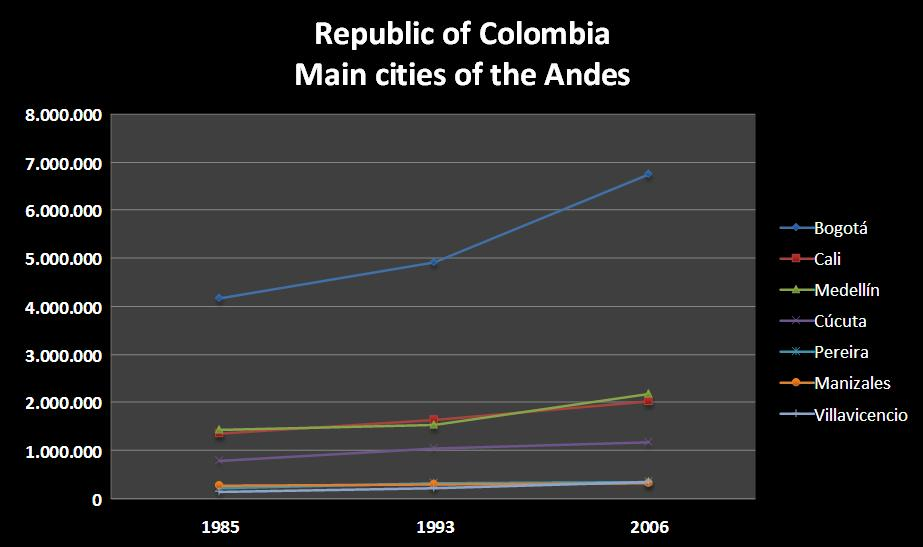
Population of main cities of the Andes

=== People ===
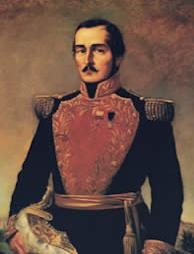
Francisco de Paula Santander

Many notable Colombians are from Cúcuta:

- James Rodríguez, footballer
- Francisco de Paula Santander, the first president of Colombia, known as "the man of the laws"
- Virgilio Barco, a former president of Colombia
- Fabiola Zuluaga, the most successful Colombian tennis player
- El reverendo padre Rafael García Herreros (the founder of Minuto de Dios)
- Elias M. Soto, a classical musician
- Marino Vargas Villalta, civic leader and businessman, who during the 1950s and 1960s was the chairperson of the popular local soccer team, Cúcuta Deportivo
- Alberto Villamizar, a former congressman and ambassador to Indonesia, Netherlands, and Cuba; Colombia's first "kidnappings czar"; and leading political figure of the nuevo liberalismo (New Liberalism) movement of Luis Carlos Galan
- Amaranta Hank, a Colombian politician and former pornographic film actress.

== Government ==
The current mayor of Cúcuta is Jorge Acevedo Peñaloza, who was elected for the 2024–2027 period with 89,759 votes.

The city is governed by the three branches of power: the executive power, represented by the mayor and its departments; the legislative power, represented by the city council; and the judicial power, which is formed by the tribunals and many other organisms of control. The mayor is elected for a 4-year period and oversees electing each head of the administration departments. The city council is formed by 19 representatives elected by popular vote for four years. They approve or reject each decree issued by the mayor and make or correct laws regarding the city.

As the capital of Norte de Santander Department, Cúcuta houses the Department Hall and the City hall of the Metropolitan Area of Cúcuta, along with the Francisco de Paula Santander Justice Palace.

The city is divided into 10 localities (comunas). The Metropolitan Area of Cúcuta is formed by Cúcuta (as the main city), Villa del Rosario, Los Patios, San Cayetano, El Zulia, and Puerto Santander.

Politics in Cúcuta are not defined by a single political movement. Past rivals included the Colombian Liberal Party and the Colombian Conservative Party. Today the political landscape is shared by many political parties, none commanding majority support.

== Economy ==
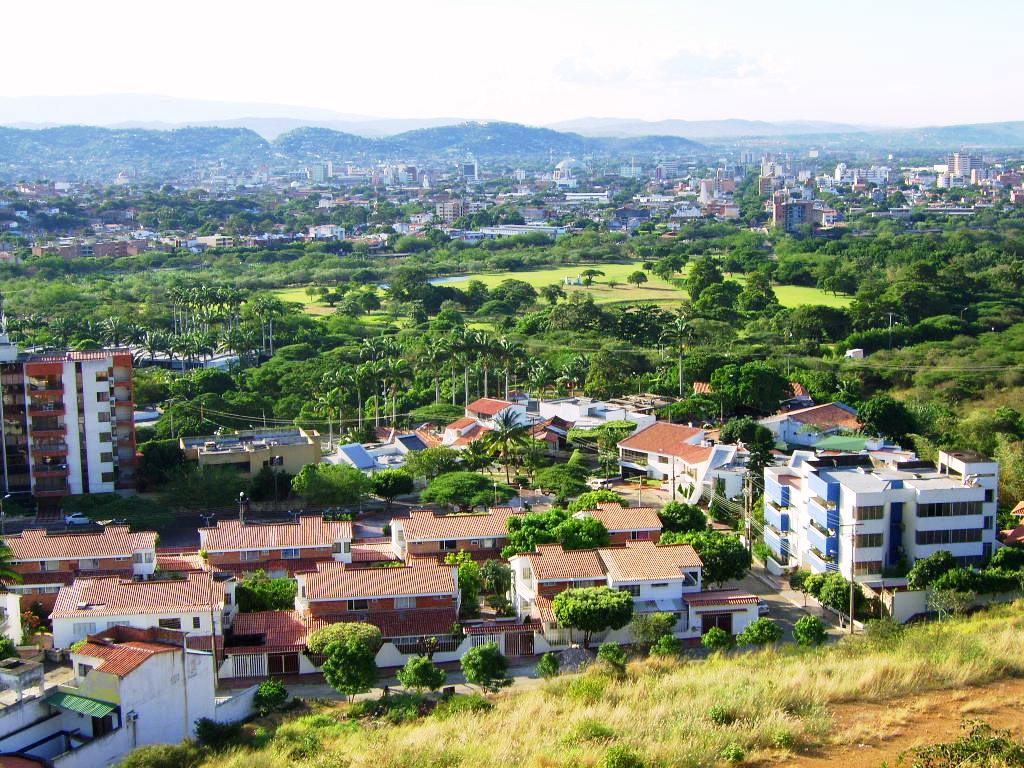
Photo of Cucuta (2006).

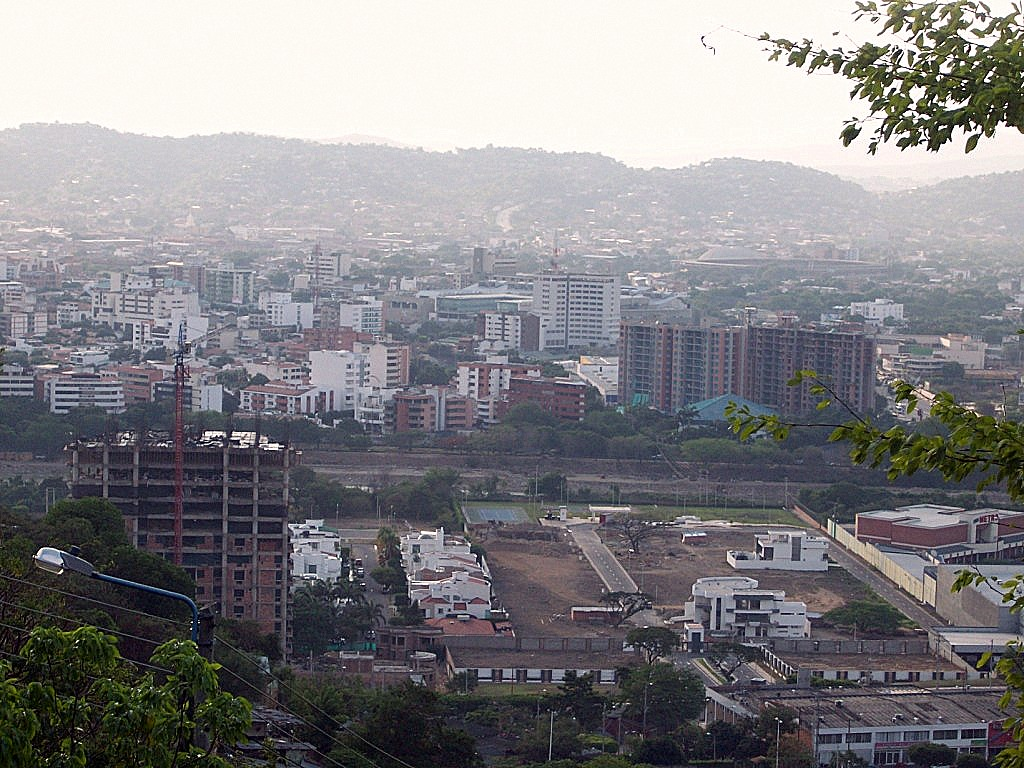
Housing construction in 2010. The entire city is experiencing great development.

The city's economy is based on bilateral trade and manufacturing. Its location on the border between Colombia and Venezuela has made possible strong links with the Venezuelan city of San Cristóbal, Táchira.

The city has a free-trade zone.

The most developed industries are dairy, construction, textiles, shoes, and leather. The city is a top producer of cement and its clay and stoneware industry has the best reputation nationally for its high quality. The mining of coal also plays an important role in the local economy. The University Francisco de Paula Santander in Cucuta, the National University of Colombia in Bogotá, and the Pedagogical and Technological University of Colombia in Tunja are the only ones in the country that provide for the career of Mining Engineering.

The peso is the official and sole legal tender currency in the city. Owing to its proximity to Venezuela, the bolívar was accepted by the vast majority of commercial establishments until the rapid devaluation of the Venezuelan currency began after the 2013 recession.

=== US–Colombia Free Trade Agreement, implications for Cúcuta ===
Colombia signed a free trade agreement with the United States over opposition from Venezuela. In the mid-2000s, some Venezuelan industries built facilities in Cúcuta to export their products to the United States registered as Colombian goods, a strategy that allowed them to export without paying certain tariffs.

Colombian law provides tax exemptions for Venezuelan imports through the Zona Franca, which, coupled with the motorway links between Cúcuta and Maracaibo, increases the possibility of exports from Maracaibo into Colombia.

== Telecommunications ==
The city's telecommunications services include payphones, WiMAX wireless networks, and mobile phone networks (GSM, CDMA, and TDMA).

Telecom Colombia offers the services of local, national, and international telephone and broadband ADSL Internet. There are three mobile telephone operators: Comcel, Movistar, and Tigo.

== Transport ==
For travel outside the city, there is a bus station called "Terminal de Transportes", the Camilo Daza International Airport (Colombia) and the Juan Vicente Gómez International Airport (Venezuela). Until 1960, the city was served by the Cúcuta railroad, which connected it with Venezuela.

The main forms of public transportation are buses (colectivos) and taxicabs. In addition, National Planning has a project to build a mass transit system, under the name "Metrobus" (Cúcuta).

The highway to Bucaramanga (renovated in January 2007) connects Cúcuta with Bogotá, Medellín, and Cali. The highway to Ocaña connects the city with Barranquilla, Cartagena, and Santa Marta, and the highway to San Cristóbal connects it with Caracas.

=== Bridges ===
The city has many bridges:

- San Rafael Bridge – the official name is "Benito Hernández Bustos".
- Francisco de Paula Andrade Troconis Bridge – the prolongation of Av. 0, connecting the city with the municipality of Los Patios.
- Elías M. Soto Bridge – rebuilt and extended to 6 rails.
- San Luís Bridge – imported from England.
- Rafael García Herreros Bridge – part of the East Anillo Vial.

== Health ==
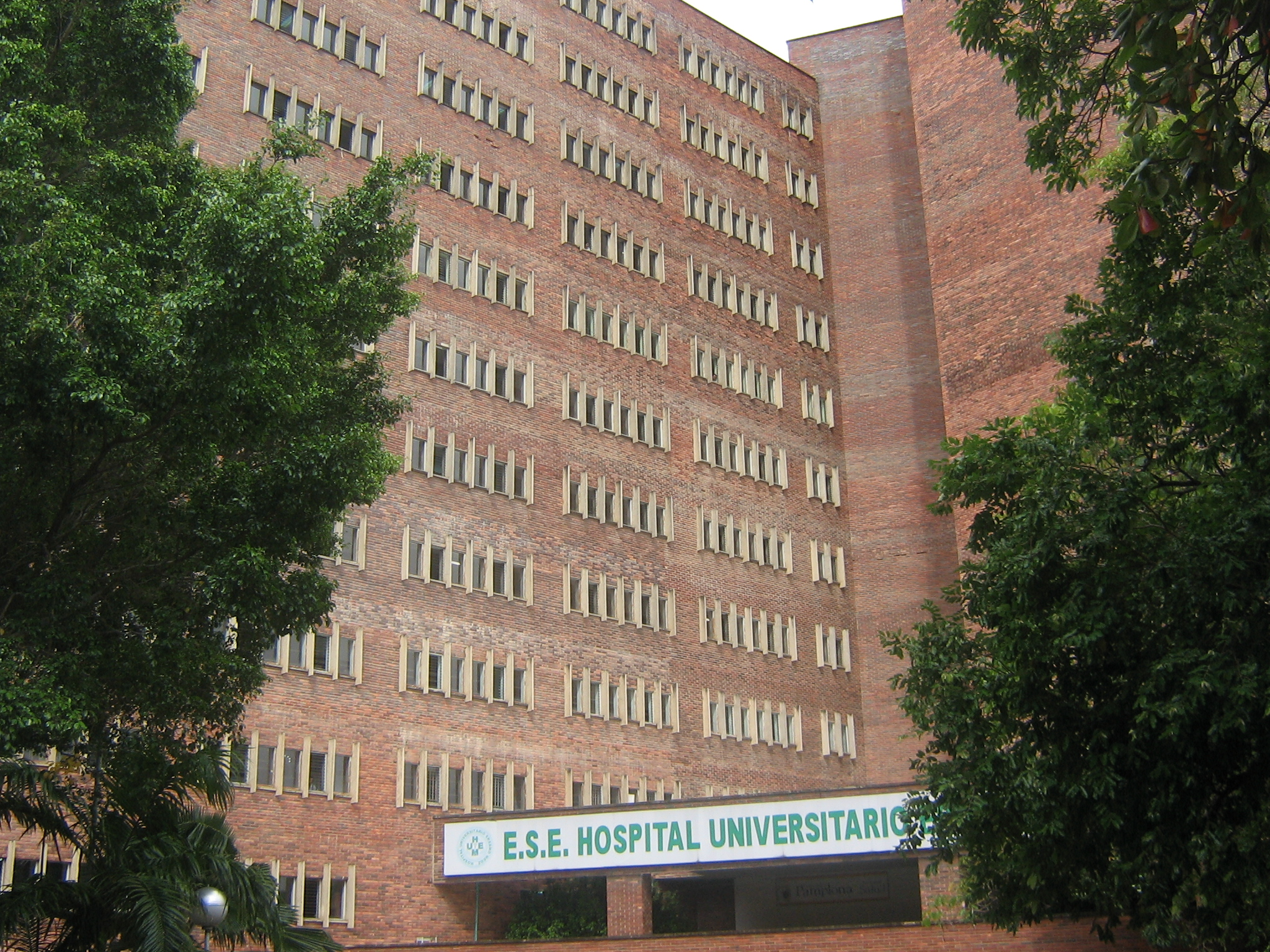
El Hospital Universitario Erasmo Meoz, main medical center of the city.

Law 100 of 1993 is the law governing Health in Colombia, which is regulated by the Ministry of Social Protection. In Cúcuta and North Santander, health is administered by the Municipal Institute of Health (IMSALUD) and the local Department of Health, respectively. Entities such as the Colombian Red Cross, Colombian Civil Defense (for emergencies, calamities, and natural disasters), and the Colombian Family Welfare Institute (ICBF), are part of the social protection system.

The city has the following public health institutions (or State Social Enterprises, ESE): the ESE Erasmo Meoz University Hospital, the ESE Francisco de Paula Santander (Clinical Social Security), the ESE CardioNeuroPulmonar Rehabilitation Center, the ESE Hospital of Los Patios, and ESE Hospital of Villa del Rosario. Private health centers include: San Jose Clinic, the North Clinic, Clinica Santa Ana, Lions Clinic, the Samaritan Clinic, and Profamilia (sexual and reproductive health).

The aforementioned entities are part of the network of institutions providing services to health attached to the Ministry of Health and the Ministry of Municipal Health Department. The Erasmo Meoz hospital is a fourth-level institution and specializes in performing highly complex surgeries, such as transplants and reimplantations. It also offers healthcare services in the different districts of the city. The city has numerous health-promoting entities (Entidades Promotoras de Salud, EPS), such as Colsanitas, SaludCoop, and Cafesalud.

== Education ==
Basic education and high school education are in Colombian "Calendar A" for schools (from February to November).

=== Schools ===
- Colegio María Reina
- Colegio Sagrados Corazones
- Colegio El Carmen Teresiano
- Colegio Santa Teresa
- Colegio San Jose de Calasanz
- Colegio Sagrado Corazón de Jesús
- Colegio Metropolitano de San José
- Colegio Instituto Técnico Nacional de Comercio
- Colegio Salesiano
- Colegio Hispanoamericano
- Colegio La Salle
- Colegio Comfaoriente
- Colegio Santo Angel de la Guarda
- Colegio Acoandes
- Colegio Gimnasio Los Almendros
- Colegio Gimnasio Domingo Savio
- Colegio Cardenal Sancha
- Colegio Instituto Tecnico Mercedes Abrego
- Instituto Bilingüe Londres
- Colegio Cooperativo San José de Peralta
- Colegio Andino Bilingüe
- Colegio Integrado Juan Atalaya
- Colegio INEM José Eusebio Caro
- Colegio Municipal
- Colegio María Concepción Loperena CASD
- Colegio San José de Cúcuta
- Colegio Ebenezer
- Instituto Adventista de Cúcuta - INAC
- Colegio Comfanorte
- Colegio Gimnasio El Bosque
- Colegio Gremios Unidos

=== Universities ===
State Universities

- Universidad Francisco de Paula Santander
- Universidad de Pamplona
- SENA
- Unidades Tecnológicas de Santander

Private Universities

- Universidad FESC
- Universidad Libre de Colombia
- Universidad de Santander
- Universidad Antonio Nariño
- Universidad Simón Bolivar

== Sports ==
Football is the most popular sport, although basketball, volleyball, and inline speed skating are also popular. Football club Cúcuta Deportivo is the main professional team of the city, and plays their local matches at the General Santander stadium. The team won their first championship in the 2006 season and reached the semi-finals of the 2007 Copa Libertadores, losing to Boca Juniors; since that year, only one other Colombian team has reached the semi-finals of the competition (Atlético Nacional from Medellín in 2016). Other professional teams in the city are the Norte de Santander basketball team and the futsal team Cúcuta Niza; both play locally at the Coliseo Toto Hernández.

The city hosted the XIX National Games of Colombia in 2012, which helped to modernize many of the sports venues, like the Coliseo Toto Hernández. The Colombian Football Federation announced that Cúcuta will be one of the venue cities to host the 2016 FIFA Futsal World Cup, an event that is celebrated every four years.

== Recent development ==
In the late 2000s and early 2010s, the city underwent rapid development, including the construction of six overpasses, a convention center, a new bus terminal, and a new mass transportation system called "Metrobus", along with the modernization of state-owned schools, the renewal of downtown, and the doubling of the capacity of the General Santander Stadium.

At the time, new industries were also expected to come from Venezuela and place their factories in Cúcuta to export through the Colombia Trade Promotion Agreement between Colombia and the United States.

== Landscape ==
=== Monuments ===
The main monuments in the city are:

- The monument of the Battle of Cúcuta
- The monument of Juana Rangel de Cuellar, the founder of Cúcuta
- The monument of Camilo Daza at the Camilo Daza International Airport.

=== Parks ===
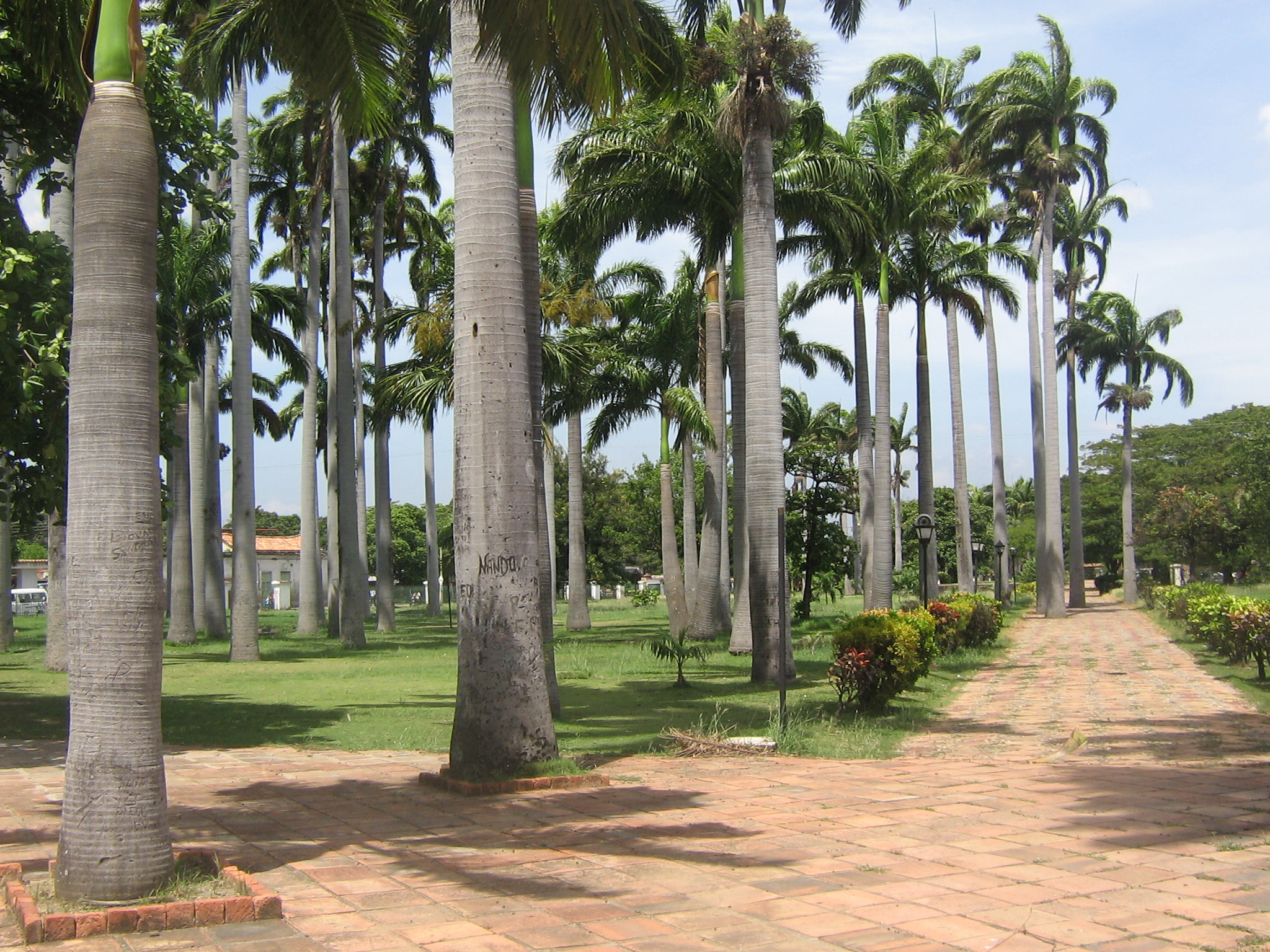
Park of the Greater Colombia

The main parks in the city are:

- Santander Park (in Spanish, Parque Santander), the main park of the city located in front of the city hall.
- Colón Park (in Spanish, Parque Colón), constructed in honor of Christopher Columbus (in Spanish, Cristobal Colón).
- Simón Bolivar Park (in Spanish, Parque Simón Bolivar), constructed in honor of Simón Bolivar and donated by the Consulate of Venezuela in Cúcuta.

=== Greenery ===
Cúcuta has more green zones than many cities in Colombia. Some consider the city an urban lung, due to its greenery and lack of pollution. The city's greenery dates to its reconstruction after the 1875 earthquake, directed by engineer Francisco de Paula Andrade Troconis. The first planted trees were clemones. Soon they were replaced by acacias, peracos, and almond trees that adorned the parks and roadsides. An example of this city design is the Avenue of the Lights (based on oití, ficus, and cují), which forms a natural tunnel admired in the rest of the country and by tourists.

Palm trees are common in places such as Santander Park, Great Colombian Park, the Bank of the Republic, and the Department Hall of Norte de Santander.

== Heritage sites ==
Cúcuta has several important cultural sites such as the birthplace of Eduardo Cote Lamus, an influential person in the politics of Norte de Santander and the country during the first half of the twentieth century, this building was built in 1877. Another historical site of Cúcuta is the Casa Torre de Reloj, which served at the beginning as the Compañía Eléctrica del Norte (lit. 'Electric Company of the North'), and later as the House of Culture in addition to office of the Department's Secretary of Culture. Another historic site is the Palacio de la Cúpula Chata, which is a building dating from 1919, part of the dome was shipped from New York City in June 1915. In 1989, part of the building was damaged by a fire, so in 1990, the project of reconstruction of the building was started based on the project of Maria Teresa Vela Viccini.

== International relations ==
=== Twin towns – sister cities ===
- Zaragoza, Spain
