= FESC =

FESC may refer to:

- Fellow of the European Society of Cardiology, title awarded by the European Society of Cardiology to healthcare professionals
- Fundación de Estudios Superiores Comfanorte, Colombian university in the city of Cúcuta, Norte de Santander
