= List of cities in Colombia by population =

This article lists cities in Colombia by population, according to the 2018 Colombian census, with 2025 projections (Note: A "2025 projection" is the population projected for a city in 2025 as estimated by the 2018 census.) by the National Administrative Department of Statistics (DANE). All cities listed have a population of at least 100,000 residents.

== List ==
No.	City	Department	2018 census	2025 projection
1	Bogotá	Capital District	7,412,566	7,937,898
2	Medellín	Antioquia	2,427,129	2,634,570
3	Cali	Valle del Cauca	2,227,642	2,285,099
4	Barranquilla	Atlántico	1,206,319	1,342,818
5	Cartagena	Bolívar	973,045	1,065,881
6	Cúcuta	Norte de Santander	711,715	815,891
7	Soacha	Cundinamarca	660,179	828,947
8	Soledad	Atlántico	603,999	686,339
9	Bucaramanga	Santander	581,130	623,881
10	Villavicencio	Meta	531,275	593,273
11	Ibagué	Tolima	529,635	546,003
12	Bello	Antioquia	522,264	570,329
13	Santa Marta	Magdalena	499,192	566,650
14	Montería	Córdoba	490,935	531,424
15	Valledupar	Cesar	490,075	575,225
16	Pereira	Risaralda	467,269	482,824
17	Manizales	Caldas	434,403	459,262
18	Pasto	Nariño	392,930	415,937
19	Neiva	Huila	357,392	388,229
20	Palmira	Valle del Cauca	349,294	359,888
21	Popayán	Cauca	318,059	346,403
22	Buenaventura	Valle del Cauca	308,188	324,644
23	Armenia	Quindío	295,208	310,817
24	Floridablanca	Santander	291,935	342,373
25	Sincelejo	Sucre	277,773	317,629
26	Itagüí	Antioquia	276,744	301,428
27	Tumaco	Nariño	253,637	268,311
28	Envigado	Antioquia	228,848	250,012
29	Dosquebradas	Risaralda	217,178	226,152
30	Tuluá	Valle del Cauca	212,685	233,385
31	Barrancabermeja	Santander	203,537	217,742
32	Riohacha	La Guajira	188,014	230,407
33	Tunja	Boyacá	172,548	188,945
34	Piedecuesta	Santander	170,625	193,440
35	Maicao	La Guajira	170,582	206,963
36	Yopal	Casanare	168,433	196,758
37	Florencia	Caquetá	168,346	180,323
38	Uribia	La Guajira	163,462	198,368
39	San Juan de Girón	Santander	160,403	176,745
40	Jamundí	Valle del Cauca	159,877	181,942
41	Facatativá	Cundinamarca	139,441	177,093
42	Fusagasugá	Cundinamarca	138,498	175,589
43	Cartago	Valle del Cauca	135,729	143,522
44	Rionegro	Antioquia	135,465	147,907
45	Magangué	Bolívar	133,270	147,190
46	Chía	Cundinamarca	132,181	168,167
47	Zipaquirá	Cundinamarca	130,537	165,473
48	Mosquera	Cundinamarca	130,221	159,527
49	Quibdó	Chocó	129,237	146,875
50	Malambo	Atlántico	128,203	144,883
51	Buga	Valle del Cauca	127,545	133,907
52	Sogamoso	Boyacá	127,235	139,021
53	Turbo	Antioquia	124,552	135,464
54	Pitalito	Huila	124,359	137,170
55	Duitama	Boyacá	122,436	134,091
56	Apartadó	Antioquia	121,003	132,328
57	Ciénaga	Magdalena	120,071	134,841
58	Ocaña	Norte de Santander	118,273	135,990
59	Ipiales	Nariño	116,136	122,161
60	Lorica	Córdoba	113,909	119,228
61	Madrid	Cundinamarca	112,254	143,167
62	Santander de Quilichao	Cauca	110,445	119,121
63	Aguachica	Cesar	109,621	130,258
64	Sahagún	Córdoba	107,636	116,988
65	Yumbo	Valle del Cauca	107,334	108,895
66	Cereté	Córdoba	105,815	115,013
67	Turbaco	Bolívar	105,166	116,223
68	Villa del Rosario	Norte de Santander	101,952	116,757
69	Girardot	Cundinamarca	101,018	127,078

=== Places projected to reach a population above 100,000 by 2025 in the 2018 census ===
City	Department	2018 census	2025 projection
Tierralta	Córdoba	92,349	100,610
Los Patios	Norte de Santander	89,091	104,287
Arauca	Arauca	85,585	101,658
Cajicá	Cundinamarca	82,244	104,598
Sabanalarga	Atlántico	32,334	104,983

== See also ==
- List of cities and towns in Colombia, a list that includes cities and small towns in Colombia by alphabetical order
