= Congress of Cúcuta =

Constituent assembly that created Gran Colombia

Congress of Cúcuta Primer Congreso General de Colombia First General Congress of Colombia

Type
- Type: Constituent assembly of Gran Colombia

History
- Founded: 6 May 1821
- Disbanded: 14 October 1821
- Preceded by: Congress of Angostura (1819); Bogotá Assembly of Notables (1820)
- Succeeded by: First Constitutional Congress of Colombia (1823)

Leadership
- Installed by: Antonio Nariño; 6 May 1821
- First President of Congress: José Félix Restrepo since 6 May 1821
- First Vice President of Congress: Fernando Peñalver; 6–22 May 1821
- Secretaries: Francisco Soto and Miguel Santamaría

Structure
- Seats: 71 deputies participated during the congress
- Committees: Constitution and Legislation; Finance; Military Affairs; Powers and Petitions; National Credit; Public Education
- Authority: Viceroyalty of New Granada and Captaincy General of Venezuela
- New Granadan: 43 deputies
- Venezuelan: 27 deputies
- Mexican: 1 deputies

Elections
- Voting system: Indirect two-stage elections with property and status qualifications
- First election: 1820–1821

Meeting place
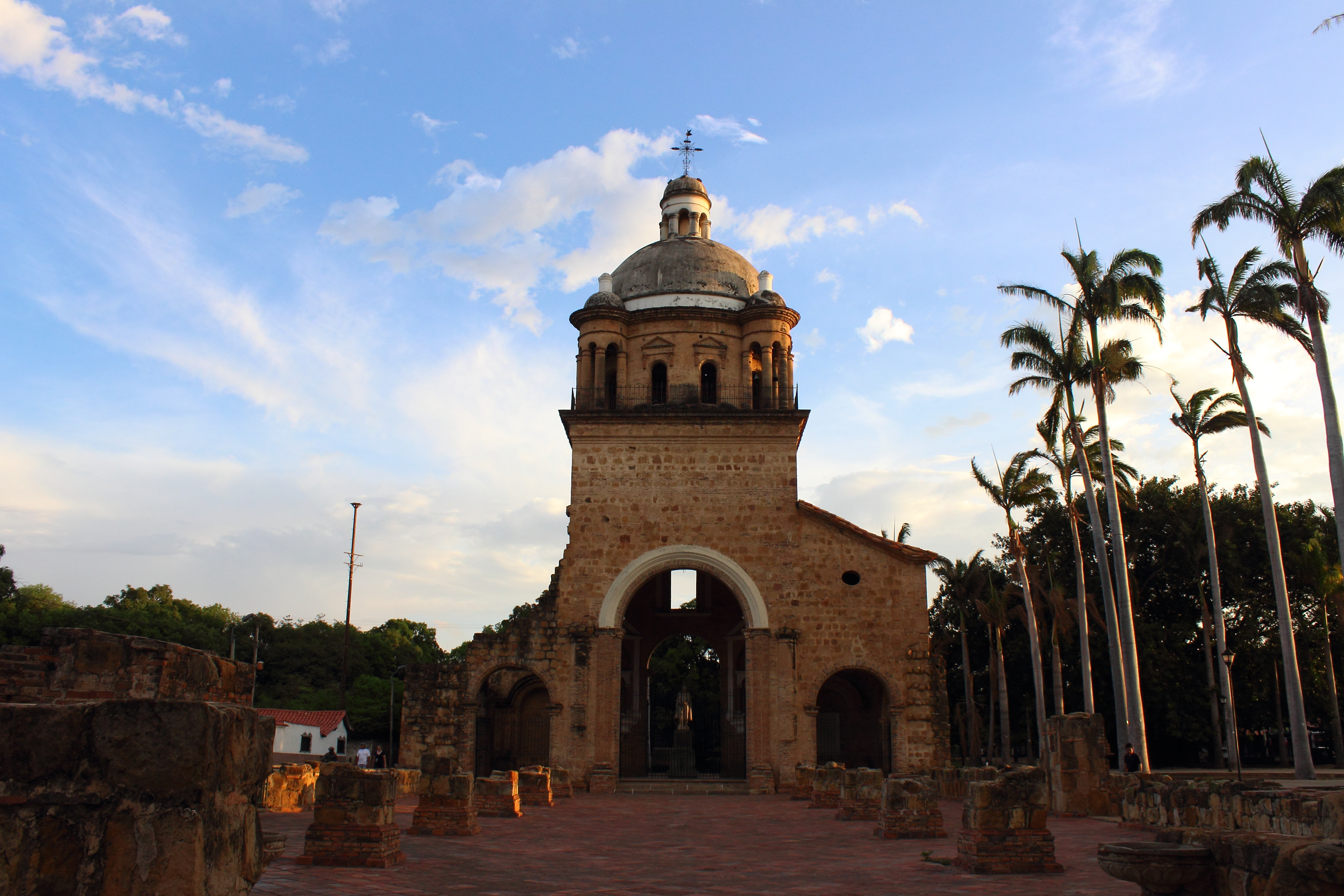
- Parish church of Villa del Rosario de Cúcuta, Republic of Colombia

Constitution
- Constitution of the Republic of Colombia (1821)

Rules
- (44 articles)

Footnotes
- Elected; Simón Bolívar as First President of Colombia (50-7 votes); Francisco de Paula Santander as First Vice President of Colombia (38-19 votes)

The Congress of Cúcuta, formally known as the General Congress of Colombia was a constituent assembly held at Villa del Rosario de Cúcuta, New Granada 1821. It brought deputies of New Granada and Venezuela to ratify the union of both countries, where the Republic of Colombia (historiographically called Gran Colombia) was established and organized. The Congress was installed by Antonio Nariño, convened from May 6th till October 14th in 1821 and elected Simón Bolívar and Francisco de Paula Santander president and vice-president, respectively.

The Cúcuta congress confirmed the political union of New Granada and Venezuela first proclaimed at the Congress of Angostura in 1819 and reaffirmed with reservations and changes at the assembly-junta of the principal elites, civil, military, judicial, municipal and ecclesiastical authorities in Bogotá in 1820, and created the Constitutional organization of the Republic of Colombia.

== History ==
The origins of the congress of Cúcuta lay in the political reorganization of the new patriot territories during the final phase of the spanish american wars of Independence, more specifically from the political and military reconstruction of the republican government in New Granada following the spanish reconquest of 1815-1816 where the united provinces collapse and the viceroyalty is restored under royal authority of Pablo Morillo. By the end of 1816 Morillo eliminated most of the republican government leaders in Santafé that had operated in the territory since the year 1810. The republican resistance left survived in different peripheral regions, including Casanare, the only New Granadan province later present in the Congress of Angostura.

Casanare was one of had become a major organized new granadan republican resistance that later held one of the majors armies that crossed the Andes mountains during Bolívar's campaign to liberate New Granada in 1819.

Around the same time, a totally separate republican government continued to operate in Venezuela under Simón Bolívar. Starting 1819 the Congress of Angostura was installed as the second national congress of Venezuela.Most of New Granada could not participate because most of the provinces remained under royalists control.

Casanare, however, was eventually represented. In July 1819, the New Granadan province sent a couple of deputies to Angostura, including José María Vergara Lozano, grandson of the Marquis of San Jorge, Vicente Uribe, and Francisco Antonio Zea, a new granadan who had already been selected as representative for Caracas.

== Creation and achievements of the Congress ==
Cúcuta was the birthplace of Simón Bolívar's dream of uniting South America in one single federal state, and of the principles upon which the political institutions of South America would replace those inherited from the 300 years of Spanish history.

Prior to 1819, Simón Bolívar, as well as others who facilitated the revolutionary establishment of the Venezuelan Republic, referred to all of South America as Colombia. Since then, Bolívar had proposed the union of what is today Venezuela, Colombia and Ecuador in a nation by the same name. Since Bolívar based the borders of the proposed nation on the principle of uti possidetis, Panama and Ecuador were included, despite having no representation at this Congress or the one in Angostura, since they had been part of the old Viceroyalty of New Granada. At the Congress of Angostura in 1819 the word "Colombia" was, therefore, used to describe this new country, when it was proposed. The cities of Bogotá, Caracas, and Quito were designated regional capitals within the new nation. Most of the territory of this Gran Colombia, with the exceptions of southern Colombia and Ecuador, was largely independent from Spain at the time the Congress of Cúcuta began holding sessions.

Places that were related to the Congress of Cúcuta, together with the House of Santander (Casa de Santander), are now protected due to historic significance, and form part of the Park of the Great Colombia.

=== Bolívar's appearance before the Congress ===
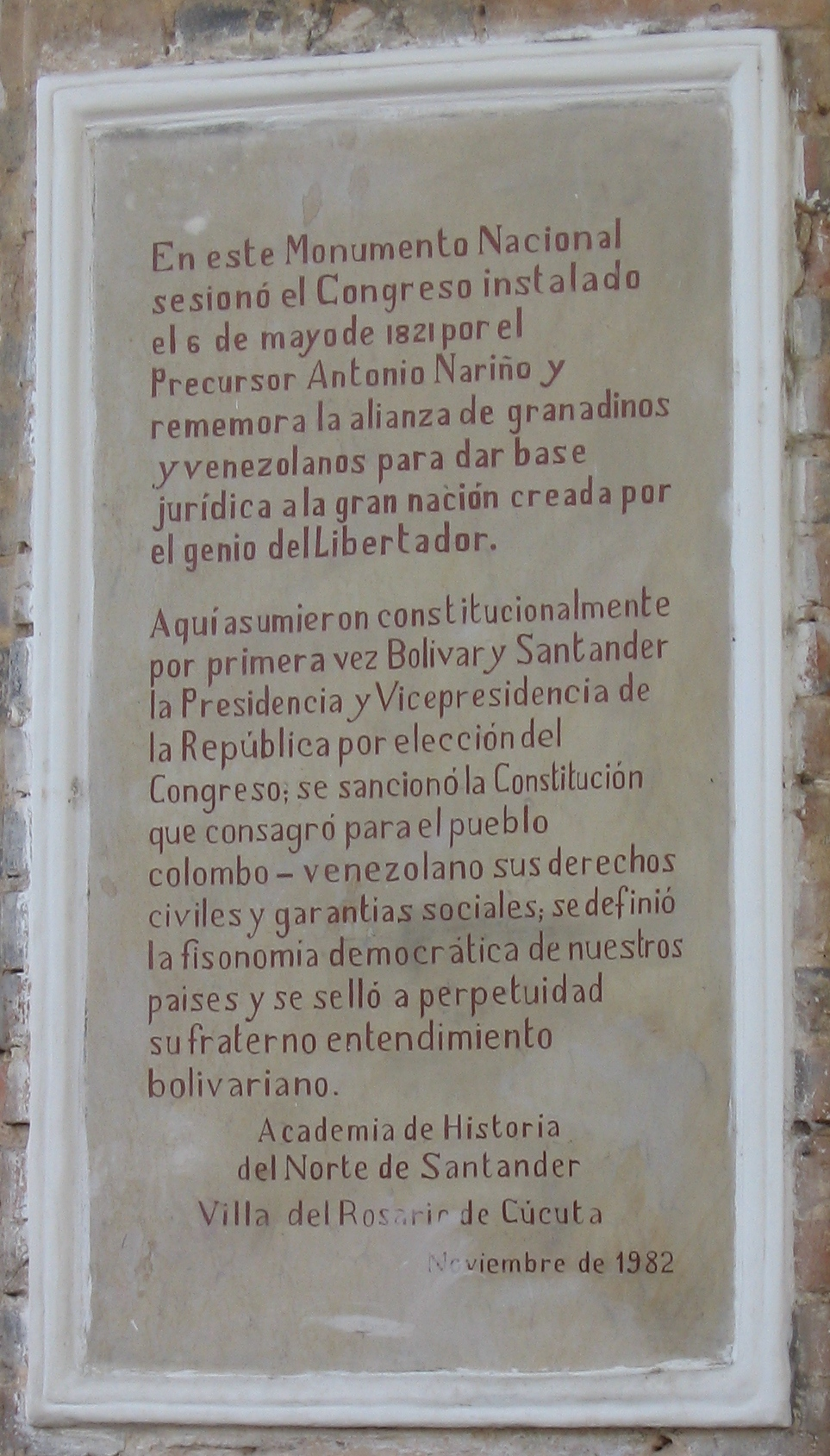
Commemoration of the Constitution of Cúcuta, which was the result of the Congress of Cúcuta.

The culminating event of the Congress of Cúcuta took place on August 30, 1821, in the city of Cúcuta. A constitution had been written which established the law of the Republic of Colombia (Gran Colombia), and determined the country's capital and political boundaries. The convention, organized by Antonio Nariño and led by Simón Bolívar.

At 11 o'clock on the morning of October 3, 1821 Simón Bolívar entered the debating chamber of the Congress of Cúcuta, located at the time in the sacristy of the parish church of the town of Villa del Rosario de Cúcuta (the old name for the town). He was accompanied by a commission of deputies and the members of the joint chiefs of staff of his armed forces. He sat beside the speaker of the assembly and, whilst the entire assembly stood, was sworn in as the President of the nascent Republic of Colombia, composed of Venezuela and Cundinamarca, the republican name by which New Granada was by then known. After a speech, and the naming of Santander as Vice-President, the text of the Constitution of the new republic was read out.

== See also ==
- House of Santander
- Historic church of Cúcuta
- Park of Gran Colombia
- Cúcuta
- Villa del Rosario
- 1875 Cúcuta earthquake

== Bibliography ==
- Bushnell, David (1970). The Santander Regime in Gran Colombia. Westport: Greenwood Press. ISBN 0-8371-2981-8
- Gibson, William Marion (1948). The Constitutions of Colombia. Durham: Duke University Press.
