= Francisco de Paula Santander University =

University in Colombia

- Universidad Francisco de Paula Santander
- Other names: UFPS
- Motto: Fortalecimiento Académico
- Type: Public
- Established: July 5, 1962
- Rector: Héctor Miguel Parra López
- Undergraduates: 12,523
- Postgraduates: 2,000
- Location: Cúcuta, Norte de Santander, Colombia
- Campus: Urban, 5 hectares (12 acres)
- Colors: Red & white
- Website: www.ufps.edu.co

The Francisco de Paula Santander University (Spanish: Universidad Francisco de Paula Santander) is a public, coeducational, research university based primarily in the city of Cúcuta, Colombia, with regional campuses in Ocaña, Colombia, Chinacota and Tibú.

It is the largest university in the state with more than 25,000 students. It offers 50 academic programmes, including 37 undergraduate degrees and 13 graduate degrees.

== History ==
The university was founded on July 5, 1962, and was later accredited by decree #37 (1964) and decree #323 (1970).

The Francisco de Paula Santander University is an autonomous university with administrative and financial autonomy, working under the Ministry of National Education.

== Location ==
Its main campus is located in Cúcuta. It also has branches in the city of Ocaña and the municipality of Chinacota. Additionally, it possesses several regional open education centers in municipalities of the departments of Norte de Santander, Cundinamarca, Santander, Cesar, Sucre, Bolívar, Magdalena, Arauca, and San Andrés y Providencia.

== Academics ==
=== College of Engineering ===
- Electromechanical
- Civil
- Mechanical
- Industrial
- Computer Systems
- Electronics
- Mining
- Industrial
- Civil Work Technology
- Chemical Technology

=== Facultad de Educación, Artes y Humanidades ===
- Law
- Communication and Journalism
- Social Work
- Architecture
- Maths
- Natural and Environmental Science

=== College of Management Sciences ===
- Business Administration
- Public Accounting

=== College of Health Sciences ===
- Bachelors of Science Nursing
- Occupational Health and Safety
- Pharmacy Administration

Graduate programs:

- Health Administration and Audit Graduate Certificate
- Occupational Health and Safety Graduate Certificate

=== College of Agriculture ===
- Biotechnological Engineering
- Agricultural Engineering
- Livestock and Animal Engineering
- Agro-industrial Production Engineering
- Farming Technology
