= Elías M. Soto =

- Born: Elias Mauricio Soto; 22 September 1858; Cúcuta, Granadine Confederation
- Died: 11 October 1944 (aged 86) Cúcuta, Colombia
- Occupation: Instrumentalist
- Instruments: Siren, bugle, trombón, tuba, piano, guitar, organ

Elías Mauricio Soto Uribe (September 22, 1858, Cúcuta, Granadine Confederation – October 11, 1944, Cúcuta, Colombia) was a Colombian musician and composer.

He played siren, bugle, trombone, tuba, piano, guitar, and organ in several bands. He was also the director of the Departmental Band of Norte de Santander in Cúcuta.

One of his notable works is the bambuco song "Brisas del Pamplonita" (lit. 'Breezes of the Pamplonita') composed for Elisa Ramirez, whom he would eventually marry. Oriol Rangel included it for its degree of pianist in the National Conservatory.
