= Biofilo Panclasta =

Colombian anarchist writer (1879–1943)

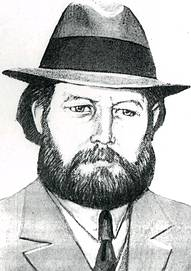
Biófilo Panclasta

Vicente Rojas Lizcano (October 26, 1879, in Chinácota, Colombia – March 1, 1943, in Pamplona, Colombia), known as Biófilo Panclasta, was a political activist, writer, and Colombian individualist anarchist. In 1904 he began to use the pseudonym by which he was later known: Biófilo, lover of life, and Panclasta, enemy of all. He traveled to more than fifty countries, agitating for anarchist ideas and taking part in worker and union demonstrations, in the course of which he befriended such people as Kropotkin, Maxim Gorky, and Lenin.

== Biography ==
=== Early life ===
The son of Bernardo Rojas and Simona Lizcano, a working-class woman, Biófilo began his studies in Pamplona, a city close to Chinácota. From 1897 to 1898 he was in the Escuela Normal of Bucaramanga, from which he was expelled for publishing a small periodical in which he denounced the re-election of president Miguel Antonio Caro.

=== Participation in the Venezuelan Revolution ===
In 1899 he left school and traveled to Venezuela, where, with Eleazar López Contreras, he founded the first Public School in the town of Capacho Nuevo, the capital of the Independencia municipality (State of Táchira). That same year he signs up for the army of the Venezuelan Cipriano Castro, which had as its goal the downfall of president Ignacio Andrade. He soon left this group behind and wandered around Venezuela with other revolutionary groups that prowled through Trujillo, Portuguesa, Cojedes and Carabobo. He arrived at the city of Valencia in January 1900. In November 1904 he traveled to the Colombian city of Barranquilla, now as a colonel in the army of Cipriano Castro; he offered his support as a fighter to the Colombian forces against the Panamanian separatists supported by the United States.

=== First contacts with Anarchism ===
In 1906 he traveled to Buenos Aires, Argentina. There his contact with anarchist and socialist thought began as he attended meetings and wrote for partisan newspapers. That same year, he left for Europe as a delegate of the Federación Obrera Regional Argentina to the Workers' Congress in Amsterdam.

=== Revolutionary Activity in Colombia ===
In 1908 he was exiled from Spain at the request of the Colombian president, Rafael Reyes. He arrived in Puerto Colombia with the plan of continuing to Bogotá; however, he chose to travel again and take refugue in Panama, from which he was once again exiled by order of Rafael Reyes. He was imprisoned and turned over to Colombian authorities.

=== Return to Venezuela: Valencia Prison ===
"The prisoners who had seen me enter into the cell were careful, in their entrance, not to trip over my cold, weak body. One of them felt with his hand my flesh, which did not shudder because I had already suffered all pain, and observing that I neither moved nor spoke, exclaimed sadly and softly, 'They hung this one in the Police Station and brought him to die here.'"

=== Revolutionary activity around the world ===
In 1923, two years after leaving the Valencia prison, Biófilo was selected as delegate of the Mexican Anarchist Association to a congress in Barcelona. There he proposed a project named Operation Europe, which had as its goal:

... the formation of an international committee charged with ordering, planning and executing in a single day the assassination of the Czar of Bulgaria, the King of England, the King of Italy, the King of Egypt, the Archbishop of Mexico, the President of France, the Cardinal Archbishop of Toledo and Léon Daudet.

— "Seven Years Buried Alive". Seattle: Ritmomaquia, 2013. p202-203

=== Last years ===
In 1934, Biófilo Panclasta began cohabiting with Julia Ruiz, a well-known fortune teller who worked in Bogotá. He dedicated his time to writing for newspapers and granting interviews, also sending letters to some Latin American presidents. His companion died in January 1939. One year later, Biófilo attempted suicide in Barranquilla, electrocuting himself and cutting his throat with a straight razor.

== Thought ==
Biófilo Panclasta's ideas on anarchism were quite idiosyncratic. He oscillated between individualist anarchism and social anarchism, which can be seen in a series of letters he wrote from Barranquilla prison in 1910. At first, Biófilo presented himself as an extreme and radical individualist, echoing the ideas of his favorite philosopher, Nietzsche. Biófilo hated the herd:

My neopagan and artistic soul, my rebellious and individualist temperament, my horror toward multitudes could not instill admiration in this great human foule (mass) who have achieved nothing other than having been hurried from the hands of their masters of yesterday into those that today free them to be under their own weight.

— "Seven Years Buried Alive". Seattle: Ritmomaquia, 2013. p4

For Panclasta, the social struggle he carried out was not for others, but for himself, to feel alive. Fighting for others allowed him, he said, to unfold all his capacities for action, for love or hate.

But Biófilo was just as capable of identifying with social anarchism. Biófilo's opinions on both currents of anarchism are of a piece with his overall way of thinking, that of someone who hated absolutes and extremes, who thought that people are neither completely social nor entirely individual. He tried to distance himself from any form of political militancy, even anarchist organizations. He wrote of a conversation with Kropotkin where he told him:

I am not an anarchist. I am I. I do not abandon one religion for another, one party for another, one sacrifice for another. I am a freed, egoist spirit. I do as I feel. I have no cause but my own.

— "Seven Years Buried Alive". Seattle: Ritmomaquia, 2013. p2

== Works ==
Books in English translation

- Seven Years Buried Alive. Seattle: Ritmomaquia, 2013.

Books in Spanish

- PANCLASTA, Biófilo (1932): "Siete años enterrado vivo en una de las mazmorras de Gomezuela". Tipografía la Libertad, Bogotá.
- VILLANUEVA, Orlando; VEGA, Renán; GAMBOA, Juan, CLAVIJO, Amadeo; FAJARDO, Luis (1992): "Biófilo Panclasta, el eterno prisionero". Ediciones Alas de Xue.

== See also ==
- Political prisoners in Venezuela
