= Fundación de Estudios Superiores Comfanorte =

Private university of Cúcuta, Colombia

FESC University
- Universidad FESC
- Other names: UniFESC
- Motto: Spanish: La Universidad de Comfanorte
- Motto in English: The University of Comfanorte
- Type: Private
- Established: August 25, 1993
- Rector: Carmen Cecilia Quero de González
- Undergraduates: 2,500
- Location: Cúcuta, Norte de Santander, Colombia; 7°52′53″N 72°30′8″W
- Campus: Urban
- Colours: Grey & red
- Mascot: Ringo the dog Terry the tiger
- Website: www.fesc.edu.co

FESC University (officially in Spanish: Fundación de Estudios Superiores Comfanorte, «Comfanorte Higher Studies Foundation»), commonly known as FESC, is a private Colombian university structured as a foundation. It serves the educational needs of the people of Norte de Santander and Colombia and operates under the regulations of Law 1740 of 2014 and Law 30 of 1992 of the Ministry of Education of Colombia. The main campus is located in Cúcuta, Norte de Santander, with an additional campus in the municipality of Ocaña. The university was founded on August 25, 1993, and began its academic activities on August 1, 1995.

The main campus features modern infrastructure to support academic activities and serves as the base for various research groups. The university has multiple agreements, alliances, and institutional networks with national higher education centers and universities, as well as inter-institutional agreements with universities in countries such as Mexico, Argentina, Netherlands, Spain, Brazil, China, among other countries. The institution offers a total of 61 academic programs, including 8 undergraduate programs, 44 diploma programs, 2 specializations, and 7 master's degrees.

== History ==
FESC was founded on August 25, 1993, by the Family Compensation Fund of Norte de Santander (Comfanorte). At the time, the administrative director, Dr. Moisés Sanjuán López, aimed to provide added value to the fund's direct beneficiaries and their families, thereby fulfilling the social functions for which the family compensation funds were established.

The creation of the university marked a significant moment for the development of the department of Norte de Santander, introducing a new dynamic to various aspects of the city's life. From an institutional perspective, the academy operates as a decentralized and independent entity. It is structured as an autonomous university entity with a unique regulatory framework. It is associated with the Ministry of Education of Colombia regarding policies and planning in the education sector, as well as with the National Science and Technology System.

== Symbols ==
Logo

It is the main element of the institutional image. It consists of typography, adopting the initials of the institution (FESC) and at the bottom is the full name of the institution; in addition to having the Comfanorte logo.

Colors

The colors that represent the FESC are grey and red. These colors are used because according to Max Lüscher, gray represents neutrality, in addition to providing brilliance, luxury and elegance. While red, according to Lüscher, is linked to the principle of life and symbolizes value. According to him, it is the expression of the vital force, it is impulse to cause effects and achieve success.

Mascots

The FESC has two mascots: Ringo, a dog that roams the main campus from a puppy. The students adopted him and made him an icon. Terry, a young university tiger who was created in a contest held by the School of Art and Design to determine which would be the new digital mascot of the FESC.

== Infrastructure ==
The institution has two campuses where academic activity takes place: the main campus (Av 5 15–27, Centro) located in the city of Cúcuta and the campus located in the municipality of Ocaña (Kdx 194–785, Vía Universitaria).

Most faculties operate on the main campus, in addition to the institution's research centers, development centers, and auditoriums. On the other hand, some faculties operate on the Ocaña Campus, in addition to serving as an internship site for various academic programs. For the practice of various sports, the institution has the facilities of the Comfanorte College, establishment of its property located in the neighboring municipality of Los Patios.

Cúcuta

- Main Campus: It is located in the city of Cúcuta, in the direction Av 5 # 15–27, Centro. This modern campus houses blocks of classrooms, offices and laboratories for the realization of the academic and sports activities of its students. In addition, inside is the Moisés Sanjuán López Library, the auditoriums Eduardo Assaf Elcure and Quinta Avenida, the financial laboratory, among others. It is divided into two blocks: the administrative block "Pedro Francisco Silva Mantilla" (A and B) and the block Quinta Avenida “Laboratorio de Ideas” (C).
- Comfanorte College: It is located in the municipality of Los Patios, in the direction km 3 Vía La Floresta.

Ocaña

- Campus Ocaña: It is located in the municipality of Ocaña, in the direction of Kdx 194–785, Vía Universitaria.

== Academics ==
Undergraduate
Faculty	Programs
School of administrative sciences	Financial management Business logistics Tourism and Hotel Business Administration; International business administration
School of Art and Design	Graphic design Fashion design
School of Engineering	Software engineering Network engineering
Postgraduate
Academic degree	Area
Diploma programs	See diploma programs
Specializations	Administration of the health Educational management
Master's degrees	Pedagogy; Business Administration; International business Global marketing Information systems management and technology projects Management of virtual education Projects of sustainable development
Technical and Technological programs
Technical	Technological
Tourism operations Graphic production Network installation Logistic operations Accounting processes Marketing; Customs processes Fashion design processes	Tourism services and hotel welfare Advertising design Network management Business logistics International business management Financial management International trade management Fashion design management
