= Park of the Greater Colombia =

Historical and tourist complex in Villa del Rosario, Cúcuta, Venezuela

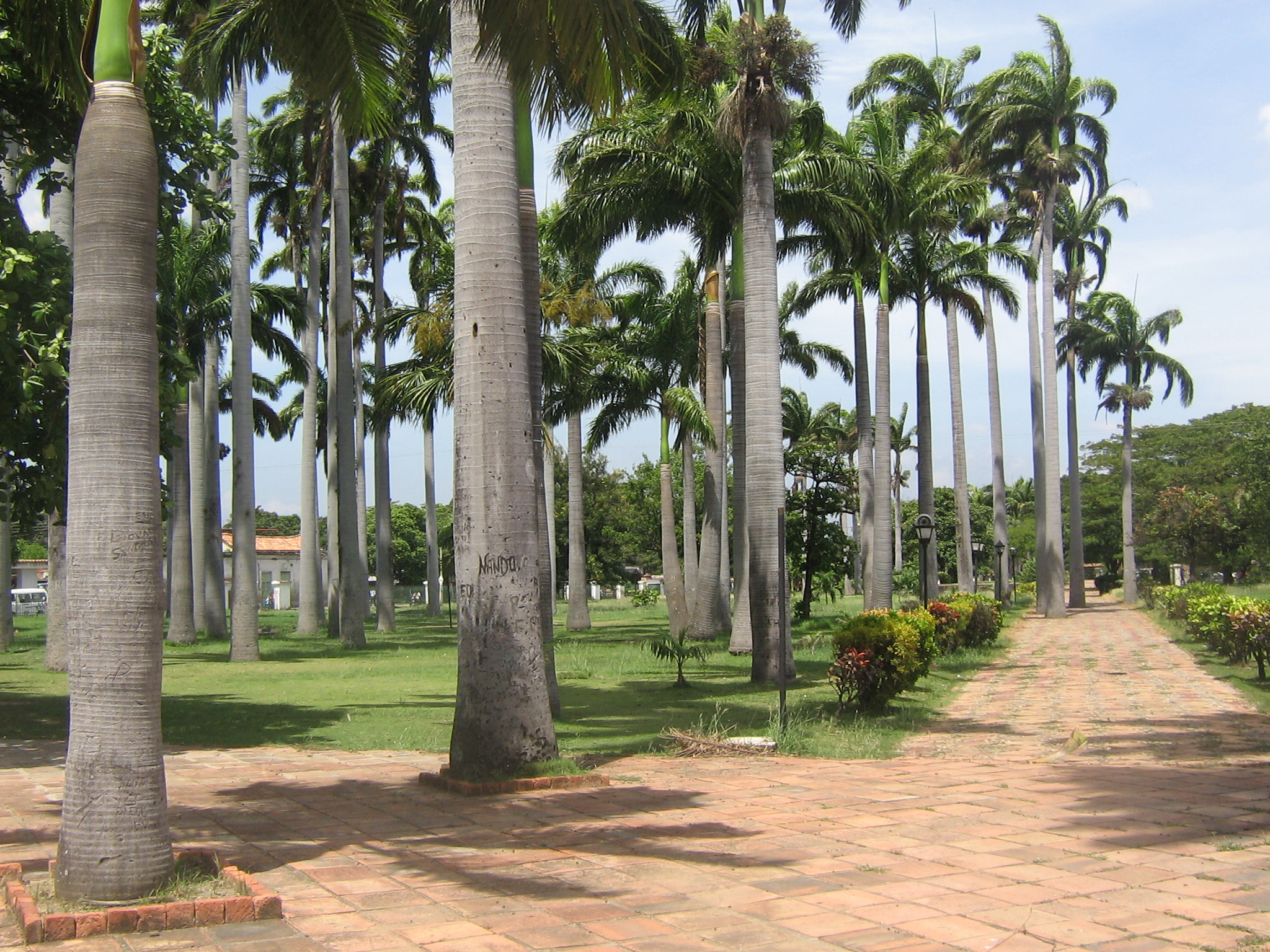
Park of the Greater Colombia

The El Parque de la Gran Colombia (Spanish for Greater Colombia Park or Park of the Greater Colombia) is a historical and tourist complex located in the locality of Villa del Rosario (Cúcuta). It is in the 6th km of International Highway to Venezuela. The park houses:

- The House of Santander, where the hero of the independence Francisco de Paula Santander lived his first 13 years;
- The historic church of Cúcuta, where the Congress of Cúcuta was established and where the Colombian Constitution of 1821 was written;
- The House of the Bagatela, which served as base for the Executive Power in 1821;
- The tamarind tree under which the editors of the constitution of the New Granada (then Colombia and Panama) and patriots from Venezuela rested after the meetings.
