= Juana Rangel de Cuéllar =

Founder of Cúcuta

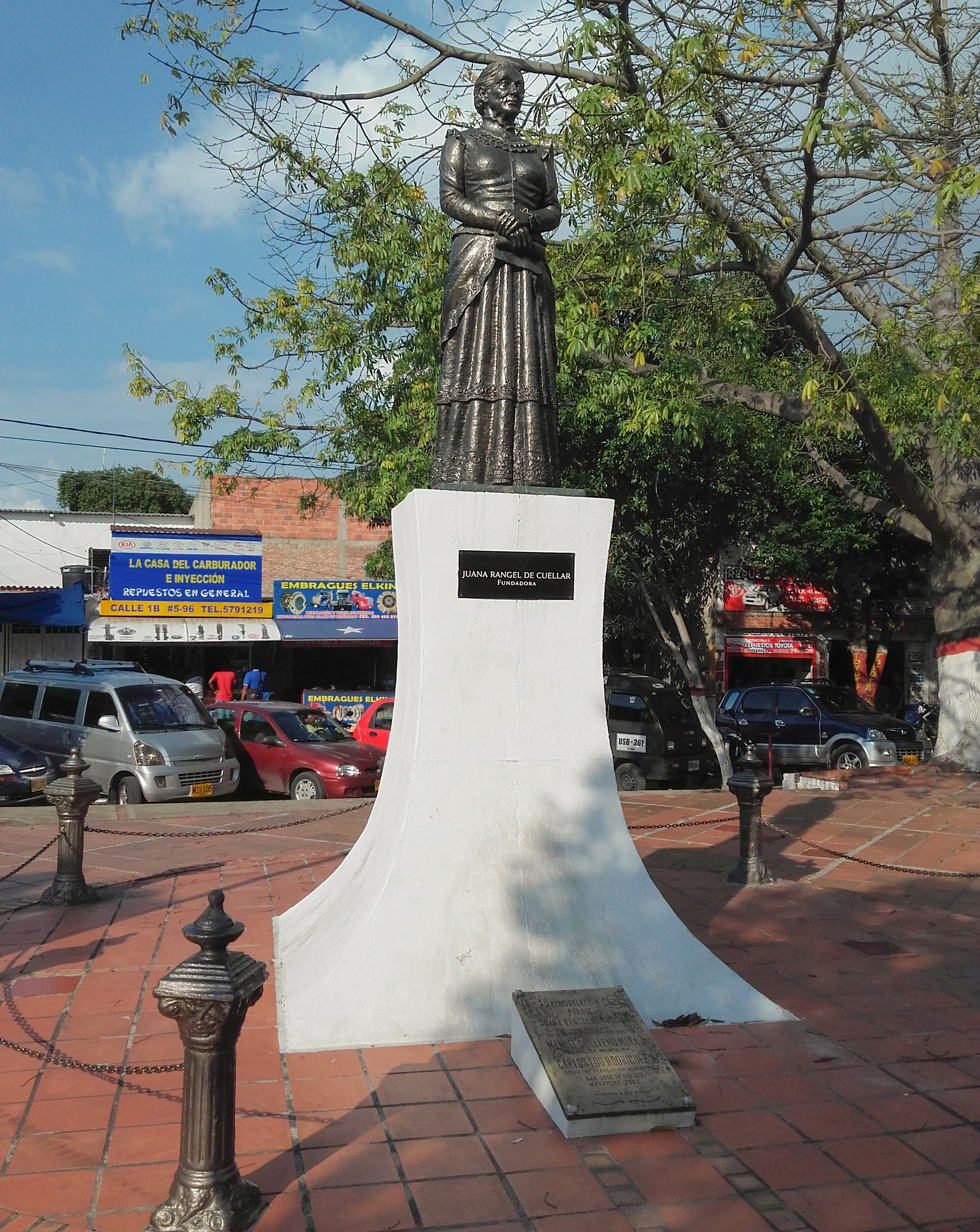

Juana Rangel de Cuellar (6 October 1649 – 1736) was the founder of the Colombian city of Cúcuta, located in the Norte de Santander Department. At the time she founded it in 1733, it was in the Viceroyalty of Peru. She was born and died in Pamplona.

At the age of 23, she was orphaned by her father (1672), and her home was moved to Hacienda Tonchalá, (today the Carmen de Tonchalá district) in the company of Paula, her mother, who died in 1694.

She was the owner of numerous assets, among which were the site of Tonchalá, which she obtained by inheritance from her uncle, the priest Alonso Rangel de Cuéllar; the estancias El Rodeo and Cazadero, owned by her paternal hereditary estate; Morantes, Cerro de Magro, the Guaduas site and the famous Guasimal site.

She was also the owner of numerous heads of cattle and owned the Pamplona manor house, donated by her older brother.

The founder signed deeds of manumission of slaves; among them those are granted on November 10, 1727, in favor of José, 21 years old; those for the benefit of the mulattos Teodora and José Prisio, and a final one, in 1733, in favor of Inés Rafaela.

Enterprising and dynamic, she did not lag behind her landowner neighbors; The economic boom based on agriculture and livestock, which lasted 40 years since her arrival in Tonchalá, was the main reason why different families chose this place as their preferred place for their home.

Tonchalá and Guasimal had everything, except the most important, a parish. On the contrary, on the other side of the Pamplonita River, was the indigenous town of Cúcuta, with a parish, a good church and a doctrinal priest. But there, the whites could not easily access it because the indigenous people of the Pueblo of Cúcuta did not allow it.

Due to the above and because the part occupied by the whites in her farm did not diminish her patrimony, Juana Rangel de Cuéllar considered making a legal and formal donation to the petitioners of the parish.

At the advanced age of 84 years, she went to the mayor of Pamplona, so that together with the clerk they would arrive at his estate in Tonchalá to make before them as representatives of the crown, a donation of half an estancia of a large cattle, which would be a site for the parish and surrounding town. The clerk was not present and in his absence, Mayor Juan Antonio de Villamizar y Pinero acted in his stead. This was the simple birth of the city without borders, on June 17, 1733.

Seven neighbors accepted the deed of donation, twith hree witnesses and 17 people notified as neighbors for the donated lands. The value of the donated land was 50 patacones, the value stipulated in the document that Juana Rangel de Cuéllar signed as a public deed.

Two years later, on June 24, 1735, she assisted as godmother at the baptism of a child in the chapel of the nascent town, and a couple of months later she granted her testamentary memorandum.

Harassed by the ailments of her age, Juana Rangel de Cuéllar was taken back to Pamplona, where she died in 1736.
