= Casa Natal del General Santander =

Biographical museum in Colombia

Coordinates: 7°50′01″N 72°27′26″W

The Casa Natal del General Santander (lit., "Birth house of General Santander") is the birthplace of the Colombian General Francisco de Paula Santander, and is where he lived until the age of 13.

It is in the municipality of Villa del Rosario in Cúcuta, along the International Highway to Venezuela.

The building now holds a museum that contains many of Santander's possessions, including his uniform and swords. The house is in the Park of the Great Colombia, which also contains the historic church of Cúcuta (where the Colombian Constitution of 1821 was written and signed), and the House of the Bagatela, the seat of Colombia's government in its early years.

== Gallery ==
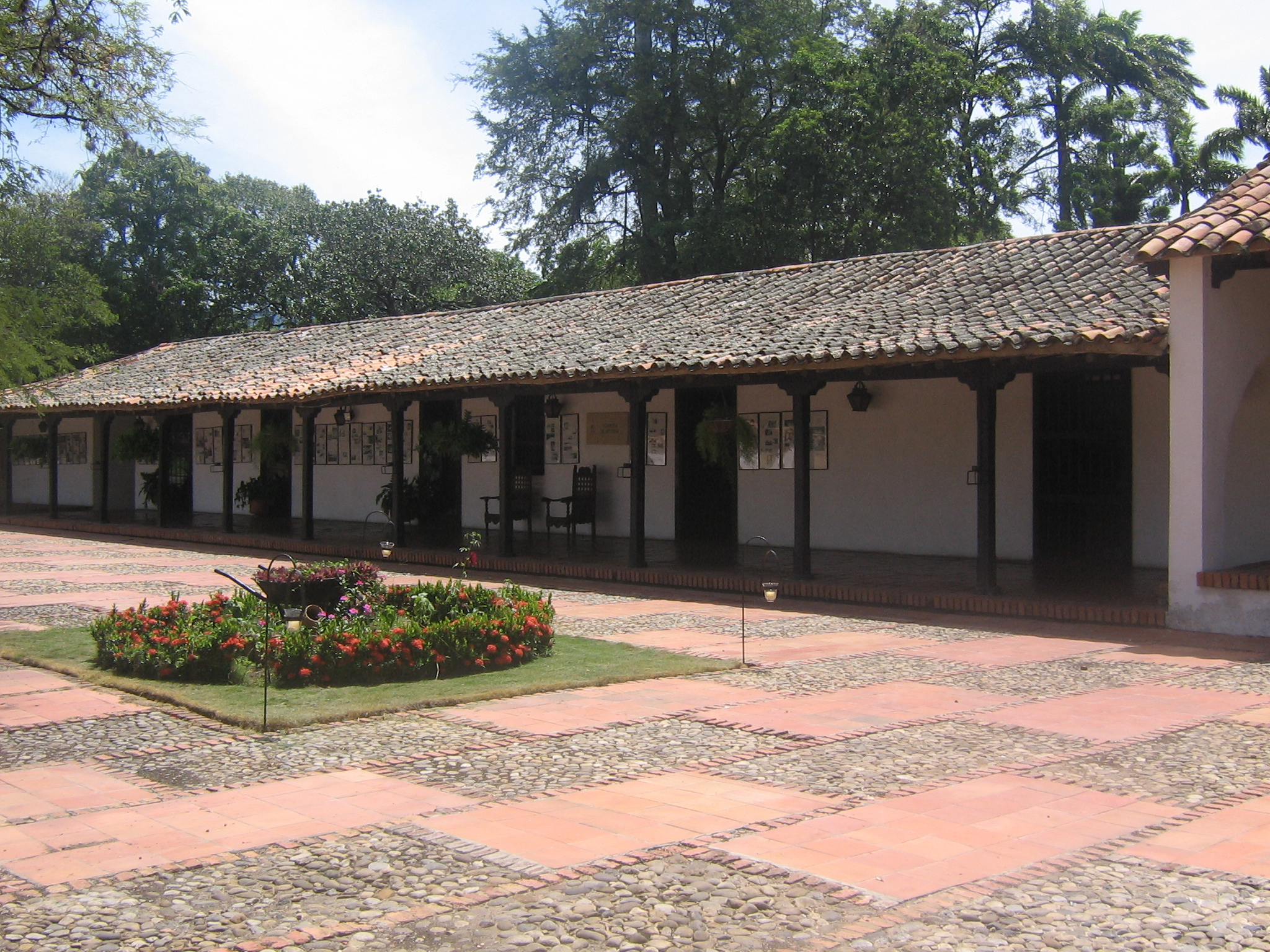
The house of Francisco Santander

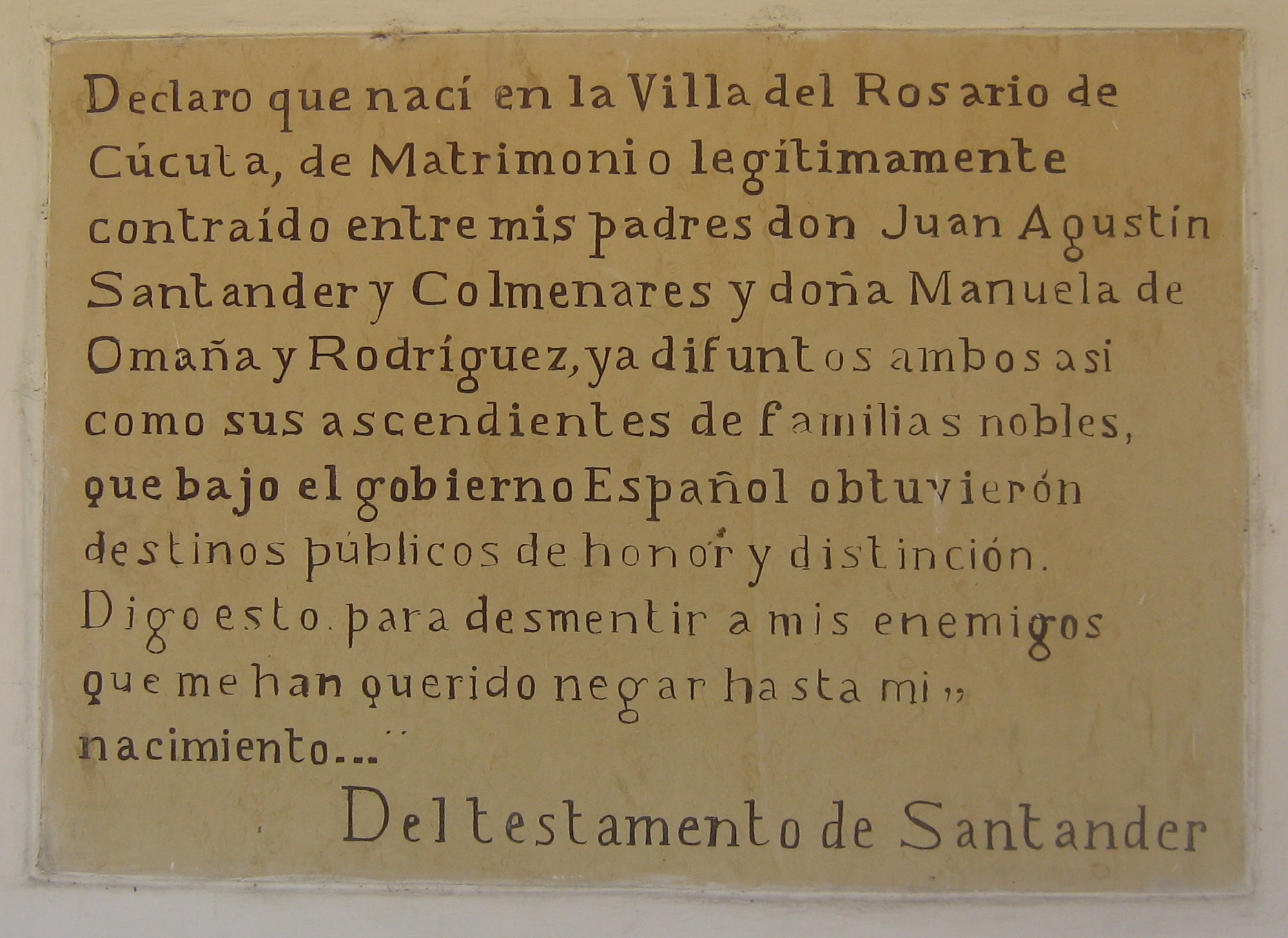
Testament of Santander

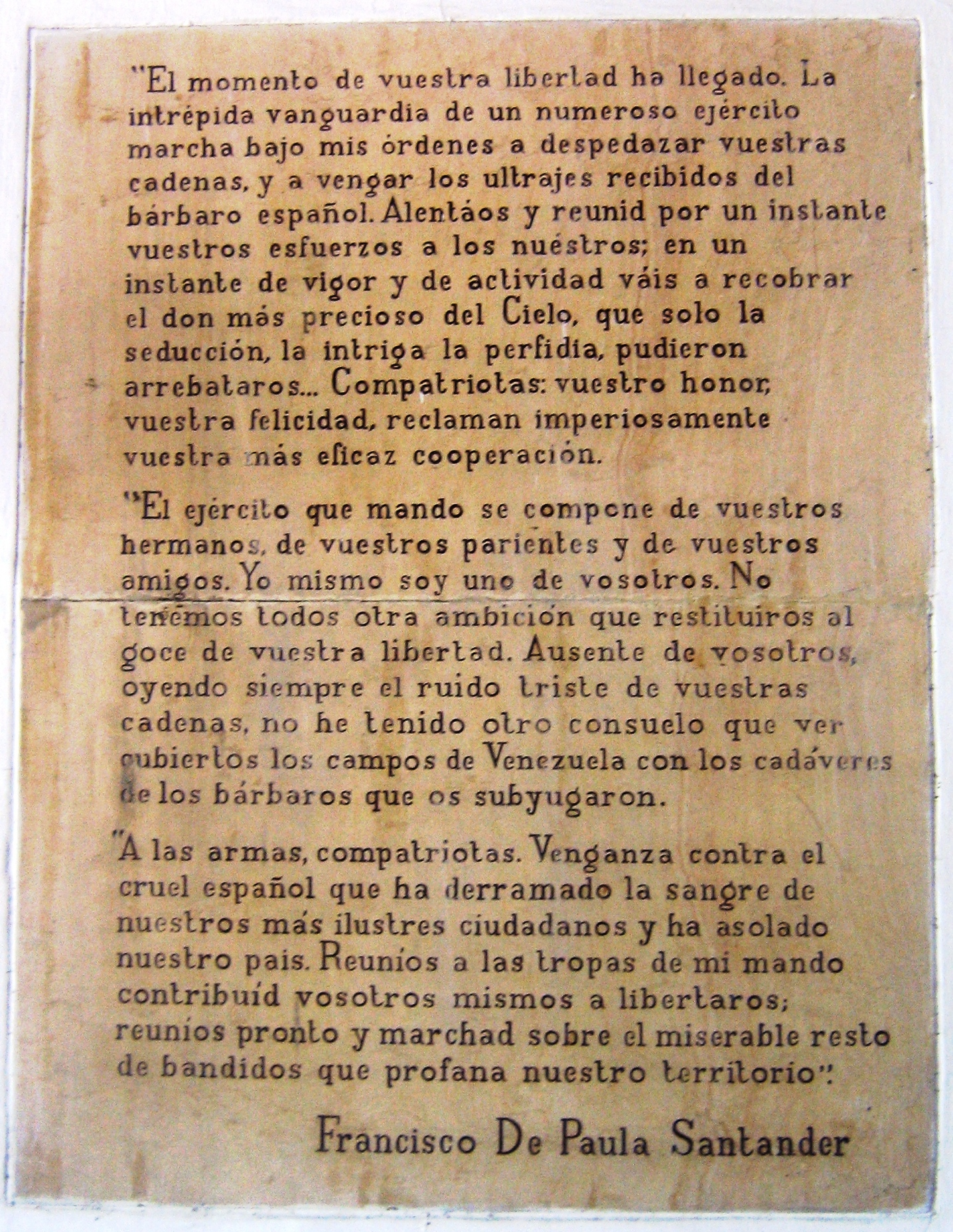
Speech of Santander
