= Chinácota =

Coordinates: 7°37′N 72°36′W

- Municipality
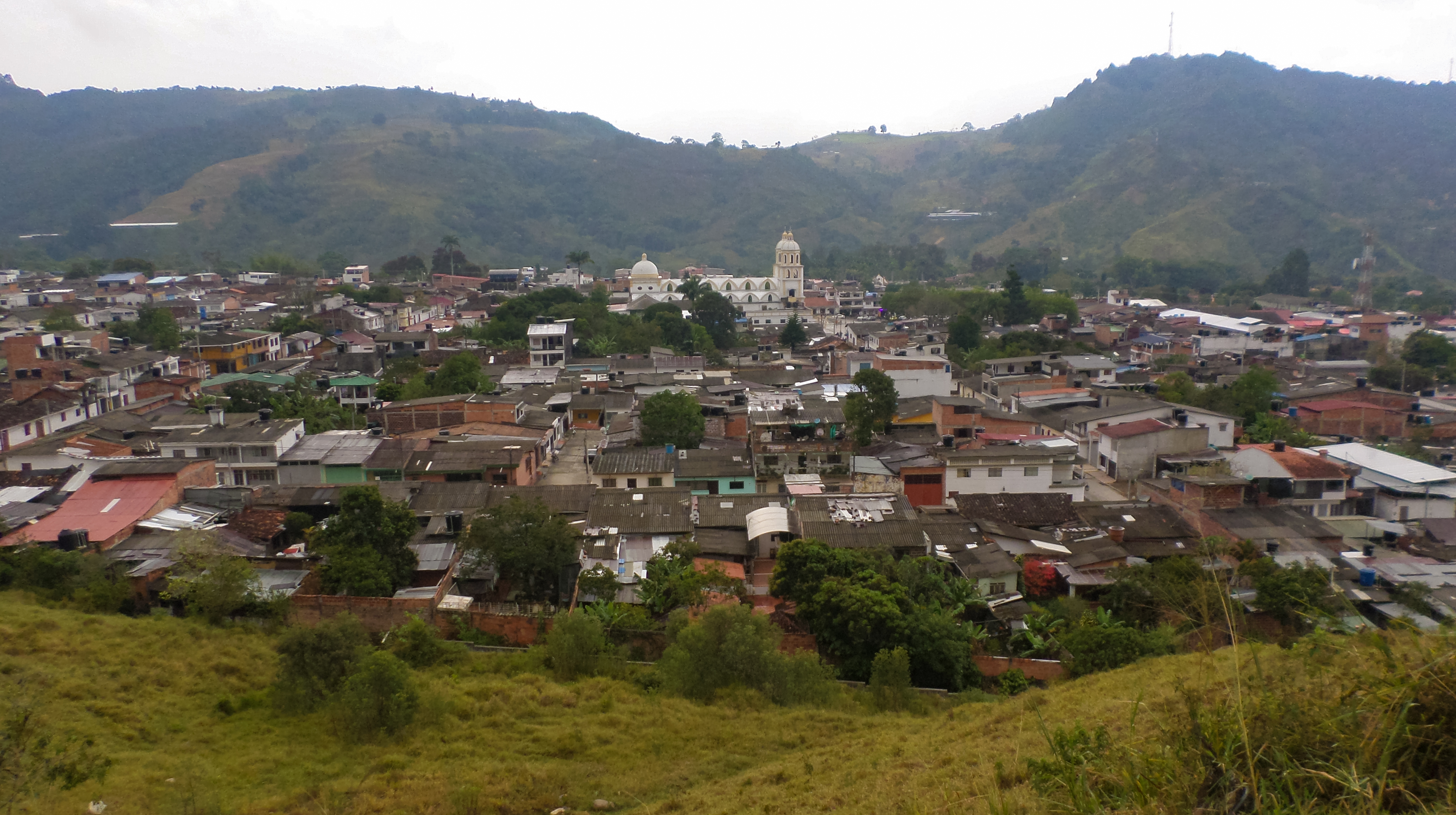
- View of Chinácota

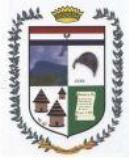
- Flag Coat of arms

- Location of the municipality and town of Chinácota in the Norte de Santander Department of Colombia
- Country: Colombia
- Department: Norte de Santander Department

Area
  - Land: 166.64 km^{2} (64.34 sq mi)
- Elevation: 1,175 m (3,855 ft)

Population (2015)
  - Municipality: 16,348
  - Density: 98.104/km^{2} (254.09/sq mi)
  - Urban: 11,086
- Time zone: UTC-5 (Colombia Standard Time)
- Climate: Af

Chinácota is a small town and municipality located in the Norte de Santander department in Colombia. This department is located in the north-eastern region of the country, near the border with Venezuela. Chinácota has a population of approximately 19,845 people (town plus surroundings, as of June 2024) according to statistics provided by DANE (Departamento Administrativo Nacional de Estadistica / National Administrative Department of Statistics) on a July 30 2025 report.

The municipality of Chinácota extends over 167 square kilometers and is located at an approximate altitude of 1,175 meters over the sea level. The average temperature range is between 12 and 22 degrees Celsius.

The urban area of Chinácota comprises about 29 neighborhoods and includes a residential count of approximately 2,600 houses. Chinácota was expected to grow by about 66% by 2011.

== History ==
Chinácota emerged from the evolution of a settlement presumed to have originated with the natives who inhabited the region. Mentions of Chinácota began after the death of the German conquistador Ambrosio Alfinger within its current territory in May 1533. The territory that makes up the modern municipality's jurisdiction is presumed to have been inhabited in the 16th century by a branch of the Chitarera family. According to local legend, the area became inhabited under tribal leader Chinaquillo, who led Chitarero warriors who killed Alfinger.

The founding of the municipality dates back historically to 22 June 1586, when Captain Alonso de Montalvo described and settled the Chinácota Indians. He summoned Juan Ramírez de Andrada, encomendero (commendation officer), Father Fray Miguel de Victoria, priest of the region encompassing Pamplona River valley, and town leader Diego Caypaquema, to give them "a plan for the construction of the streets and plaza, and everything else that would be necessary for the town." And he ordered them, through the "tongue," or interpreter, to build their doctrinal chapel, to build their huts for permanent settlement. He also ordered Father Miguel de Victoria to provide them with the doctrine, and Ramírez to pay the stipends of the doctrinal priest as ornaments and jewelry for the doctrinal chapel (AGN, Colonia: Poblaciones SC 46).

The municipality was a mandatory stopover on five occasions by the liberator Simón Bolívar.

In 1902, in a house located at 5-42 Carrera 4 Avenue in the El Centro barrio, the Treaty of Chinácota was signed to end the Thousand Days' War. The Iscala estate was the residence of President Ramón González Valencia. Chinácota was established as a municipality between 1839 and 1840.

== Notable people ==
- Jhoan Arenas (born 1990), footballer
- Biofilo Panclasta (1879-1943), activist

== Climate ==
Climate data for Chinácota (Blonay), elevation 1,235 m (4,052 ft), (1981–2010)
Month	Jan	Feb	Mar	Apr	May	Jun	Jul	Aug	Sep	Oct	Nov	Dec	Year
Mean daily maximum °C (°F)	25.2 (77.4)	25.4 (77.7)	25.5 (77.9)	25.9 (78.6)	26.8 (80.2)	26.7 (80.1)	26.6 (79.9)	27.4 (81.3)	27.3 (81.1)	26.6 (79.9)	25.6 (78.1)	24.8 (76.6)	26.1 (79.0)
Daily mean °C (°F)	19.6 (67.3)	20.0 (68.0)	20.4 (68.7)	20.8 (69.4)	21.0 (69.8)	20.5 (68.9)	20.2 (68.4)	20.7 (69.3)	20.7 (69.3)	20.6 (69.1)	20.2 (68.4)	19.4 (66.9)	20.3 (68.5)
Mean daily minimum °C (°F)	15.0 (59.0)	15.6 (60.1)	16.2 (61.2)	16.7 (62.1)	16.6 (61.9)	15.9 (60.6)	15.5 (59.9)	15.8 (60.4)	15.9 (60.6)	16.3 (61.3)	16.0 (60.8)	15.1 (59.2)	15.9 (60.6)
Average precipitation mm (inches)	44.4 (1.75)	57.6 (2.27)	57.7 (2.27)	161.3 (6.35)	136.9 (5.39)	75.9 (2.99)	61.7 (2.43)	86.3 (3.40)	146.4 (5.76)	245.4 (9.66)	190.9 (7.52)	100.2 (3.94)	1,364.6 (53.72)
Average relative humidity (%)	83	82	82	83	81	81	80	79	80	82	85	85	82
Mean monthly sunshine hours	130.2	96.0	80.6	96.0	111.6	120.0	124.0	130.2	123.0	111.6	102.0	127.1	1,352.3
Mean daily sunshine hours	4.2	3.4	2.6	3.2	3.6	4.0	4.0	4.2	4.1	3.6	3.4	4.1	3.7
Source: Instituto de Hidrologia Meteorologia y Estudios Ambientales
