= Los Patios =

- Municipality
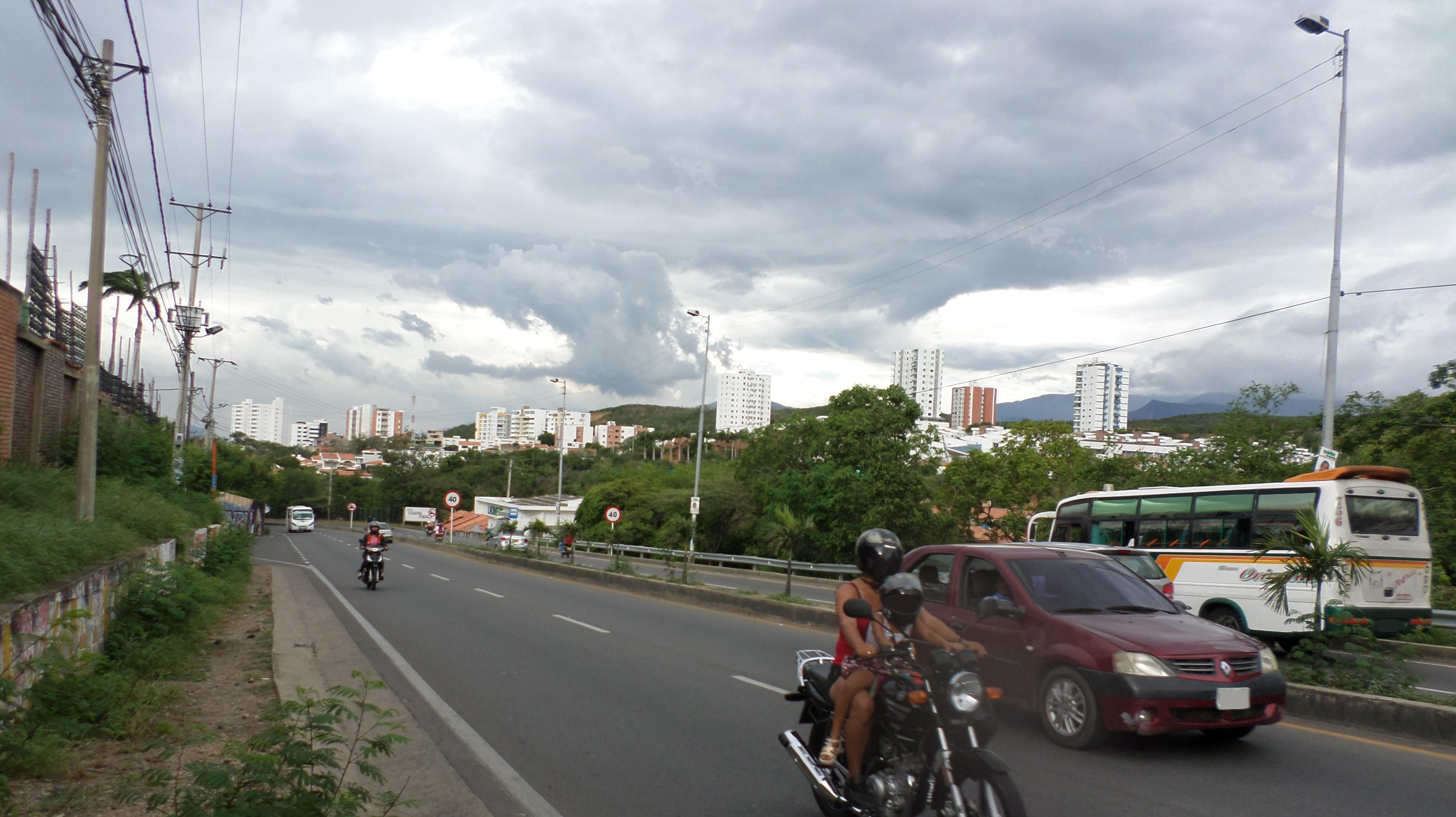

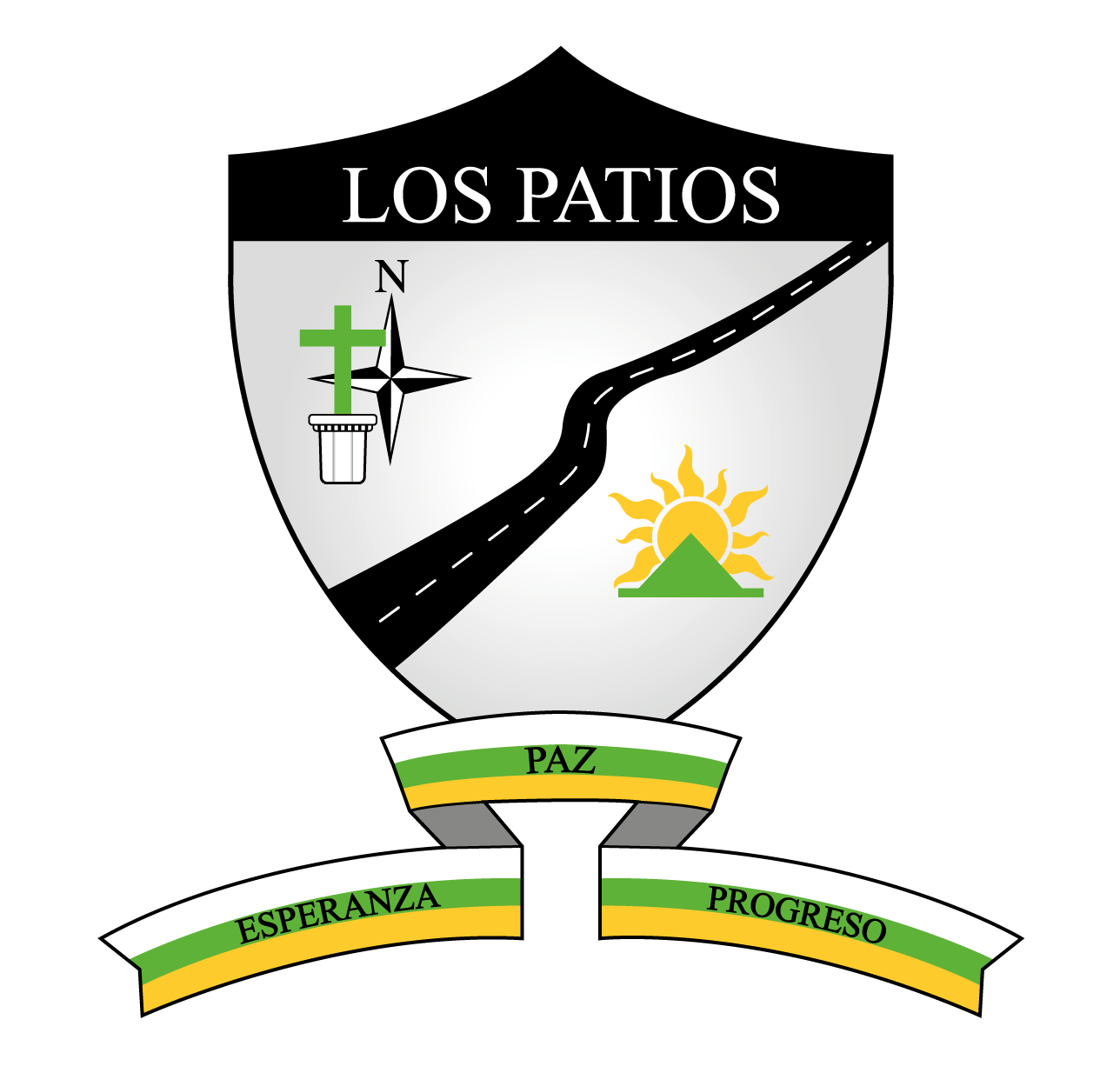
- Flag Coat of arms

- Location of the municipality and town of Los Patios in the Norte de Santander Department of Colombia.

- Location in Colombia
- Coordinates: 7°50′28″N 72°30′48″W
- Country: Colombia
- Department: North of Santander
- Incorporated: 1985

Area
  - Municipality: 127.6 km^{2} (49.3 sq mi)
  - Urban: 10.4 km^{2} (4.0 sq mi)
- Elevation: 410 m (1,350 ft)

Population (2020 est.)
  - Municipality: 97,220
  - Density: 761.9/km^{2} (1,973/sq mi)
  - Urban: 94,847
  - Urban density: 9,120/km^{2} (23,600/sq mi)
- Demonym: Patiense
- Time zone: UTC-5 (Colombia Standard Time)
- Area code: 57 + 7
- Website: Official website (in Spanish)

Los Patios is a municipality and town in the Department of Norte de Santander, northeastern Colombia. As of 2012, it has a population of 77,588

== History ==
The history of this community begins in the 17th century. It began as the hacienda "Los Patios", which developed into a small country town, which later became a corregimiento de Villa del Rosario and still later the 37th municipality of Norte de Santander. According to historical records, the proprietors of the original hacienda included Juan Aranda, Carlos Matamoros, and Reinaldo Viccini, who engaged in agriculture, principally of cacao.

Other nearby haciendas now incorporated into the municipality were La Rinconada (now Tennis Club and the Colegio Santo Ángel), Kilómetro tres (now Urb. La Floresta), Los Colorados over the plain of the River Pamplonita; Los Vados; El Hato, Located on the land that is now the Kilómetro 8 neighborhood; El Suspiro (today Vereda Agua Linda); La Garita, Buenos Aires (near los Vados) and García, owned by Agustín García, now the recreational park San Rafael.

== Geography and climate ==
Altitude: 250 metres above sea level
Climate: warm

== Economy ==
- Cement industry
- Agriculture
- Cattle ranching
- Mining

== Festivals ==
- 5-10 December: Municipal fair and fiesta
- 11 November: Town fiesta
- Feasts of Saint Peter and Saint Paul

== Attractions ==
- Santa Cruz Monument
- Florentina Salas park, named after a local resistance heroine, executed by firing squad
- 'Eduardo Cote Lamus' Park
