= Historic church of Cúcuta =

Coordinates: 7°49′44″N 72°27′46″W

Church of the Holy Rosary
- Iglesia del Rosario
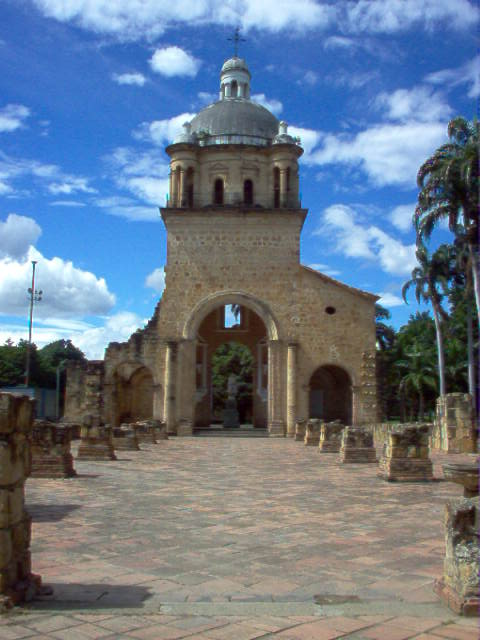
- Church of the Holy Rosary
- Location: Villa del Rosario, Norte de Santander, Colombia
- Denomination: Roman Catholic

Architecture
- Functional status: Closed
- Heritage designation: 1935
- Demolished: 1875

The Historic church of Cúcuta or Historic Temple of Cucuta (Spanish: Templo Historico de Cucuta) is a historic site where the first constitution of Colombia was written and signed. It is located in the city of Villa del Rosario in the metropolitan area of Cúcuta, and very close to the Venezuelan border. The site was almost entirely destroyed by the earthquake of 1875, and later partially rebuilt. It is part of the National Monuments of Colombia since 1935.

== See also ==
- Congress of Cúcuta
- Francisco de Paula Santander
- Simón Bolivar
