= Catatumbo region =

Region of Colombia

Catatumbo Region Región del Catatumbo
- Map of the Catatumbo River drainage basin
- Country: Colombia
- Department: Cesar Department, Norte de Santander Department

Area
  - Total: 4,826 km^{2} (1,863 sq mi)

Population
  - Total: 288,452

The Catatumbo region is a region of Colombia. It is located in the northeast of the department of Norte de Santander with a small part in the southwest of the department of Cesar, which extends between the Eastern Cordillera of Colombia and Lake Maracaibo, which is why the region has come to be considered "transborder". This region in Colombia is made up of 13 municipalities: Ábrego, Convención, El Carmen, El Tarra, González, Hacarí, La Playa de Belén, Ocaña, Río de Oro, San Calixto, Sardinata, Teorama and Tibu. This region is part of the PDET development plan's target territories.

== Etymology ==
The name of this region comes from the main river that runs through it, the Catatumbo.

== History ==
During the colonization process, there were different periods of productive hegemony. Sugar cane and cocoa had their heyday in the 17th and 18th centuries, but coffee, since independence, was the primary specialized product during the 19th century in the economic phase known as the primary export model.

The 20th century saw a process of change in international production relations. After World War I, Western countries saw the importance of oil as an energy resource, and this accelerated the discovery of reserves and subsequent drilling worldwide. Catatumbo became one of the first corners of oil exploitation in Colombia, with abundant and high-quality oil. In 1918, the so-called "Barco Concession" known as Concesión Barco was approved, owned by General Virgilio Barco, with the aim of giving a single company, Compañía de Petróleos de Colombia SA (with U.S. capital), the right to exploit, process and distribute or market the oil found. With the increase in international oil trade, in 1936 the Concession passed into the hands of the U.S. companies Texaco and Mobil Oil. The international demand for oil was growing and the construction of an oil pipeline was needed to carry oil from Catatumbo to the Caribbean Coast and thus be able to distribute it over long distances. With the export project, Colombian wealth was no longer consumed by the majority of Colombians, and it also brought new conflicts.

The region has been one of the hardest hit by the internal armed conflict in Colombia, with the presence of different armed actors, affecting the civilian population and the environment. In the 21st century, the region was the scene of the Catatumbo campaign. The 2025 Catatumbo clashes have resulted in the deaths of more than a hundred of people.

== Characteristics ==
The region has a great climatic variety and is rich in mineral resources such as oil, coal, and uranium; its soils are suitable for diversified agriculture, presenting diverse types of crops such as coffee, cocoa, corn, beans, rice, banana, and cassava. Likewise, livestock is a strong line in the region and its rivers have a great variety of fish, which have served as food for a long time to the riverside inhabitants (mainly the Motilón-Bari indigenous people). It is a highly disputed area between groups outside the law, since its climatic conditions are suitable for large-scale cultivation of coca leaves, the raw material used in the manufacture of cocaine. There are also laboratories that produce cocaine which take advantage of the dense jungle of the region to remain hidden from the Armed Forces and National Police, who fight these illegal groups and their sources of financing.

Lake Maracaibo of the Catatumbo region is the location with highest occurrence of lightning in the world.

== See also ==
- Catatumbo Barí National Natural Park
- 2025 Catatumbo attacks
