= Durania =

Municipality and town in Norte de Santander, Colombia

- Municipality and town
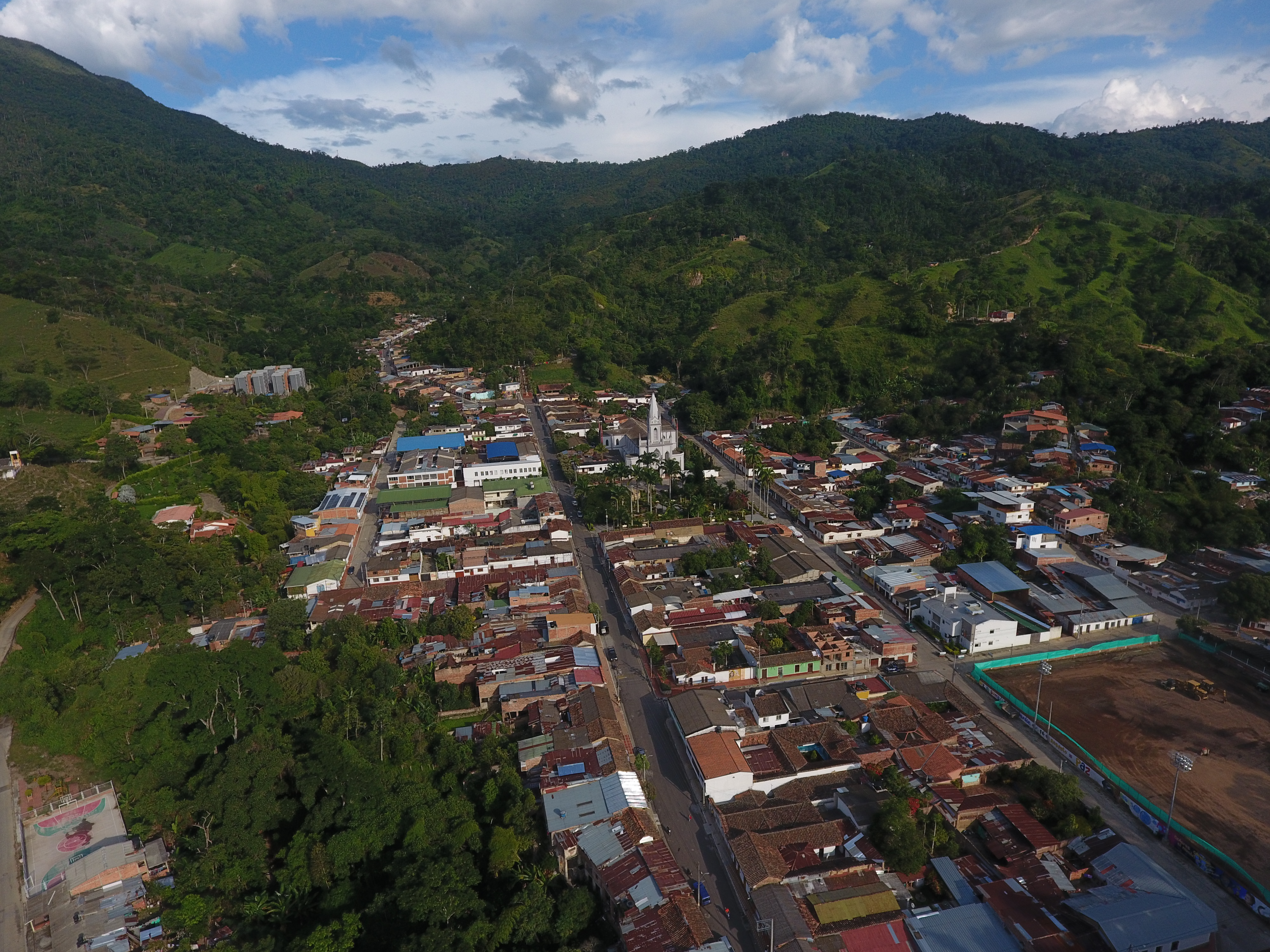

- Flag Coat of arms

- Location of Durania in Norte de Santander, Colombia
- Coordinates: 7.71722°N 72.66°W
- Country: Colombia
- Department: Norte de Santander
- Founded: 1 May 1911
- Founder: Segundo Antonio Gonzáles & Virginia Acosta de Gonzáles

Government
  - Mayor: Marlyn Yohana Marquez Rivera (2016–2019)

Area
  - Land: 177.4 km^{2} (68.5 sq mi)
  - Urban: 0.03647 km^{2} (0.01408 sq mi)
- Elevation: 940 m (3,080 ft)

Population (2015)
  - Municipality and town: 3,768
  - Density: 21.24/km^{2} (55.01/sq mi)
  - Urban: 1,802
  - Urban density: 49,410/km^{2} (128,000/sq mi)
- Demonym: Duraniense
- Time zone: UTC−5 (Colombia Standard Time)
- Website: Official website

Durania is a Colombian municipality and town located in the department of Norte de Santander. It is 47 kilometres (29 mi) southwest of the departmental capital Cúcuta.

== Geography ==
Durania is located in the Eastern Ranges of the Colombian Andes at altitudes ranging from 500 to 2,000 metres (1,600 to 6,600 ft). The urban area centers around 940 metres (3,080 ft). The municipality is part of the Zulia River watershed. The municipality borders Santiago and San Cayetano in the north, Arboledas and Bochalema in the south, Arboledas, Santiago and Salazar de las Palmas in the west and Bochalema in the east.

== History ==
The terrain of Durania before the Spanish conquest was inhabited by the Oporoma tribe, possibly a mixture of Carib and Chibcha people, though little is known about this tribe. In those times, Durania functioned as a transport location between the Chitarero and Motilon peoples. Modern Durania was founded on May 1, 1911 by Segundo Antonio Gonzáles and Virginia Acosta de Gonzáles.
