= Restrepia echinata =

Conservation status
- CITES Appendix II

Scientific classification
- Kingdom: Plantae
- Clade: Tracheophytes
- Clade: Angiosperms
- Clade: Monocots
- Order: Asparagales
- Family: Orchidaceae
- Subfamily: Epidendroideae
- Genus: Restrepia
- Species: R. echinata

Binomial name
- Restrepia echinata Luer & R.Escobar

Species of flowering plant

Restrepia echinata is a species of flowering plant in the Orchidaceae family. It is an epiphyte.

Restrepia echinata is native to the wet tropical biome of eastern Colombia and Peru.

== Taxonomy ==
The species was described by Carlyle A. Luer and Rodrigo Escobar in 1996. The type specimens were collected by Luer, Escobar, and two colleagues, at an elevation of 1,730 metres (5,680 ft). The specimens were found in Sardinata, in Colombia's Norte de Santander Department.

== Conservation ==
Restrepia echinata is listed in Appendix II of CITES. There are no quotas or suspensions in place for the species.
