= Peperomia venezueliana =

Scientific classification
- Kingdom: Plantae
- Clade: Embryophytes
- Clade: Tracheophytes
- Clade: Angiosperms
- Clade: Magnoliids
- Order: Piperales
- Family: Piperaceae
- Genus: Peperomia
- Species: P. venezueliana

Binomial name
- Peperomia venezueliana C.DC.

Synonyms
- Peperomia ernstiana C.DC. Peperomia longipes C.DC. Peperomia horrescens Trel.

Species of herb

Peperomia venezueliana is a species of herb and hemiepiphyte subshrub from the genus Peperomia. It grows in wet tropical biomes. It was discovered by Casimir de Candolle in 1866, in Venezuela.

== Etymology ==
Venezueliana came from the country "Venezuela". This refers to the species being discovered in Venezuela.

== Distribution ==
Peperomia venezueliana is native to Venezuela and Colombia. In Colombia, specimens can be found at an altitude of 1000–2300 meters. In Venezuela, specimens can be found at an altitude of 350-1250 meters.

- Venezuela
  - Carabobo
  - Monagas
  - Bolívar
  - Amazonas
  - Lara
    - Quebrada de Oro
  - Táchira
    - Junín
      - Quebrada Agua Blanca
  - Aragua
    - Colonia Tovar
  - Yaracuy
    - Sierra de Aroa
  - Mérida
    - Cerro El Toro
  - Anzoátegui
  - Miranda
    - Sucre
      - El Avila National Park
  - Cojedes
    - Ricaurte
  - Falcón
  - Guárico
  - Trujillo
- Colombia
  - Antioquia
    - Envigado
    - Betania
    - Frontino
    - Caldas
    - Anorí
  - Magdalena
    - Santa Marta
      - Sierra de Onaca
  - Santander
    - Río Suratá valley
  - Meta
    - La Macarena
      - Tinigua National Park
  - Norte de Santander
    - Herrán

Peperomia longipes

- Colombia
  - Magdalena
    - Santa Marta
      - Sierra de Ouaca

Peperomia ernstiana

- Venezuela
  - Aragua

== Description ==
Leaves alternate, briefly petiolate, Oval lance, and Pointed tip. They are glabrous on both sides. It trails on the ground, dry stem, flattened, glabrous, and the edge of the leaves is 0,035.

== Subtaxa ==
These subtaxa following varieties are accepted.

Peperomia venezueliana var. aterrima Trel. & Yunck.

Peperomia venezueliana var. venezueliana
