= Ragonvalia =

Coordinates: 7°35′N 72°29′W

- Municipality and town
- Flag

- Location of the municipality and town of Ragonvalia in the Norte de Santander Department of Colombia.
- Country: Colombia
- Department: Norte de Santander Department

Area
  - Land: 95.8 km^{2} (37.0 sq mi)
- Elevation: 1,615 m (5,299 ft)

Population (2015)
  - Municipality and town: 6,891
  - Urban: 2,897
- Time zone: UTC-5 (Colombia Standard Time)
- Climate: Cfb

Ragonvalia (Spanish pronunciation: [raɣomˈbalja]) is a Colombian municipality and town located in the department of North Santander.

== History ==
The municipality was founded in 1860 thanks to migration from the neighbouring towns of Chinácota, el Chopo (today known as Pamplonita) and Villa del Rosario that emigrated to the limits of the Táchira River (the river that divides Colombia and Venezuela). They traversed the mountain range because of the civil war of 1860–1862. Thus the first camps were established in the valley consisting of the streams Paso Antiguo and La Hormadera.

In the historic archives are mentioned Miguel Contreras, Juan Tarazona y Rafael Quintero as the first to obtain property titles in these terrains. It was Quintero who drew in the initial settlers.

The president of the Sovereign State of Santander Solón Wilches, through a decree of the 27th of September 1881, created the settlement of "Planadas". On the 3rd of September 1887, the Governor of Santander, General Alejandro Peña Solano, erected the hamlets of Mundo Nuevo and "La Honda", and with Chinácota being the municipal seat its territory was attached to the judicial circuit of the notary of Chinácota.

In 1892, Through a decree from the Assembly of Santander, it changed its name to Concordia in honour of the values of peace and unity rooted in the spirit of the first settlers.

On the 14th of April 1930, the Assembly of Norte de Santander ordered that Concordia be renamed as "Ragonvalia" in honour of "Patricio Ramón González Valencia", who was president of Colombia and a native of Norte de Santander. During these years the population grew and its economy expanded due to the smuggling of coffee between Colombia and Venezuela.

== Climate ==
Climate data for Ragonvalia (Esperanza La), elevation 1,760 m (5,770 ft), (1981–2010)
Month	Jan	Feb	Mar	Apr	May	Jun	Jul	Aug	Sep	Oct	Nov	Dec	Year
Mean daily maximum °C (°F)	20.8 (69.4)	21.1 (70.0)	21.5 (70.7)	22.0 (71.6)	22.4 (72.3)	22.1 (71.8)	21.7 (71.1)	22.2 (72.0)	22.3 (72.1)	22.0 (71.6)	21.2 (70.2)	20.7 (69.3)	21.7 (71.1)
Daily mean °C (°F)	15.9 (60.6)	16.2 (61.2)	16.8 (62.2)	17.3 (63.1)	17.6 (63.7)	17.3 (63.1)	17.0 (62.6)	17.2 (63.0)	17.3 (63.1)	17.3 (63.1)	17.0 (62.6)	16.3 (61.3)	16.9 (62.4)
Mean daily minimum °C (°F)	11.5 (52.7)	12.0 (53.6)	12.7 (54.9)	13.5 (56.3)	13.8 (56.8)	13.4 (56.1)	12.9 (55.2)	13.1 (55.6)	13.2 (55.8)	13.4 (56.1)	13.1 (55.6)	12.2 (54.0)	12.9 (55.2)
Average precipitation mm (inches)	47.8 (1.88)	45.2 (1.78)	75.0 (2.95)	163.3 (6.43)	172.9 (6.81)	125.5 (4.94)	116.0 (4.57)	142.2 (5.60)	187.8 (7.39)	234.4 (9.23)	169.0 (6.65)	81.3 (3.20)	1,542.5 (60.73)
Average precipitation days	10	10	11	17	18	20	21	21	20	21	18	12	199
Average relative humidity (%)	89	90	91	91	89	90	89	88	88	89	91	91	90
Source: Instituto de Hidrologia Meteorologia y Estudios Ambientales
