= Pamplona Colonial House Museum =

- Established: February 6, 1962; 63 years ago
- Location: Pamplona, Colombia
- Coordinates: 7.377410°N 72.651451°W
- Type: History museum

The Pamplona Colonial House Museum (Spanish: Museo Casa Colonial de Pamplona) is a museum located in northeastern Colombia. It is one of the oldest museums in the department of Norte de Santander.

== History ==
The building is one of the oldest in Pamplona dating back to the early days of Spanish colonization. The structure of the building is of colonial architecture and was built in the 17th century. The building where the museum is located belonged to the director of the Colombian Liberal Party in Santander, Paulo Emilio Villar, this building was the residence of his daughters. The house was transformed into a museum by Departmental Ordinance No. 46 of 1960. The museum was inaugurated in February 1962, the opening ceremony was attended by President Aberto Lleras Camargo, as well as ecclesiastical authorities of Norte de Santander.

== Collections ==
The museum has in its possession collections of historical objects. The museum contains pre-Columbian pottery and artifacts from indigenous groups of Norte de Santander such as the U'wa and Barí people. The museum also has a mummy and bones as well as objects of the Chitarero culture. The museum also contains sacred art from colonial times. The museum contains exhibits about the Independence of Colombia as well as information about the early days of the establishment of the republic. The museum contains fragments of the Bolivar plane that crashed in Pamplona, as well as typewriters, oil paintings, coins and medals. The museum also exhibits photographs of the Thousand Days' War.
