= Santiago Municipality =

Santiago Municipality may refer to:

- Santiago (commune), Chile
- Santiago, Norte de Santander, Colombia
- Santiago, Rio Grande do Sul, Brazil
- Santiago, Agusan del Norte, Philippines
- Santiago, Ilocos Sur, Philippines
