= House of the Bagatela =

- Casa de la Bagatela
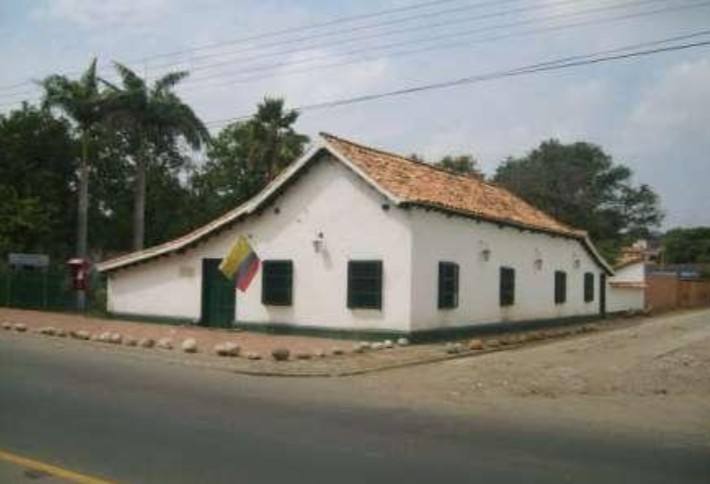
- the modern casa del la bagatela

General information
- Location: Villa del Rosario, Metropolitan Area of Cúcuta, Norte de Santander, Colombia
- Destroyed: 18 May 1875 Cúcuta earthquake

The House of the Bagatela (Casa de la Bagatela) or Government House was the seat of executive power in Colombia in 1821. At the time of the Congress, this house had two levels that were demolished by the 1875 Cúcuta earthquake.

This was the house of the Colombian vice-presidents Roscio, Azuola, Antonio Nariño and Castillo.

It was reconstructed in 1971 by the Ministerio de Obras Públicas (Ministry of Public Works). The name of la Bagatela ("The Triviality") was given to it by a person who inhabited it 40 years ago, who wanted to remember la Bagatela, the newspaper founded by Antonio Nariño in Bogotá in 1812, during the time of the "Patria Boba". However, in Villa del Rosario, the first official newspaper was Gaceta de Colombia and not la Bagatela.
