= 1875 Cúcuta earthquake =

Earthquake in Colombia and Venezuela

- Location within Colombia
- UTC time: 1875-05-18
- Local date: 18 May 1875
- Local time: 11:15
- Magnitude: M_{w} 6.75
- Epicenter: 7.9°N 72.5°W
- Areas affected: Colombia, Venezuela
- Casualties: ~10,000

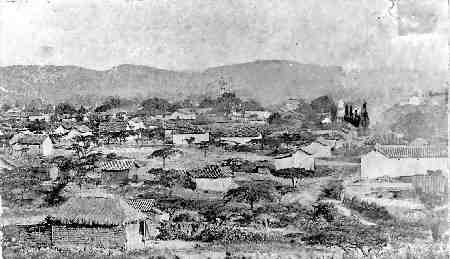
Cúcuta at 1900

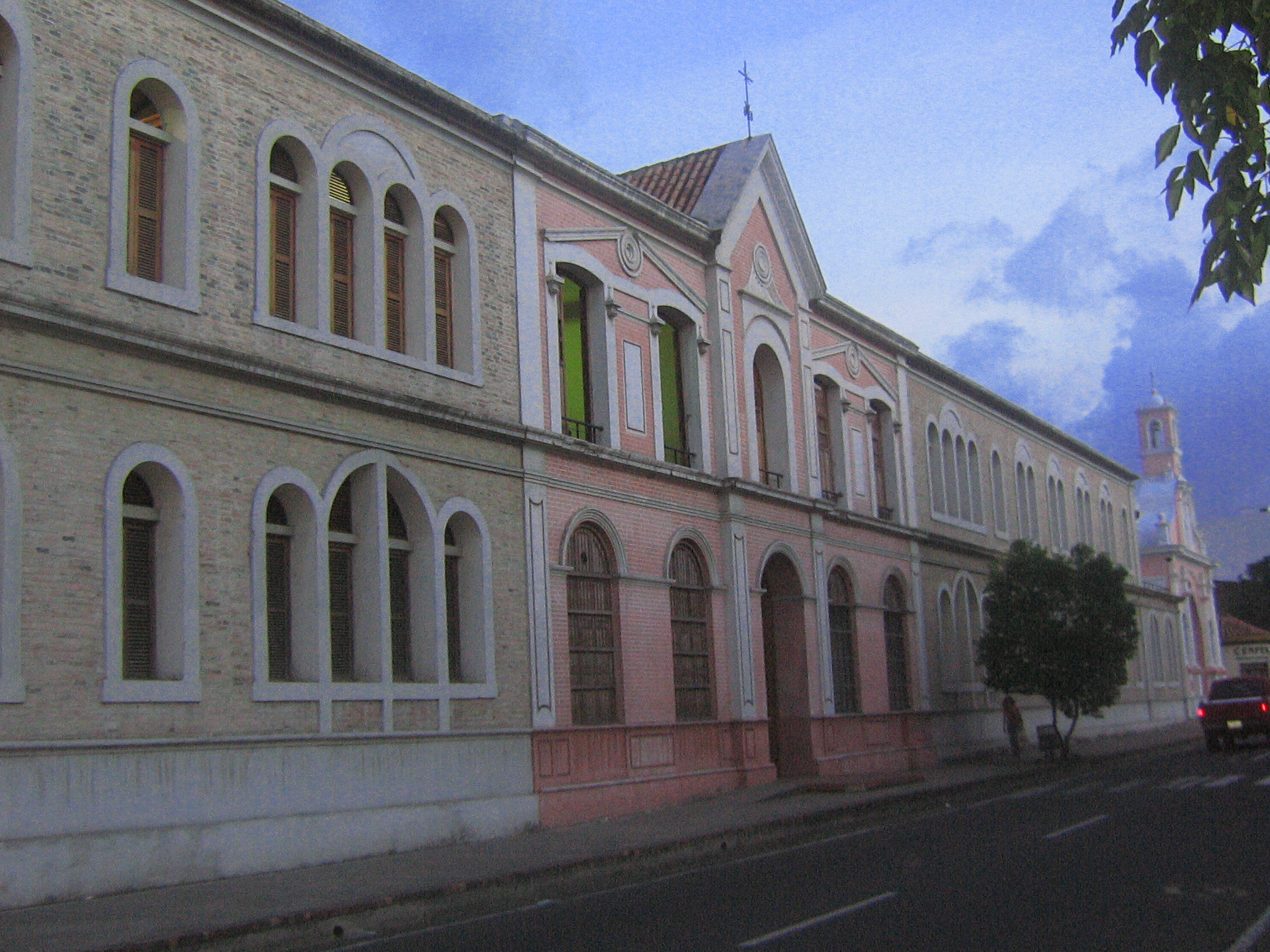
The Julio Pérez Ferrero Library, one of the oldest buildings of Cúcuta.

The 1875 Cúcuta earthquake (also known as earthquake of the Andes) occurred on 18 May at 11:15 AM. It completely demolished Cúcuta, Villa del Rosario (Colombia), San Antonio del Tachira and Capacho (Venezuela). The earthquake killed many Venezuelans in San Cristóbal, La Mulata, Rubio, Michelena, La Grita, Colón, amongst others, and was felt in both Bogotá and Caracas.

That day, the city of Cúcuta and the town of Villa del Rosario, in the Norte de Santander department (Colombia) and the municipalities of San Antonio del Táchira and Capacho, Táchira State (Venezuela) were destroyed totally by this catastrophic earthquake. Villa del Rosario was a historical and calm population. In 1821 had met in the main church (Historic church) to means to construct, the members of the First Congress of the Great Colombia, known as Congress of Cúcuta.

The ruins of the collapsed church can still be seen today. The houses of that time in the zone were of the purest Spanish colonial style.

== Geology ==
The earthquake occurred in the Mérida Andes and scientists proposed it was associated with rupture on the Aguas Calientes Fault System or faults in the Cucuta graben. The Aguas Calientes Fault System is a northwestern extension of the Boconó Fault. Paleoseismic studies of the Aguas Calientes Fault System at the presumed earthquake epicenter revealed evidence of recent surface rupture. The central part of the Aguas Calientes Fault System was the likely source of the event. Its moment magnitude is estimated at M_{w} 6.75.

== Death toll ==
The exact number of victims is not known; Spokane Daily Chronicle reported that the figure was as many as 2,500, while other sources say that the death toll was about 1,000. Early newspaper reports put the number at 8 to 10,000. The Evening Post wrote that 5,000 died outright with a further 9,000 dying from the after effects such as fever and lockjaw.

== Affected areas ==
The earthquake covered 5 degrees of Latitude and was 500 miles long. Populated areas affected were Villa of the Rosary, San Luis, Salazar, Woods of the Palms, Gramalote, Bochalema and San Faustino in Colombia. San Antonio, Capacho, San Cristóbal, the Mulata, Rubio, Michelena, La Grita, Colón in Venezuela. In addition it was also felt in Bogotá and Caracas.

== See also ==
- History of Colombia
- List of earthquakes in Colombia
- List of historical earthquakes
