= Lourdes, Norte de Santander =

Coordinates: 7°58′N 72°50′W

- Municipality and town
- Flag

- Location of the municipality and town of Lourdes, Norte de Santander in the Norte de Santander Department of Colombia.
- Country: Colombia
- Department: Norte de Santander Department
- Time zone: UTC-5 (Colombia Standard Time)

Lourdes (Spanish pronunciation: [ˈlowɾðes]) is a municipality in the department of North Santander in Colombia. It includes a town of the same name.
