= Historical Complex of the Great Convention =

Colonial building in Ocaña, Colombia

Coordinates: 8.2321°N 73.3551°W

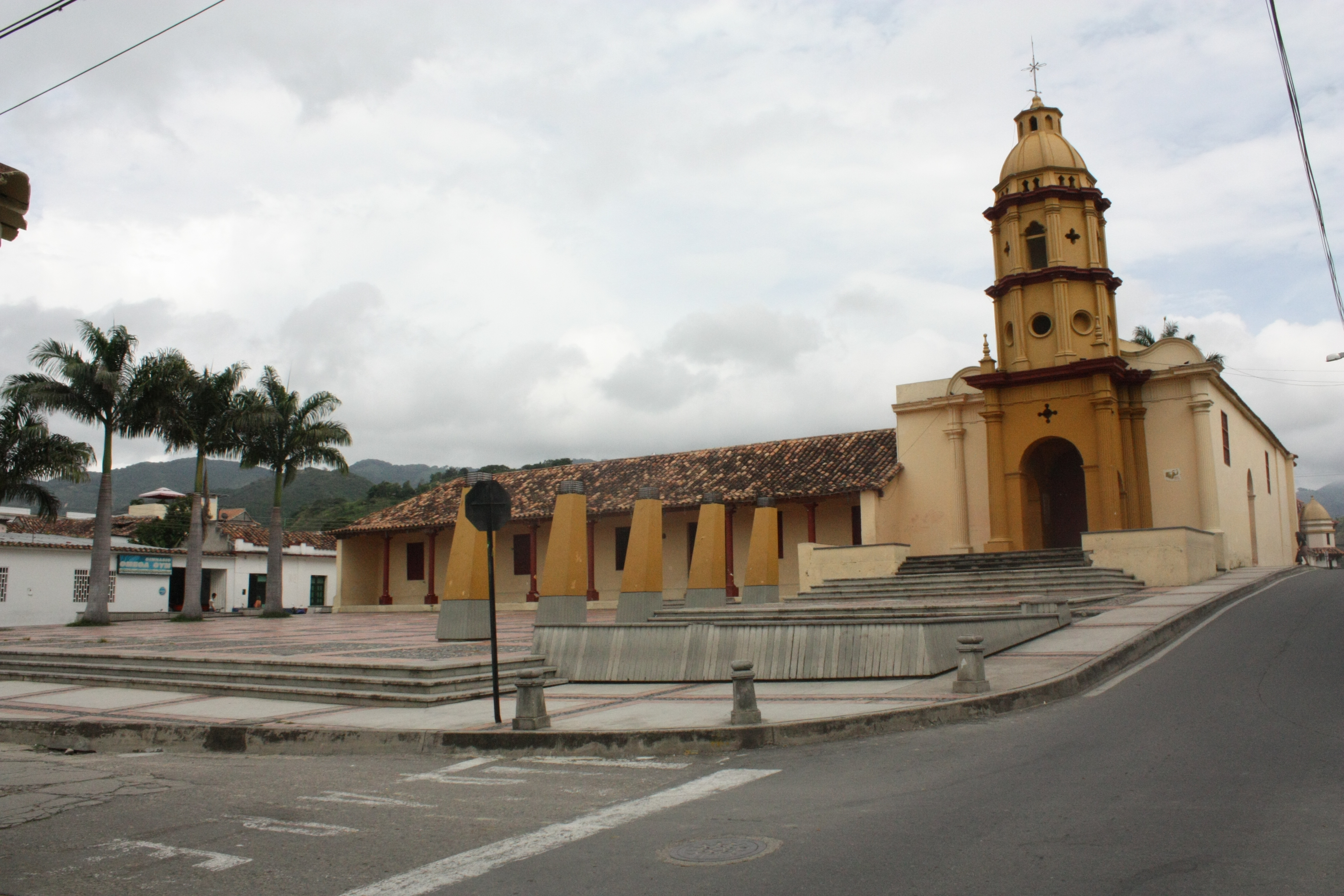

The Historical Complex of the Great Convention (Spanish: Complejo Histórico de la Gran Convención) is a colonial construction located in Ocaña, Colombia. It consists of the temple of San Francisco, the adjacent convent and the square of the Gran Convención. Its construction began in 1584 by the Franciscan religious order. The complex has a museum with historical artifacts. The Historical Complex is a property of cultural interest of national character.

== History ==
The construction of the building began in 1533 and took about 50 years to complete. The building is considered the first cloister in Ocaña of the Franciscan communities, whose objective was to evangelize the indigenous population of the area. The building was used for liturgical ceremonies as well as for the instruction of young people, mainly teaching grammar and rhetoric. On April 9, 1928, the convention was held at the temple. During the convention, after a religious ceremony, Francisco Soto made a speech that contained some criticisms of the government of Simón Bolívar. The purpose of the convention was to reform the 1821 Cúcuta Charter. In 1849, after liberal policies and the creation of the province of Ocaña, the convent was suppressed and the building was given to the municipality for educational purposes. The historic complex was declared a national heritage site in 1937. By means of Law 10 of 1977 issued by the National Government, a museum was created in the historical complex under the supervision of the Academy of History of Ocaña, after the law was issued, part of the building was remodeled and the objects of the Convention were recovered.

== Collections ==
The building contains artifacts from politicians who attended the 18th century convention. The museum documents the disagreements between supporters of Simón Bolívar and Francisco de Paula Santander. The building contains a historical archive, as well as collections of documents and books. The museum contains an oil painting of Barbara Vicenta Lemus Jácome, a woman who attended the Convention in 1828, which was restored by the painter José Miguel Navarro Soto, this painting is in the museum of the Historical Complex.
