= Mutiscua =

Coordinates: 7°20′N 72°43′W

- Municipality and town
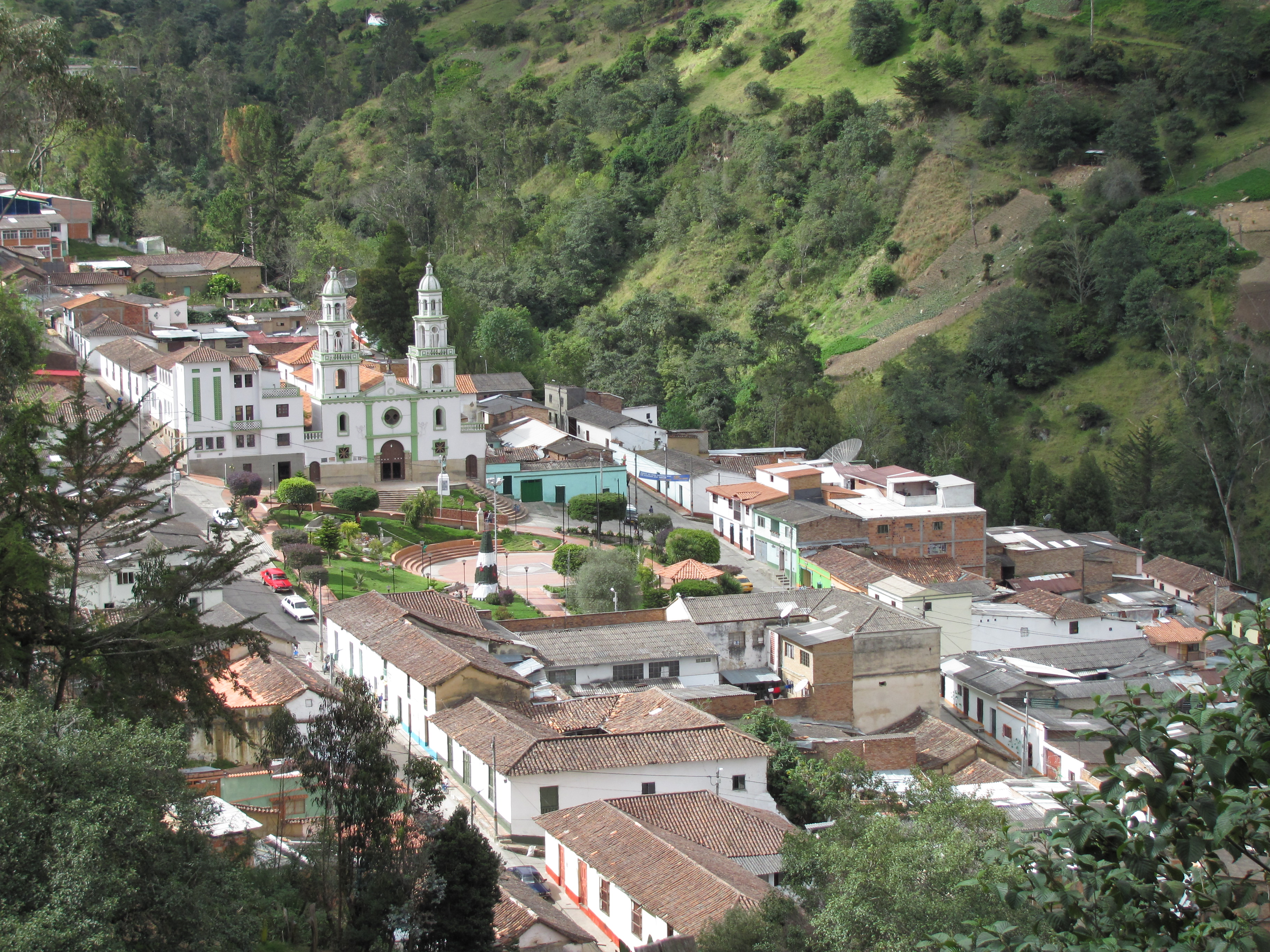
- View of Mutiscua

- Location of the municipality and town of Mutiscua in the Norte de Santander Department of Colombia.
- Country: Colombia
- Department: Norte de Santander Department

Area
  - Municipality and town: 159 km^{2} (61 sq mi)
- Elevation: 2,600 m (8,500 ft)

Population (2015)
  - Municipality and town: 3,759
  - Urban: 536
- Time zone: UTC-5 (Colombia Standard Time)

Mutiscua is a municipality in the department of North Santander in Colombia. It includes a town of the same name.
