= Los Estoraques Unique Natural Area =

National park in northeast Columbia

Área Natural Única Los Estoraques
- Los Estoraques Unique Natural Area
- IUCN category III (natural monument or feature)
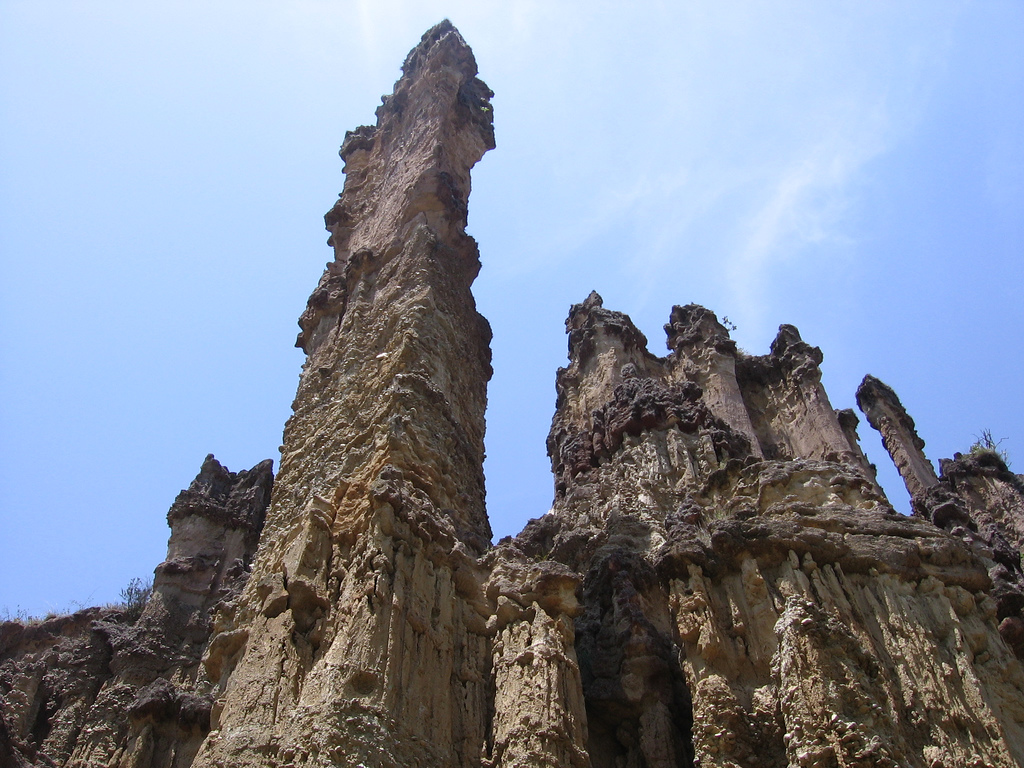
- Eroded rock columns that make up the area, found 200 meters from La Playa de Belén

- Location within Colombia
- Nearest city: Ocaña, Norte de Santander, Colombia
- Coordinates: 08°14′N 73°11′W
- Area: 562 km^{2} (217 sq mi)
- Established: 24 August 1988
- Governing body: SINAP

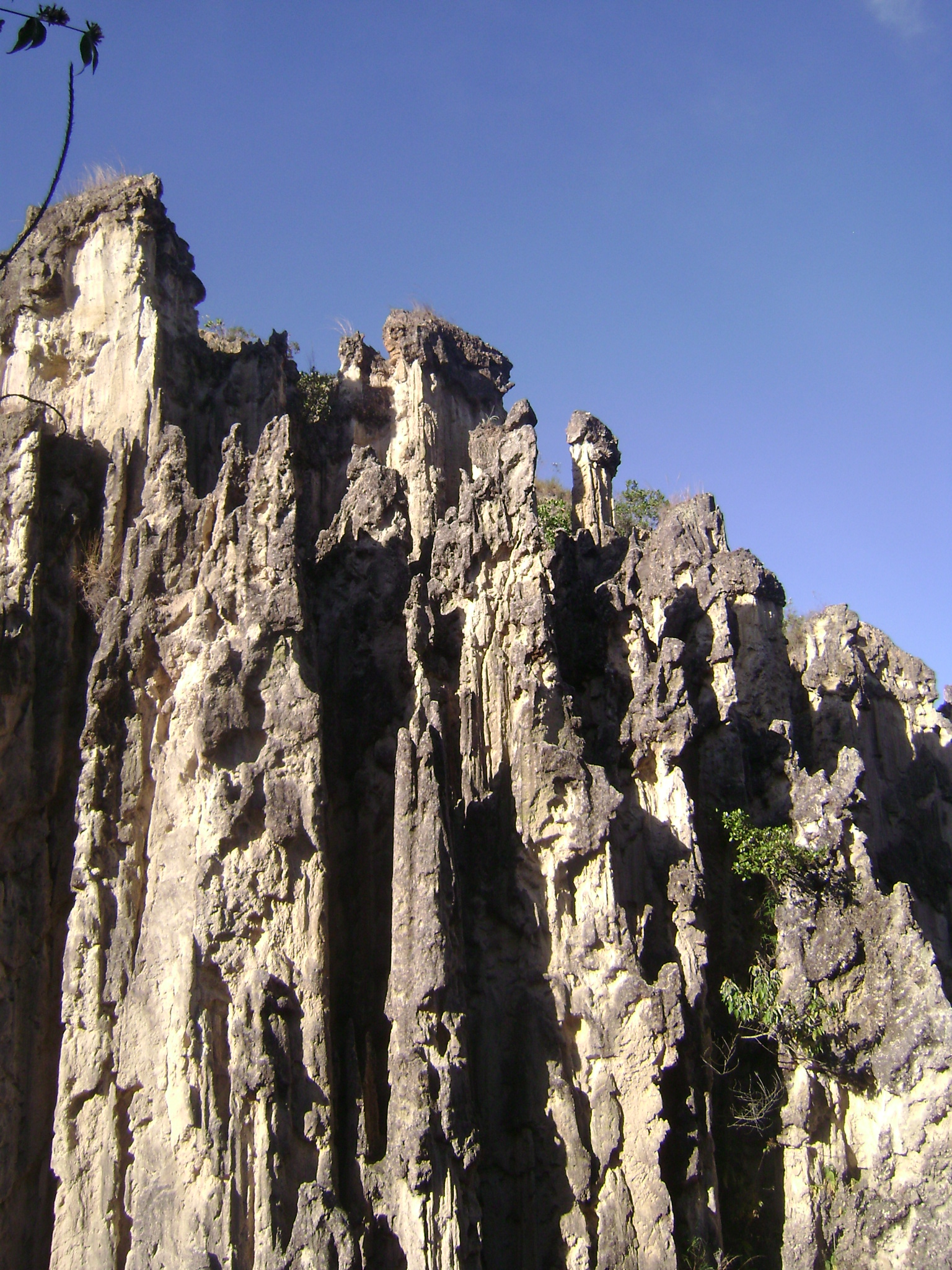
Estoraques in the Beach of Belén

The Los Estoraques Unique Natural Area (Spanish: Área Natural Única Los Estoraques) is one of the smaller national parks, covering only 6 km^{2} (2.3 sq mi), located in the Cordillera Oriental of Colombia in the Norte de Santander Department. The landscape is shaped by large brownstone pedestals and columns formed by thousands of years of erosion. The area is part of the Catatumbo River basin and elevation range from 1,450 to 1,900 meters above mean sea level. It was declared an Área Natural Única (Unique Natural Area) in 1998.

== Geography ==
The climate is warm and predominantly dry. The average temperature is 22 °C and the average yearly rainfall is 870 mm, with a dry season from January to March. The evapotranspiration is twice that of precipitation, causing a water deficit.

There are two types of plant life in the area, a dry forest with species such as Stachytarpheta mutabilis, Psidium guineense, Erythroxylum lucidum and Dodonaea viscosa and a sub-Andean forest covered in fog most time of the year with species such as Andean oak and horse-chestnut.

The fauna of the region is rich in species, many of them endemic and represented only by small populations which indicates a fragile ecosystem. Birds are the most numerous group of vertebrates, with 58 species in 50 different genus and 22 families. Hunting, deforestation, the introduction of agriculture and domestic animals have limited the number of species and number of individuals per species. Mammals found in the area include the tapeti, jaguarundi, crab-eating fox, and common opossum.

== Fauna ==
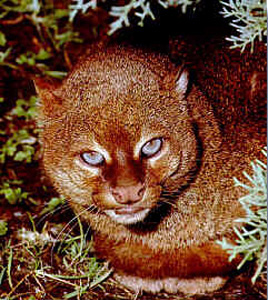
Yaguarundí

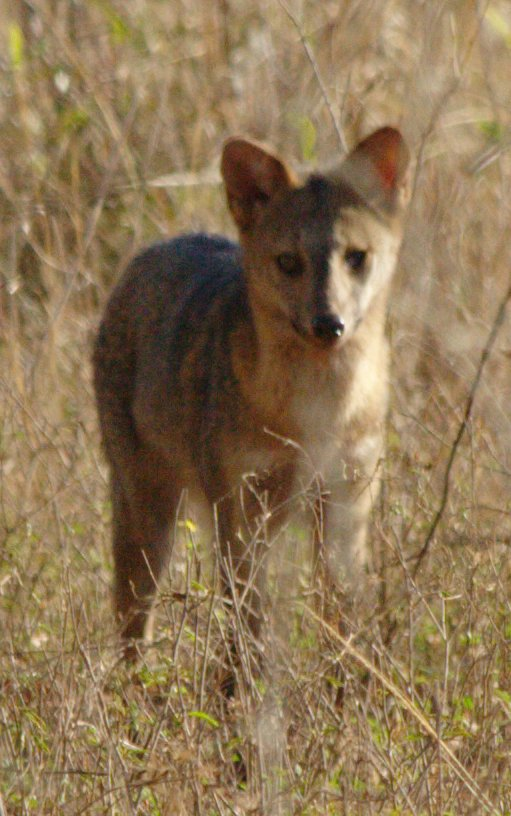
Zorro perruno

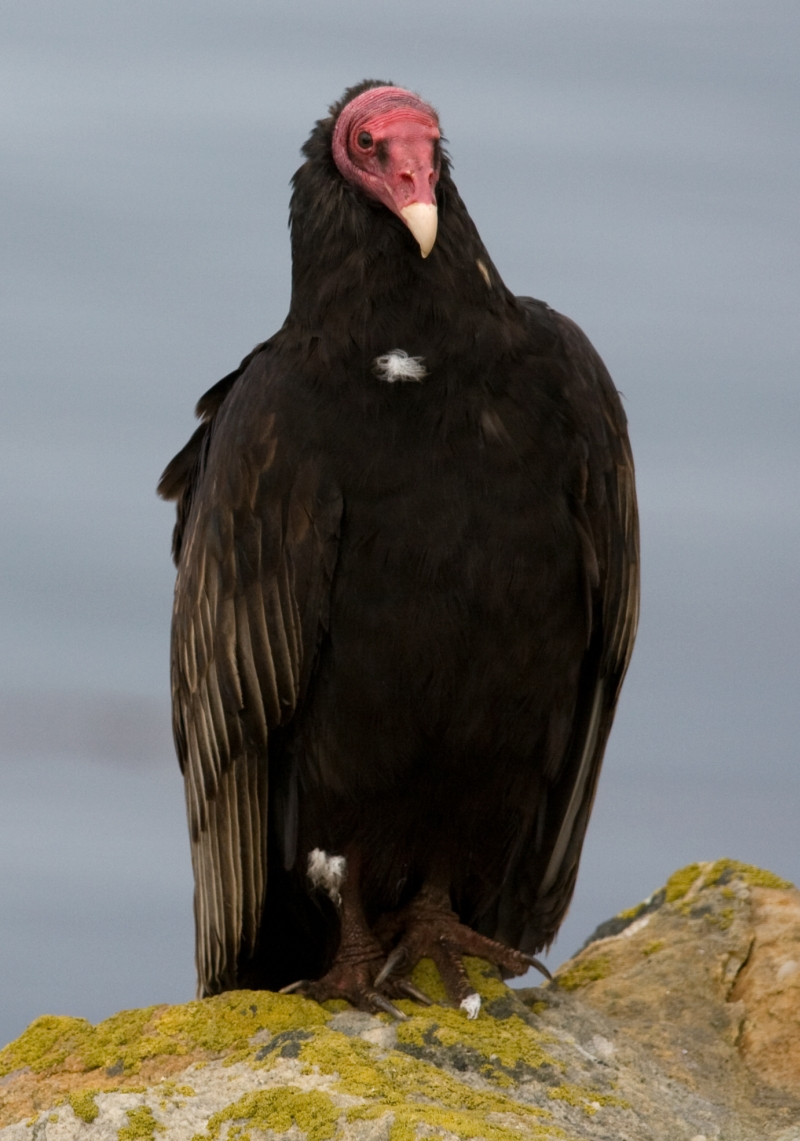
Guala cabecirroja

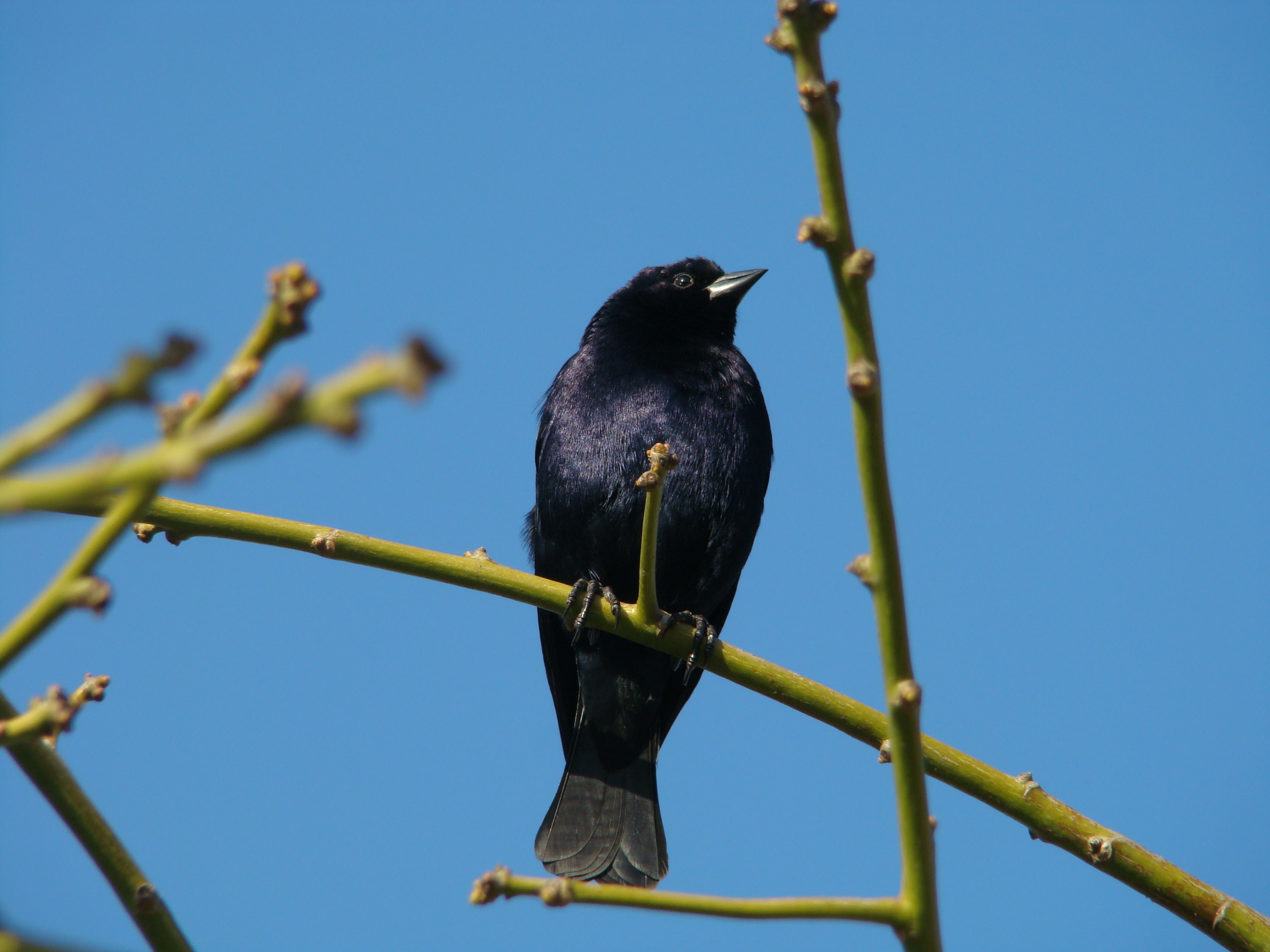
Tordo

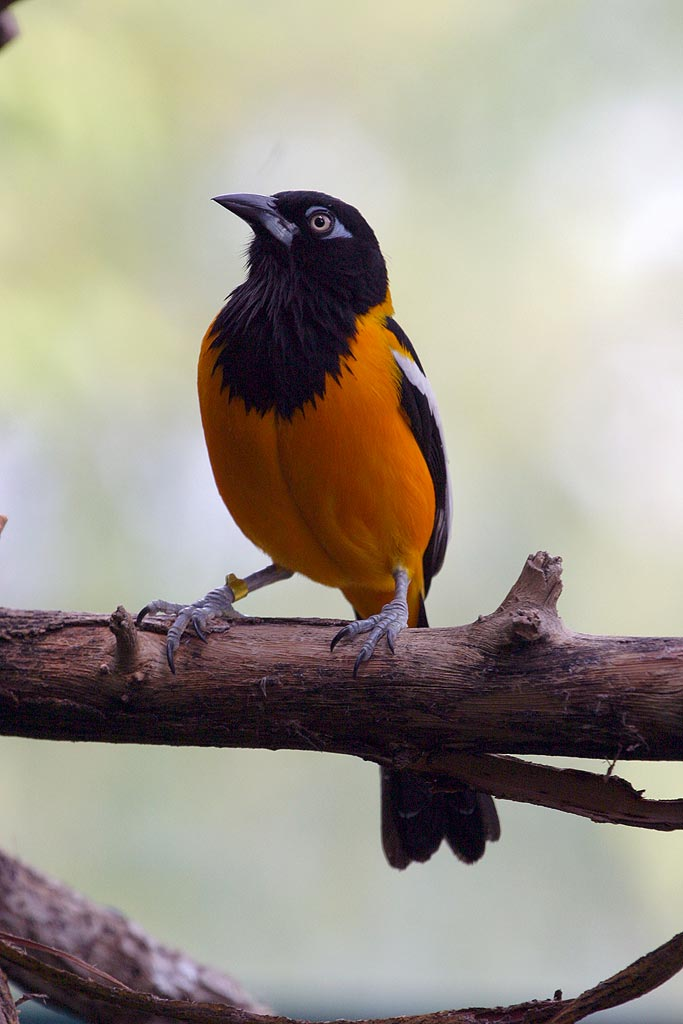
Turpial

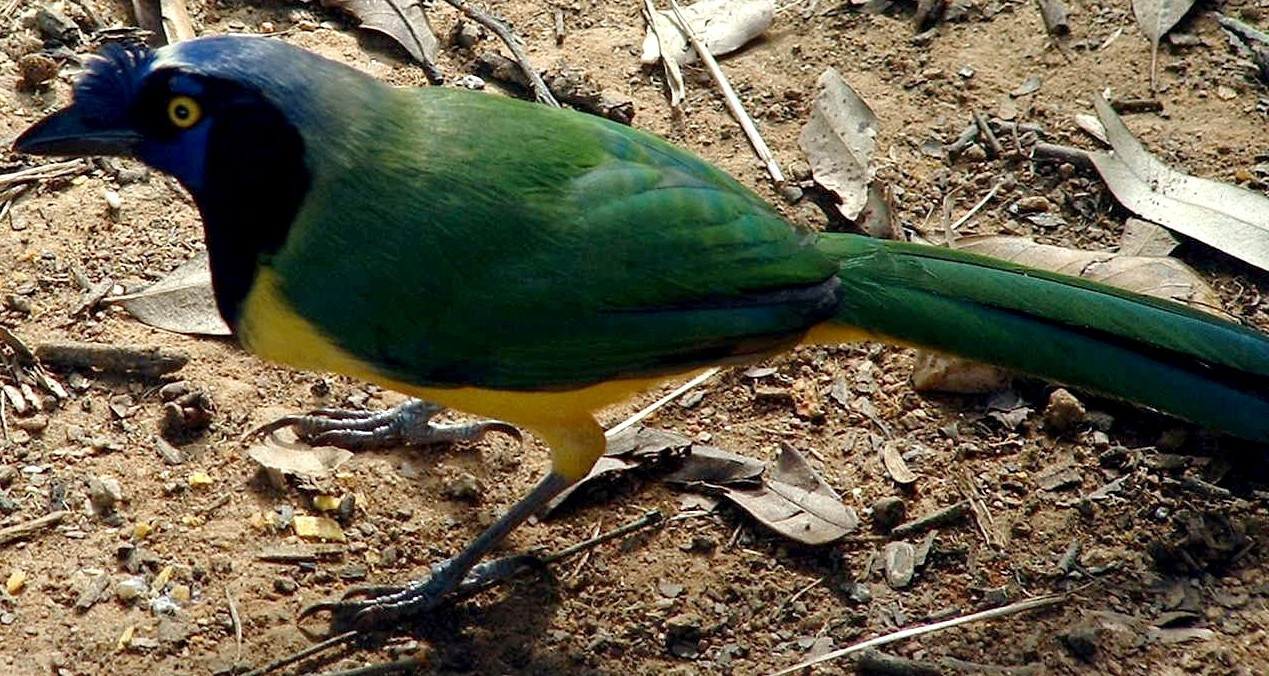
Carriqui

== Bibliography ==
- Villegas, Benjamin; Sesana, Laura (2007), Colombia Natural Parks, Villegas Asociados, ISBN 978-958-8156-87-3.
