= Villa Caro =

Coordinates: 7.91694°N 72.9764°W

- Municipality and town
- Flag

- Location of the municipality and town of Villa Caro in the Norte de Santander Department of Colombia.
- Country: Colombia
- Department: Norte de Santander Department

Area
  - Municipality and town: 402 km^{2} (155 sq mi)
- Elevation: 1,600 m (5,200 ft)

Population (2015)
  - Municipality and town: 5,192
  - Urban: 1,961
- Time zone: UTC-5 (Colombia Standard Time)

Villa Caro is a municipality in the department of North Santander in Colombia. It includes a town of the same name.
