= Cácota =

Coordinates: 7°16′N 72°39′W

- Municipality and town
- Flag

- Location of the municipality and town of Cácota in the Norte de Santander Department of Colombia.
- Country: Colombia
- Department: Norte de Santander Department

Area
  - Municipality and town: 139.84 km^{2} (53.99 sq mi)
- Elevation: 2,465 m (8,087 ft)

Population (2015)
  - Municipality and town: 1,925
  - Urban: 563
- Time zone: UTC-5 (Colombia Standard Time)
- Climate: Cfb

Cácota is a municipality in the department of North Santander in Colombia. It includes a town of the same name.
