= La Esperanza, Norte de Santander =

Coordinates: 7.63917°N 73.3358°W

- Municipality and town
- Flag

- Location of the municipality and town of La Esperanza, Norte de Santander in the Norte de Santander Department of Colombia.
- Country: Colombia
- Department: Norte de Santander Department

Area
  - Total: 665 km^{2} (257 sq mi)
- Elevation: 1,566 m (5,138 ft)

Population (Census 2018)
  - Total: 11,040
  - Density: 16.6/km^{2} (43.0/sq mi)
- Time zone: UTC-5 (Colombia Standard Time)
- Website: www.laesperanza-nortedesantander.gov.co

La Esperanza (Spanish pronunciation: [la espeˈɾansa]) is a Colombian municipality and town located in the department of North Santander.
