= Cucutilla =

Coordinates: 7°33′N 72°47′W

- Municipality and town
- Flag Coat of arms

- Location of the municipality and town of Cucutilla in the Norte de Santander Department of Colombia.
- Country: Colombia
- Department: Norte de Santander Department

Area
  - Municipality and town: 372 km^{2} (144 sq mi)
- Elevation: 1,277 m (4,190 ft)

Population (2015)
  - Municipality and town: 7,686
  - Urban: 1,224
- Time zone: UTC-5 (Colombia Standard Time)
- Climate: Af

Cucutilla is a municipality in the department of North Santander in Colombia. It includes a town of the same name.
