= Cáchira =

- Municipality and town
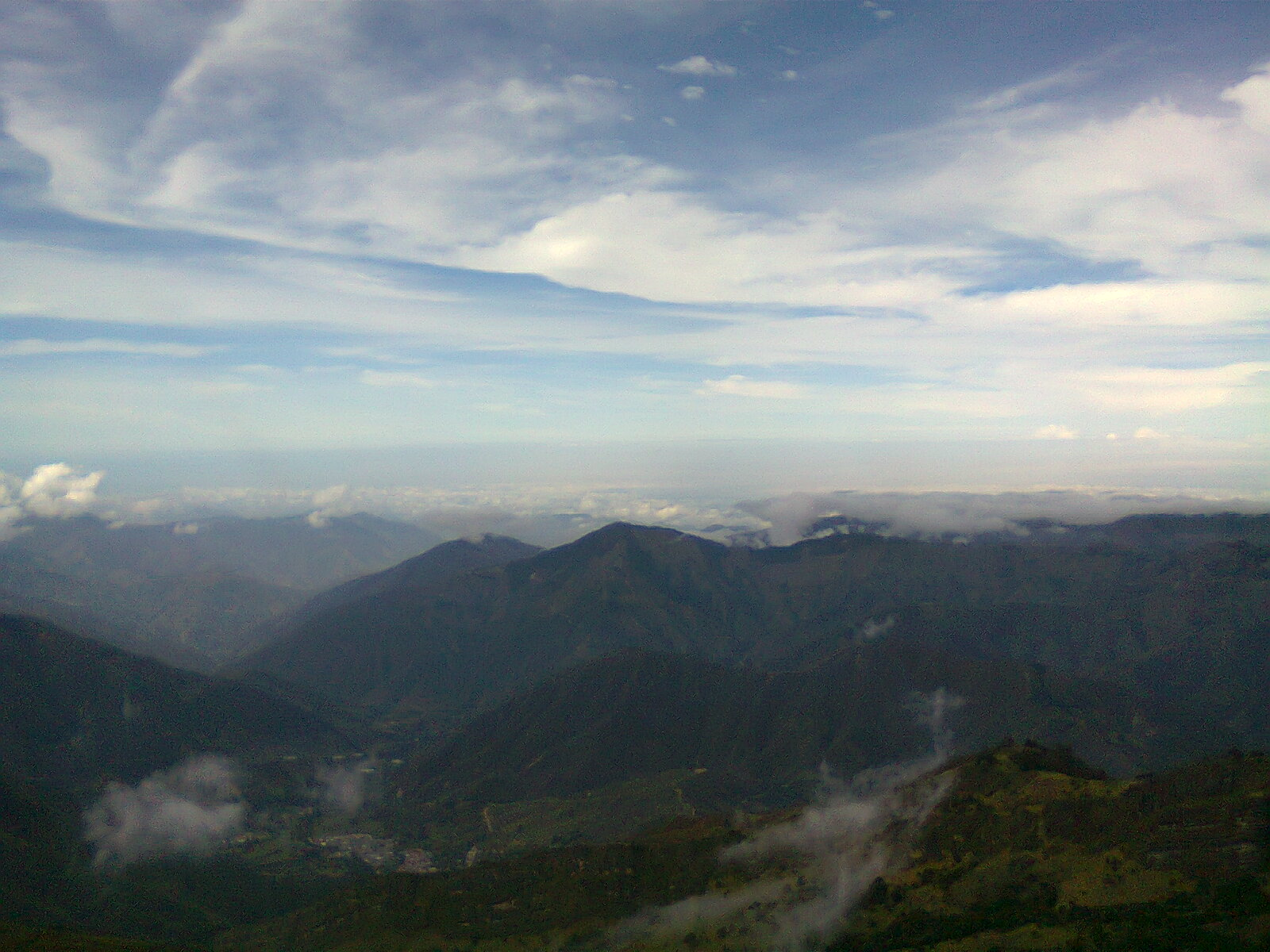
- View of Cáchira and surrounding mountains

- Flag

- Location of Cáchira in Norte de Santander

- Location of Cáchira in Colombia
- Coordinates: 7°45′N 73°10′W
- Country: Colombia
- Department: Norte de Santander Department
- Subregion: Western
- Founded: 7 March 1811

Government
  - Mayor: Henry Augusto Reyes Acevedo (2016-2019)

Area
  - Municipality and town: 605.94 km^{2} (233.95 sq mi)
- Elevation: 2,025 m (6,644 ft)

Population (2015)
  - Municipality and town: 10,970
  - Density: 18.10/km^{2} (46.89/sq mi)
  - Urban: 1,700
- Time zone: UTC-5 (Colombia Standard Time)
- Climate: Cfb
- Website: Official website

Cáchira is a Colombian municipality located in the department of Norte de Santander. The urban centre is situated at an altitude of 2,025 metres (6,644 ft) in the Eastern Ranges of the Colombian Andes.

== Climate ==
Climate data for Cáchira (Esc Agr Cachira), elevation 1,882 m (6,175 ft), (1981–2010)
Month	Jan	Feb	Mar	Apr	May	Jun	Jul	Aug	Sep	Oct	Nov	Dec	Year
Mean daily maximum °C (°F)	22.4 (72.3)	22.8 (73.0)	22.6 (72.7)	22.3 (72.1)	22.3 (72.1)	22.3 (72.1)	22.3 (72.1)	22.5 (72.5)	22.0 (71.6)	21.5 (70.7)	21.4 (70.5)	22.0 (71.6)	22.2 (72.0)
Daily mean °C (°F)	16.3 (61.3)	16.8 (62.2)	17.1 (62.8)	17.3 (63.1)	17.5 (63.5)	17.5 (63.5)	17.2 (63.0)	17.2 (63.0)	16.9 (62.4)	16.8 (62.2)	16.7 (62.1)	16.5 (61.7)	17.0 (62.6)
Mean daily minimum °C (°F)	10.5 (50.9)	11.1 (52.0)	11.7 (53.1)	13.0 (55.4)	13.4 (56.1)	13.2 (55.8)	12.7 (54.9)	12.6 (54.7)	12.6 (54.7)	12.9 (55.2)	12.5 (54.5)	11.3 (52.3)	12.3 (54.1)
Average precipitation mm (inches)	26.1 (1.03)	32.4 (1.28)	58.1 (2.29)	105.6 (4.16)	123.1 (4.85)	60.0 (2.36)	53.5 (2.11)	73.6 (2.90)	140.9 (5.55)	167.0 (6.57)	109.2 (4.30)	39.7 (1.56)	989.2 (38.94)
Average precipitation days	7	8	11	17	18	14	14	16	19	21	17	10	172
Average relative humidity (%)	83	82	84	87	87	86	84	85	87	89	89	86	86
Mean monthly sunshine hours	213.9	177.8	158.1	117.0	111.6	117.0	130.2	130.2	111.0	120.9	144.0	195.3	1,727
Mean daily sunshine hours	6.9	6.3	5.1	3.9	3.6	3.9	4.2	4.2	3.7	3.9	4.8	6.3	4.7
Source: Instituto de Hidrologia Meteorologia y Estudios Ambientales

== Gallery ==
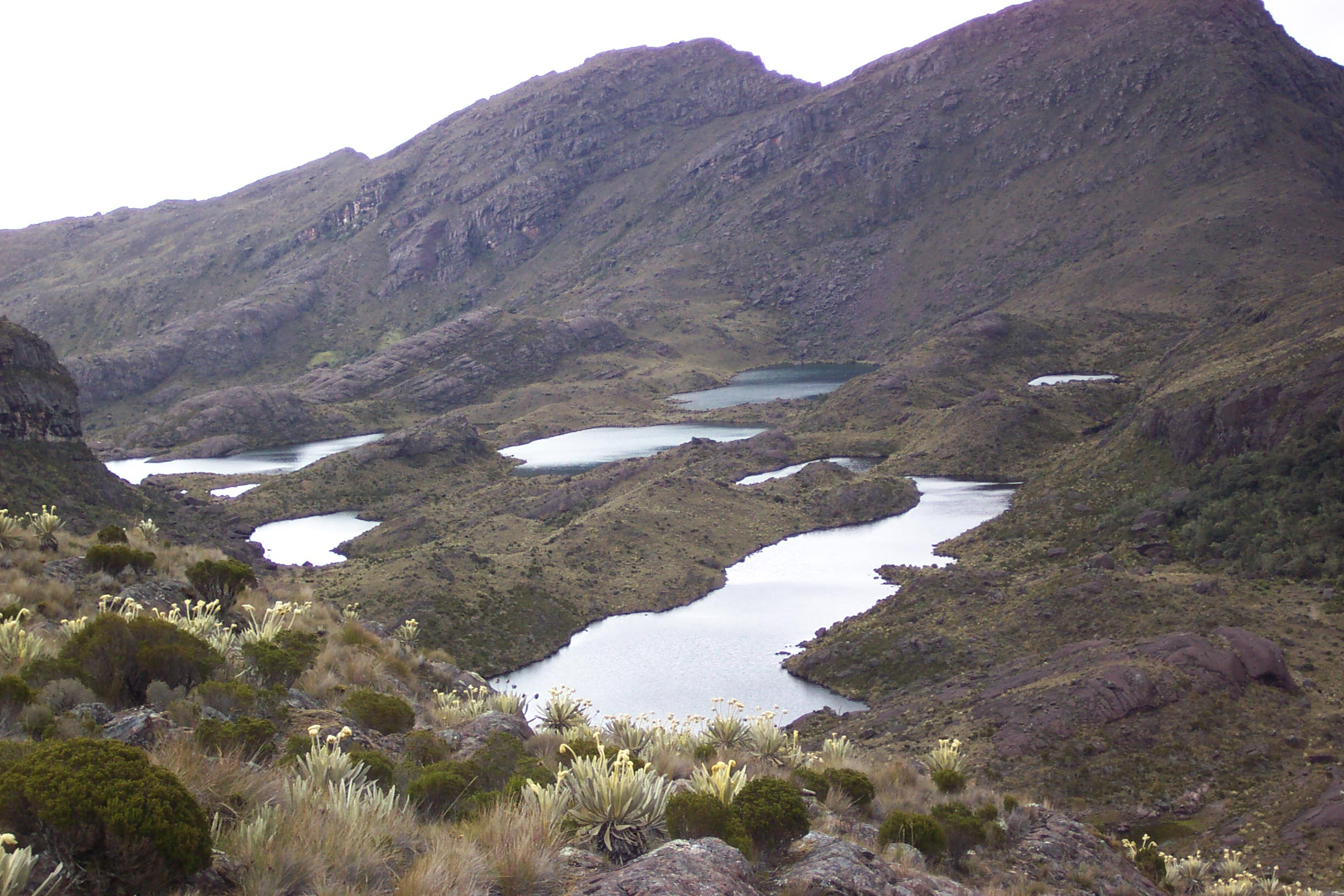
Siete Lagunas ("Seven Lakes") on Cáchira's páramo

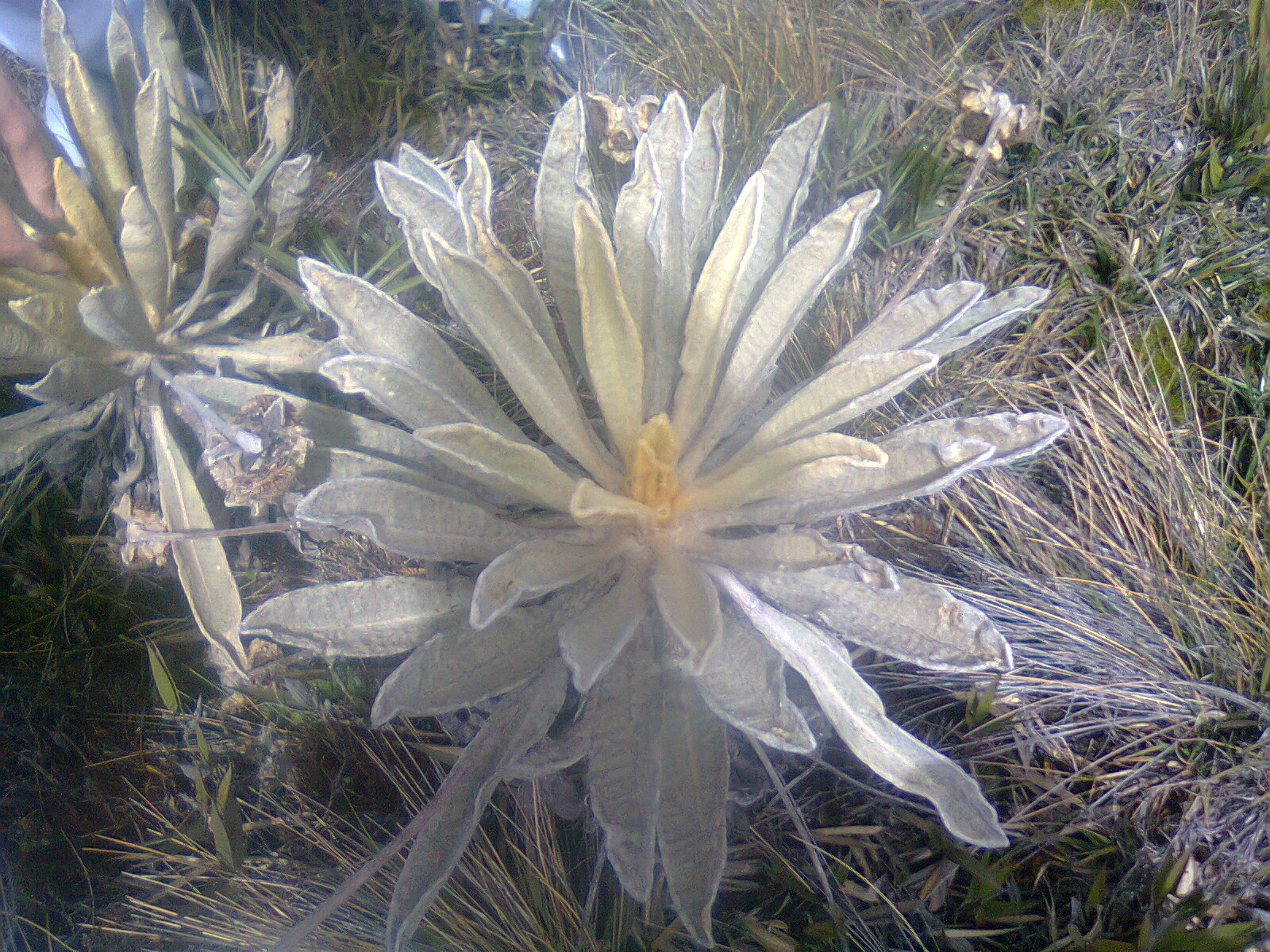
Espeletia schultzii on Cáchira's páramo
