= Silos, Norte de Santander =

Coordinates: 7°12′N 72°46′W

- Municipality and town
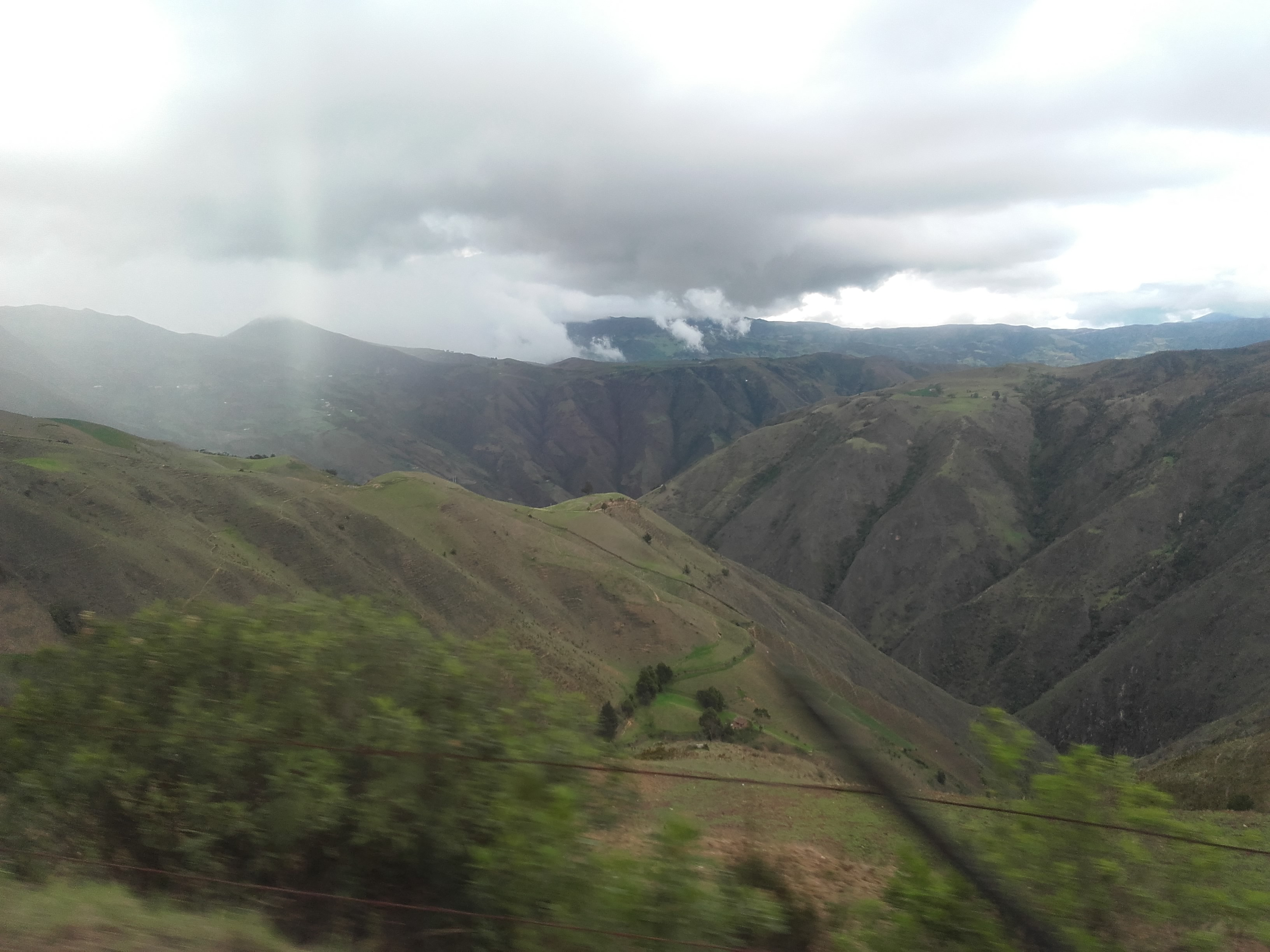

- Flag

- Location of the municipality and town of Silos, Norte de Santander in the Norte de Santander Department of Colombia.
- Country: Colombia
- Department: Norte de Santander Department
- Elevation: 2,845 m (9,334 ft)
- Time zone: UTC-5 (Colombia Standard Time)

Silos or Santo Domingo de Silos is a Colombian municipality and town located in the department of North Santander.

It is the only municipality founded in Colombia by a German, Ambrosio Alfinger, in 1531.

== Climate ==
Climate data for Silos, elevation 2,765 m (9,072 ft), (1981–2010)
Month	Jan	Feb	Mar	Apr	May	Jun	Jul	Aug	Sep	Oct	Nov	Dec	Year
Mean daily maximum °C (°F)	18.7 (65.7)	19.2 (66.6)	19.0 (66.2)	18.2 (64.8)	17.8 (64.0)	17.1 (62.8)	16.9 (62.4)	17.3 (63.1)	17.7 (63.9)	17.8 (64.0)	17.8 (64.0)	18.0 (64.4)	18.0 (64.4)
Daily mean °C (°F)	11.9 (53.4)	12.2 (54.0)	12.5 (54.5)	12.5 (54.5)	12.5 (54.5)	12.0 (53.6)	11.8 (53.2)	12.0 (53.6)	12.2 (54.0)	12.3 (54.1)	12.3 (54.1)	11.9 (53.4)	12.2 (54.0)
Mean daily minimum °C (°F)	5.8 (42.4)	6.3 (43.3)	7.0 (44.6)	7.8 (46.0)	8.1 (46.6)	7.8 (46.0)	7.6 (45.7)	7.5 (45.5)	7.5 (45.5)	7.7 (45.9)	7.3 (45.1)	6.5 (43.7)	7.3 (45.1)
Average precipitation mm (inches)	16.1 (0.63)	24.7 (0.97)	45.7 (1.80)	87.8 (3.46)	107.8 (4.24)	94.1 (3.70)	90.2 (3.55)	89.7 (3.53)	99.2 (3.91)	107.4 (4.23)	60.9 (2.40)	30.8 (1.21)	845.0 (33.27)
Average precipitation days	7	8	12	16	21	22	24	21	19	18	14	10	190
Average relative humidity (%)	75	76	79	83	84	84	84	83	82	83	81	78	81
Mean monthly sunshine hours	161.2	132.7	117.8	75.0	71.3	66.0	89.9	105.4	102.0	93.0	102.0	133.3	1,249.6
Mean daily sunshine hours	5.2	4.7	3.8	2.5	2.3	2.2	2.9	3.4	3.4	3.0	3.4	4.3	3.4
Source: Instituto de Hidrologia Meteorologia y Estudios Ambientales

== See also ==
- Santo Domingo de Silos, Spain
