= Bucarasica =

Coordinates: 8°03′N 72°52′W

- Municipality and town
- Flag

- Location of the municipality and town of Bucarasica in the Norte de Santander Department of Colombia.
- Country: Colombia
- Department: Norte de Santander Department

Area
  - Land: 267 km^{2} (103 sq mi)
- Elevation: 1,552 m (5,092 ft)

Population (2015)
  - Municipality and town: 4,570
  - Urban: 592
- Time zone: UTC-5 (Colombia Standard Time)
- Climate: Af

Bucarasica is a municipality in the department of North Santander in Colombia. It includes a town of the same name.
