= Labateca =

Coordinates: 7°20′N 72°30′W

- Municipality and town
- Flag

- Location of the municipality and town of Labateca in the Norte de Santander Department of Colombia.
- Country: Colombia
- Department: Norte de Santander Department

Area
  - Municipality and town: 253 km^{2} (98 sq mi)
- Elevation: 1,465 m (4,806 ft)

Population (2015)
  - Municipality and town: 5,867
  - Urban: 1,427
- Time zone: UTC-5 (Colombia Standard Time)

Labateca is a municipality in the department of North Santander in Colombia. It includes a town of the same name.
