= Pamplonita =

Coordinates: 7°30′N 72°35′W

- Municipality and town
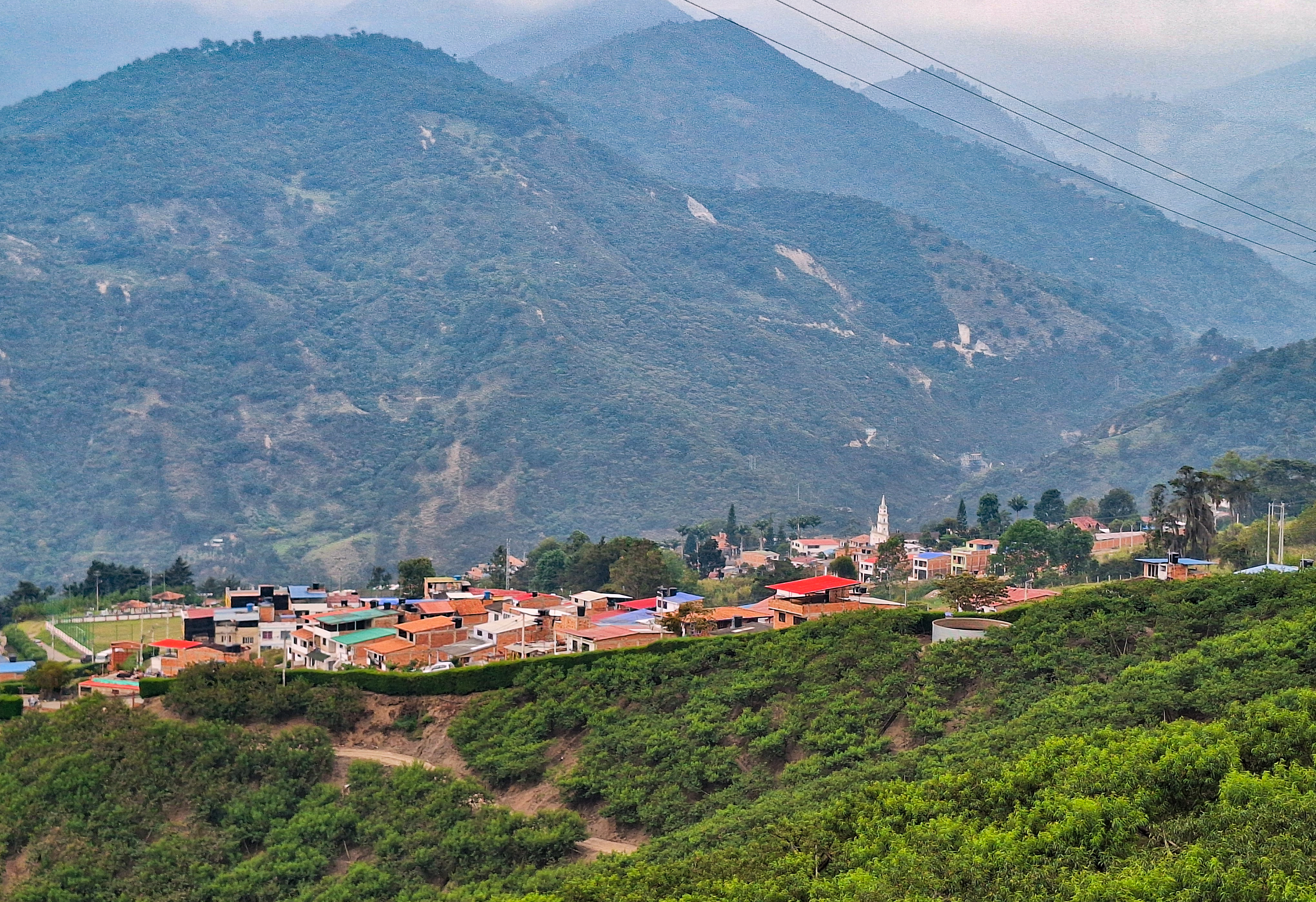

- Flag Coat of arms

- Location of the municipality and town of Pamplonita in the Norte de Santander Department of Colombia.
- Country: Colombia
- Department: Norte de Santander Department
- Established: 22-february,1550

Area
  - Municipality and town: 176 km^{2} (68 sq mi)
- Elevation: 1,886 m (6,188 ft)

Population (2015)
  - Municipality and town: 4,932
  - Urban: 900
- Time zone: UTC-5 (Colombia Standard Time)

Pamplonita is a municipality in the department of North Santander in Colombia. It includes a town of the same name.
