= San Calixto =

Coordinates: 8°24′N 73°13′W

- Municipality and town
- Flag

- Location of the municipality and town of San Calixto in the Norte de Santander Department of Colombia.
- Country: Colombia
- Department: Norte de Santander Department
- Elevation: 1,677 m (5,502 ft)

Population (Census 2018)
  - Total: 9,961
- Time zone: UTC-5 (Colombia Standard Time)

San Calixto (Spanish pronunciation: [saŋ kaˈliɣsto]) is a Colombian municipality located in the department of Norte de Santander.
