= Ábrego =

- Municipality

- Flag Coat of arms

- Location of Ábrego in Norte de Santander

- Location of Ábrego in Colombia
- Coordinates: 8°00′N 73°12′W
- Country: Colombia
- Department: Norte de Santander
- Subregion: Western
- Founded: 12 March 1810

Government
  - Mayor: Juan Carlos Jácome Ropero (2020-2023)

Area
  - Total: 1,582 km^{2} (611 sq mi)
- Elevation: 1,398 m (4,587 ft)

Population (2015)
  - Total: 38,627
  - Density: 24.42/km^{2} (63.24/sq mi)
- Time zone: UTC-5 (Colombia Standard Time)
- Climate: Aw
- Website: Official website

Ábrego (Spanish pronunciation: [ˈaβɾeɣo]) is a Colombian municipality and town located in the department of Norte de Santander. The urban centre is situated at an altitude of 1,398 metres (4,587 ft) in the Eastern Ranges of the Colombian Andes.

== History ==
Various indigenous communities, such as the Oroques, Turmeros, Seborucos, and Carasicas, inhabited the territory. The first denomination of this place was Llano de los Orejones in 1530 by Ambrosio Alfínger's troops. On July 26, 1580, a wooden cross was erected in the middle of the valley of this municipality for the first Eucharist. From that moment, the place began to be called "Llanos de la Cruz". The settlement of the municipality began when the sisters Ana María and Josefa de la Encarnación Maldonado Quintero donated several lands to raise the municipality's population; from that moment, they began to build streets and squares. March 12, 1810, is the date of the municipality's founding. On April 14, 1930, by ordinance number 32, the name of the municipality was changed to Abrego to honor the nortesantadereana woman who is considered a heroine in the department, Mercedes Abrego de Reyes.

== Geography ==
About 3 hectares of the municipality are located in the Santurbán moor, which is a water source for the departments of Norte de Santander and Santander. Part of the municipality is located in a valley between the Oroque and Frío rivers.

== Climate ==
Climate data for Ábrego
Month	Jan	Feb	Mar	Apr	May	Jun	Jul	Aug	Sep	Oct	Nov	Dec	Year
Mean daily maximum °C (°F)	26.6 (79.9)	27.2 (81.0)	27.6 (81.7)	27.2 (81.0)	27.1 (80.8)	27.3 (81.1)	27.6 (81.7)	27.8 (82.0)	27.1 (80.8)	26.6 (79.9)	26.2 (79.2)	26.1 (79.0)	27.1 (80.8)
Daily mean °C (°F)	20.1 (68.2)	20.5 (68.9)	21.0 (69.8)	21.2 (70.2)	21.3 (70.3)	21.3 (70.3)	21.3 (70.3)	21.3 (70.3)	21.0 (69.8)	20.9 (69.6)	20.7 (69.3)	20.3 (68.5)	20.9 (69.6)
Mean daily minimum °C (°F)	12.3 (54.1)	12.7 (54.9)	13.4 (56.1)	14.5 (58.1)	14.8 (58.6)	14.1 (57.4)	13.5 (56.3)	13.7 (56.7)	14.3 (57.7)	14.3 (57.7)	14.1 (57.4)	13.1 (55.6)	13.7 (56.7)
Average precipitation mm (inches)	9.5 (0.37)	19.1 (0.75)	28.9 (1.14)	110.7 (4.36)	170.1 (6.70)	96.0 (3.78)	87.4 (3.44)	144.7 (5.70)	210.1 (8.27)	165.8 (6.53)	76.9 (3.03)	23.6 (0.93)	1,142.8 (44.99)
Average precipitation days	3	4	6	12	18	12	12	16	20	19	13	5	133
Average relative humidity (%)	80	79	79	81	83	81	78	78	81	83	83	83	81
Mean monthly sunshine hours	217.0	175.0	170.5	135.0	145.7	165.0	189.1	173.6	144.0	145.7	156.0	189.1	2,005.7
Mean daily sunshine hours	7.0	6.2	5.5	4.5	4.7	5.5	6.1	5.6	4.8	4.7	5.2	6.1	5.5
Source: Instituto de Hidrologia Meteorologia y Estudios Ambientales

== Economy ==
The economy of the municipality is primarily centered around agriculture. The main crop grown is onions, with other products including tomatoes, cocoa, coffee, corn, beans, sugar cane, and tobacco.

As of 2017, there were 677 commercial establishments in the municipality, including clothing stores, hairdressers, cafes, and bakeries.

== Heritage Sites ==
Ábrego has several temples, such as the Parish of Santa Bárbara, which is the first hermitage of the town completed in 1765, which was founded by Juan Quintero Príncipe and Cristóbal Arévalo. It became a parish on September 5, 1807, in which José María Fernández Carvajalino was the first parish priest. On December 31, 2003, by decree 1144, the church is considered a property of cultural interest of departmental character. Another temple in the municipality is the Divino Niño Church, which it was created by the parish priest Diógenes Sanabria, in 2009, the building was consecrated.

Another tourist attraction is the Pozo del Burro (lit. 'The Donkey's Well'), in which according to a local legend, a traveler was traveling through this place with his donkey carrying gold, but he drowned in the river. In addition to Piedras Negras (lit. 'Black Stones'), which are a pile of stones scattered over approximately 3 hectares. Some theories suggest that they are of volcanic origin or that they are fragments of an asteroid, there is also an oral tradition that says that they were used by the Orokes for rituals in the nular phase.

== Natural Reserves ==
One of the natural reserves of Ábrego is the Juridiscciones Moor has about 2800 hectares, specifically in the Pan de Azúcar Lagoon, where the Oroque and Frío rivers are born, which form the Algodonal river. In December 2014, the Juridiscciones, Santurbán and Berlín Moors were delimited by resolution 2090, in this moor complex there are several lagoon, which are water sources for several municipalities of Norte de Santander, including Ábrego.

== Education ==
The first educational establishments in the municipality date back to 1844. The municipality has a mega school called Carlo Julio Torrado Peñaranda School which was inaugurated in 2016, the mega school has three computer rooms, physics, chemistry and biology laboratories, also in 2016, the school had 1600 primary and high school students studying in it. The municipality also has another school called Institución Educativa Colegio Santa Barbara, founded in 1966. In 2016, the 50th anniversary of the institution was celebrated in the main park of the municipality.
