= Hacarí =

Coordinates: 8°19′N 73°09′W

- Municipality and town
- Flag

- Location of the municipality and town of Hacarí in the Norte de Santander department of Colombia.
- Country: Colombia
- Department: Norte de Santander Department

Area
  - Total: 597 km^{2} (231 sq mi)

Population (Census 2018)
  - Total: 9,745
  - Density: 16.3/km^{2} (42.3/sq mi)
- Time zone: UTC-5 (Colombia Standard Time)
- Website: http://hacari-nortedesantander.gov.co/

Hacarí (Spanish pronunciation: [akaˈɾi]) is a Colombian municipality located in the department of North Santander.
