= Arboledas =

Coordinates: 7°40′N 72°45′W

- Municipality
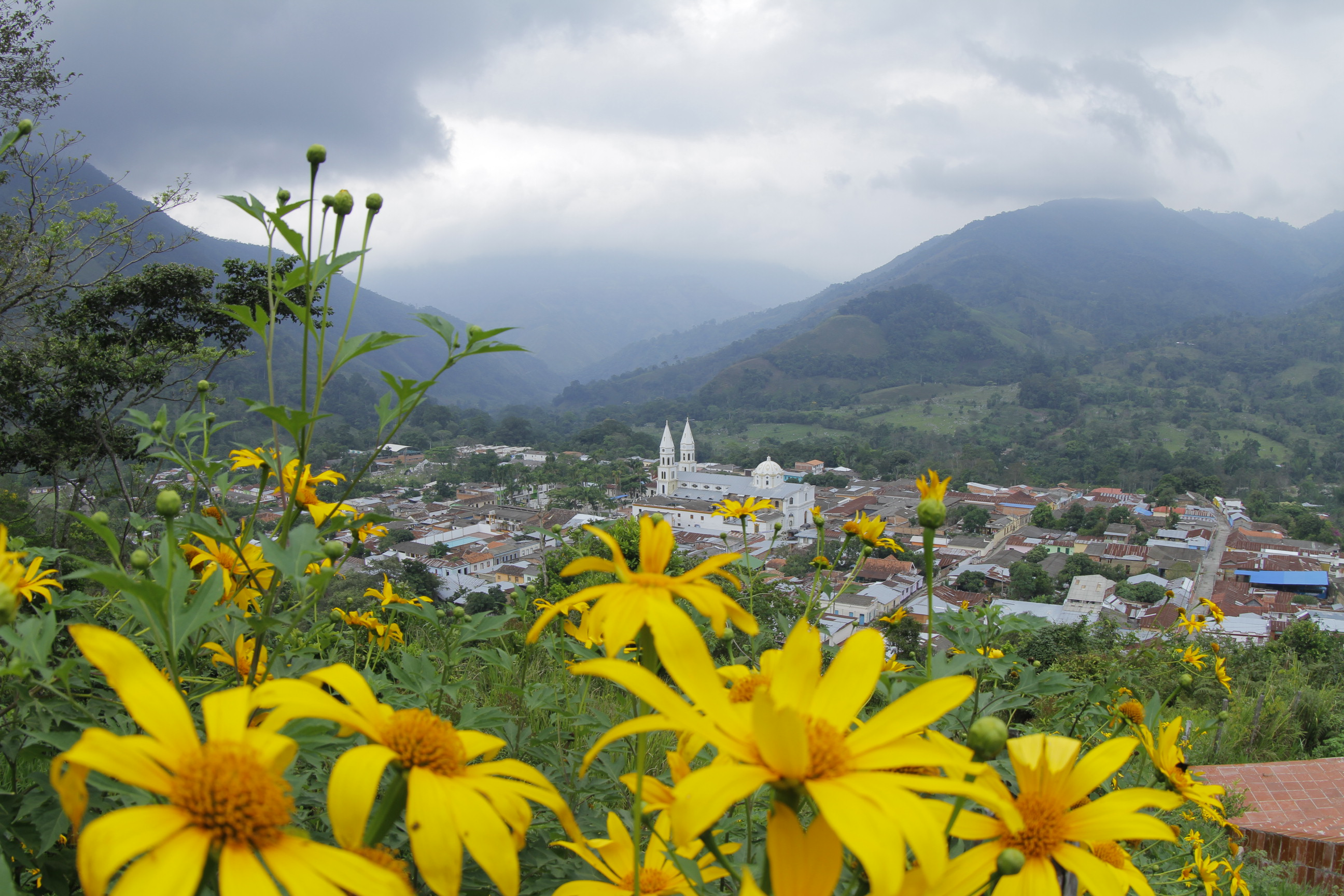

- Flag

- Location of the municipality of Arboledas in North of Santander.

- Location in Colombia
- Country: Colombia
- Department: North of Santander
- Elevation: 946 m (3,104 ft)

Population (2015)
  - Total: 8,984
- Time zone: UTC-5 (Colombia Standard Time)
- Climate: Af

Arboledas (Spanish pronunciation: [aɾβoˈleðas]) is a municipality in the department of North Santander in Colombia. It includes a town of the same name.
