= Herrán, Norte de Santander =

Coordinates: 7°31′N 72°29′W

Herrán
- Municipality and town
- Flag

- Location of the municipality and town of Herrán in the Norte de Santander Department of Colombia.
- Country: Colombia
- Department: Norte de Santander Department
- Time zone: UTC-5 (Colombia Standard Time)

Herrán is a Colombian municipality and town located in the department of North Santander.

== Climate ==
Climate data for Herrán (Tama Parque Nal), elevation 2,500 m (8,200 ft), (1981–2010)
Month	Jan	Feb	Mar	Apr	May	Jun	Jul	Aug	Sep	Oct	Nov	Dec	Year
Mean daily maximum °C (°F)	18.8 (65.8)	18.4 (65.1)	18.5 (65.3)	18.8 (65.8)	18.6 (65.5)	17.9 (64.2)	17.5 (63.5)	18.2 (64.8)	18.7 (65.7)	18.8 (65.8)	18.6 (65.5)	18.3 (64.9)	18.4 (65.1)
Daily mean °C (°F)	13.1 (55.6)	13.3 (55.9)	13.8 (56.8)	14.2 (57.6)	14.2 (57.6)	13.8 (56.8)	13.5 (56.3)	13.8 (56.8)	13.9 (57.0)	13.8 (56.8)	13.8 (56.8)	13.5 (56.3)	13.7 (56.7)
Mean daily minimum °C (°F)	7.2 (45.0)	8.7 (47.7)	9.2 (48.6)	10.3 (50.5)	10.6 (51.1)	10.5 (50.9)	10.1 (50.2)	10.0 (50.0)	10.0 (50.0)	9.8 (49.6)	9.5 (49.1)	8.5 (47.3)	9.6 (49.3)
Average precipitation mm (inches)	36.3 (1.43)	52.8 (2.08)	63.5 (2.50)	133.5 (5.26)	169.2 (6.66)	195.9 (7.71)	199.3 (7.85)	186.4 (7.34)	194.9 (7.67)	194.1 (7.64)	127.9 (5.04)	76.0 (2.99)	1,593 (62.7)
Average precipitation days	9	12	12	18	22	23	26	25	22	22	20	13	217
Average relative humidity (%)	89	90	91	91	90	90	90	89	89	90	91	91	90
Mean monthly sunshine hours	145.7	115.7	117.8	81.0	71.3	72.0	89.9	93.0	90.0	89.9	96.0	105.4	1,167.7
Mean daily sunshine hours	4.7	4.1	3.8	2.7	2.3	2.4	2.9	3.0	3.0	2.9	3.2	3.4	3.2
Source: Instituto de Hidrologia Meteorologia y Estudios Ambientales
