= Gramalote =

Coordinates: 7°55′39″N 72°45′14″W

- town
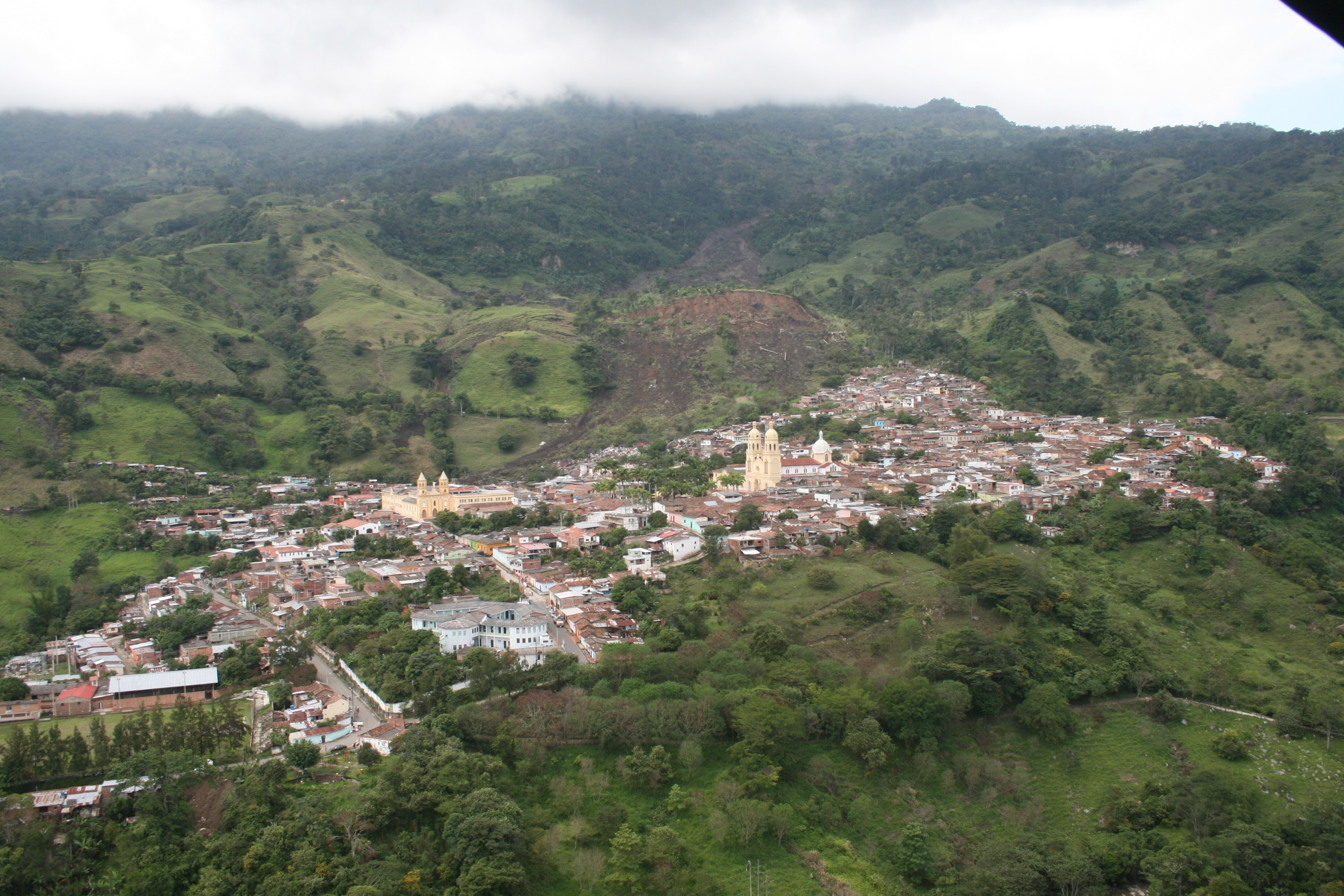
- Skyline of Gramalote

- Flag Coat of arms

- Map of Gramaote in the Norte de Santander Department.
- Country: Colombia
- Department: Norte de Santander
- Foundation: 1857

Government
  - Mayor: Angel Enrique Ibarra Montañéz

Area
  - Total: 151 km^{2} (58 sq mi)
- Elevation: 148 m (486 ft)

Population (2015)
  - Total: 5,567
- Time zone: UTC-5

Gramalote is a municipality in the department of North Santander in Colombia. It includes a town of the same name.

The complete destruction of the town is considered imminent due to massive mudslides brought about by unprecedented flooding that most of Colombia has undergone.

Its average temperature is 23 °C and its height of 1040 meters above sea level. Prior to the 2010 Colombian floods it had a population of 7853 inhabitants. It was founded twice, first in 1857, the second time in 1883, in less than a kilometer south of the original site.

== Economy ==
The municipality based its economy on the commercial exchange of agricultural producers, coffee, sugar cane, bananas, citrus, fruit and agricultural resources. As for the transition is important crops cultivation of beans. The exploitation of pastures livestock owners took over 50% of the municipal territory. The honey and other apiculture products are other sources of the population. The main formal employer was the State, through the various institutions that provided services in the municipality: Municipal Government, Judiciary, Police and Health sector, financial institutions and the educational sector which generated a total of approximately 230 jobs.

The income of the municipality's economy was distributed as follows: Coffee 50.54%, 32.49% Livestock, Panela 7.22%, 4.33% Bean, Banana 2.17%, 1.08% Citrus, Other fruit and vegetable 2.17%

== Festivities ==
Religious devoutness marks the character of the festivals of this county as in most of the Colombian people.

=== Holy Week ===
The events of Holy Week, from the Friday of Sorrows, Palm Sunday to Resurrection Sunday. Date: according to the Catholic calendar.

It consists of Santa Misa (Holy Mass), processions, Cross and representations. The brotherhood of Nazarene walks the streets where they spent the different steps and then loaded walk carefully arranged in the different steps that recall the life, passion, death and resurrection of Jesus Christ. These acts have the participation of the majority of the population, both urban and rural areas of the hull.

=== Feast of the patron. Our Lady of Mongui ===
To celebrate another year of the founding Gramalote, it was established by decree the feast of the Virgin of Mongui as a patron and protector of the gramaloteros.

==== History of the picture ====
King Charles V of Spain and Emperor of Germany, after a long reign withdrew to the Monastery of Yuste after his abdication in 1555 to prepare for his death. Was engaged to paint images of the Virgin Mary and Solicitor dressed in various costumes depending on various Spanish regions and send these canvases to the churches of the New World to spread devotion to the Mother of God. He painted the Madonna del Rosario trying to unite the mysteries of the Rosary with Christmas and it was an image of the Holy Family in their flight to Egypt. A San Jose accommodated him an Andalusian-style hat and a poncho winter. The virgin dressed as the peasant extremadura with gorgeous scarlet dress and a blue robe, sat wrapped in diapers to the baby Jesus for the journey across the desert. A copy of this image was brought from Spain to Pamplona by Bishop Jose Luis Boyacense Child, who ordered the priest to 1861 to Secundino Jacome, 50-year-old son and natural Simón Bolívar. Gave him the painting of Our Lady of Mongui and appointed him to open the parish of Gramalote. The image of ornamental puertilla the tabernacle of the ship left the church.

=== Christmas bonus ===
Date: 16 to Dec. 24. By tradition is to give joy, color, religion and rejoicing at the arrival of Christmas. This is the character festivities qeu alternated with the religious holiday. There are parades of floats, bands, comparzas, in costume, powder, paint and water. During the days preceding the ninth of the Nativity of the Lord, activities begin at four o'clock, with the mass of bonuses, after it, using as a tier atrium parish, was engaged as a tradition of contests and competitions. At noon is the extra-led urban sector together and two or three villages. A six in the afternoon is the Holy Mass and then the processions of shrines and lanterns representing the biblical passages referring to Christmas. In the hours of the night was performed acts related to the topic of extra. On December 24 the parade takes place with all of the groups offered during the ninth parade that travels the streets of the population to finally concentrate on the restoration of the plaza where the trial takes place and awards from the City Administration, culminating with the popular dances that are performed in the outdoor park where families are concentrated.
