= El Carmen, Norte de Santander =

Coordinates: 8.51278°N 73.4508°W

- Municipality and town
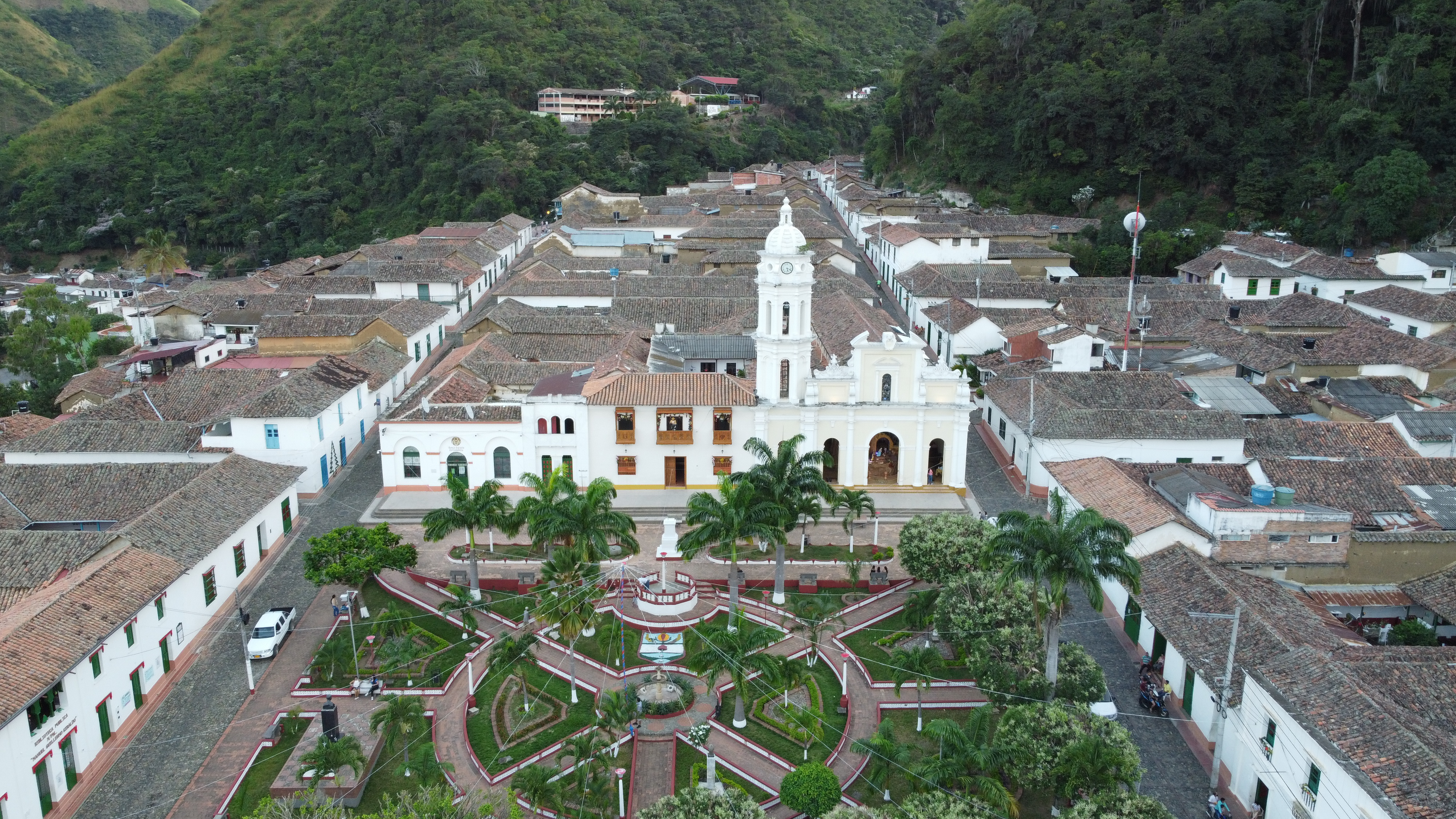

- Flag

- Location of the municipality and town of El Carmen, Norte de Santander in the Norte de Santander Department of Colombia.
- Country: Colombia
- Department: Norte de Santander Department

Area
  - Total: 1,687 km^{2} (651 sq mi)

Population (Census 2018)
  - Total: 12,001
  - Density: 7.114/km^{2} (18.42/sq mi)
- Time zone: UTC-5 (Colombia Standard Time)
- Website: elcarmen-nortedesantander.gov.co

El Carmen is a Colombian municipality located in the department of North Santander.
