= Convención =

Coordinates: 8°50′N 73°12′W

- Municipality
- Flag Coat of arms

- Location of the municipality and town of Convención in the Norte de Santander Department of Colombia.
- Country: Colombia
- Department: Norte de Santander Department

Area
  - Total: 907 km^{2} (350 sq mi)
- Elevation: 1,076 m (3,530 ft)

Population (Census 2018)
  - Total: 18,112
  - Density: 20.0/km^{2} (51.7/sq mi)
- Time zone: UTC-5 (Colombia Standard Time)
- Climate: Aw

Convención is a Colombian municipality located in the department of North Santander. It is considered the largest producer of panela in the department. Account, according to figures estimated by the DANE, with a population of 16,605. It is located at 1,076 meters above sea level and has a temperate climate.

== History ==
The first conqueror to set foot in these territories was the German Ambrosio Alfinger in 1530, who perished in combat with the aborigines. Later, Spaniards Pedro de Ursua and Ortón Velázquez founded many settlements in what is now Norte de Santander.

== Climate ==
Climate data for Convención
Month	Jan	Feb	Mar	Apr	May	Jun	Jul	Aug	Sep	Oct	Nov	Dec	Year
Mean daily maximum °C (°F)	24.5 (76.1)	25.0 (77.0)	25.6 (78.1)	26.0 (78.8)	26.8 (80.2)	26.8 (80.2)	26.7 (80.1)	27.4 (81.3)	27.4 (81.3)	26.8 (80.2)	25.7 (78.3)	24.6 (76.3)	26.1 (79.0)
Daily mean °C (°F)	20.8 (69.4)	21.3 (70.3)	21.8 (71.2)	22.2 (72.0)	22.6 (72.7)	22.5 (72.5)	22.3 (72.1)	22.7 (72.9)	22.5 (72.5)	22.1 (71.8)	21.6 (70.9)	21.0 (69.8)	21.9 (71.4)
Mean daily minimum °C (°F)	17.7 (63.9)	17.9 (64.2)	18.4 (65.1)	18.9 (66.0)	19.0 (66.2)	18.6 (65.5)	18.2 (64.8)	18.4 (65.1)	18.5 (65.3)	18.5 (65.3)	18.5 (65.3)	18.1 (64.6)	18.4 (65.1)
Average precipitation mm (inches)	46.8 (1.84)	46.8 (1.84)	64.9 (2.56)	128.3 (5.05)	148.1 (5.83)	106.7 (4.20)	128.3 (5.05)	135.8 (5.35)	178.4 (7.02)	206.9 (8.15)	171.7 (6.76)	98.5 (3.88)	1,461.3 (57.53)
Average precipitation days	10	9	11	15	17	14	17	18	19	20	19	16	186
Average relative humidity (%)	84	82	82	84	83	81	80	79	81	83	85	86	83
Mean monthly sunshine hours	170.5	135.5	127.1	114.0	148.8	183.0	213.9	207.7	165.0	161.2	150.0	136.4	1,913.1
Mean daily sunshine hours	5.5	4.8	4.1	3.8	4.8	6.1	6.9	6.7	5.5	5.2	5.0	4.4	5.2
Source: Instituto de Hidrologia Meteorologia y Estudios Ambientales
