= Sardinata =

- Municipality and town

- Flag

- Location of the municipality and town of Sardinata in the Norte de Santander Department of Colombia

- Location in Colombia
- Coordinates: 8°5′N 72°48′W
- Country: Colombia
- Department: Norte de Santander Department

Area
  - Water: 1,451.17 km^{2} (560.30 sq mi)
- Elevation: 320 m (1,050 ft)

Population (2015)
  - Municipality and town: 22,632
  - Urban: 9,188
- Time zone: UTC-5 (Colombia Standard Time)

Sardinata (Spanish pronunciation: [saɾðiˈnata]) is a Colombian municipality and town located in the department of Norte de Santander.

== Climate ==
Climate data for Sardinata, elevation 320 m (1,050 ft), (1981–2010)
Month	Jan	Feb	Mar	Apr	May	Jun	Jul	Aug	Sep	Oct	Nov	Dec	Year
Mean daily maximum °C (°F)	30.0 (86.0)	30.9 (87.6)	31.0 (87.8)	31.5 (88.7)	32.7 (90.9)	33.5 (92.3)	33.8 (92.8)	34.3 (93.7)	33.5 (92.3)	32.1 (89.8)	30.9 (87.6)	29.7 (85.5)	32.0 (89.6)
Daily mean °C (°F)	25.0 (77.0)	25.6 (78.1)	26.1 (79.0)	26.5 (79.7)	27.0 (80.6)	27.4 (81.3)	27.5 (81.5)	27.8 (82.0)	27.2 (81.0)	26.5 (79.7)	25.9 (78.6)	25.2 (77.4)	26.5 (79.7)
Mean daily minimum °C (°F)	20.1 (68.2)	20.8 (69.4)	21.4 (70.5)	21.9 (71.4)	21.7 (71.1)	21.4 (70.5)	21.3 (70.3)	21.4 (70.5)	21.3 (70.3)	21.3 (70.3)	21.2 (70.2)	20.8 (69.4)	21.2 (70.2)
Average precipitation mm (inches)	79.3 (3.12)	86.9 (3.42)	125.7 (4.95)	185.8 (7.31)	162.4 (6.39)	59.3 (2.33)	54.8 (2.16)	118.2 (4.65)	189.0 (7.44)	265.6 (10.46)	234.0 (9.21)	144.1 (5.67)	1,699.2 (66.90)
Average precipitation days	8	9	12	14	13	9	11	12	15	18	16	12	149
Average relative humidity (%)	83	81	81	83	80	73	71	71	77	82	85	85	79
Source: Instituto de Hidrologia Meteorologia y Estudios Ambientales
