= Chitarero =

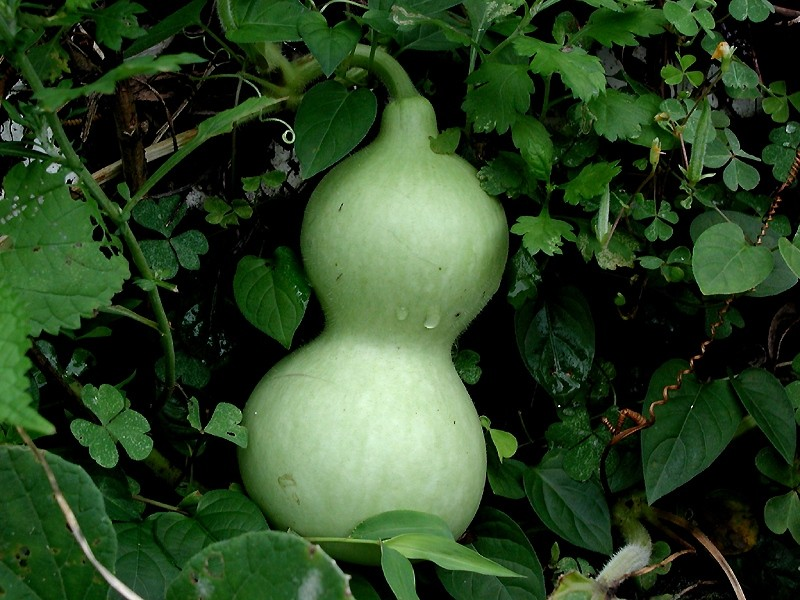
- A calabash gourd or chitarero in the indigenous language, for which the Spanish named the Chitareros

Regions with significant populations
- Norte de Santander, Santander, Colombia; Táchira, Venezuela

Languages
- Chibcha, Colombian Spanish, Venezuelan Spanish

Religion
- Traditional religion, Catholicism

Related ethnic groups
- Lache, U'wa, Muisca, Guane

The Chitarero were an indigenous Chibcha-speaking people in the Andes of north-eastern Colombia and north-western Venezuela. They were responsible for the death of the German conquistador Ambrosius Ehinger in 1533 by means of poisoned arrows.

At the time of the Spanish conquest of the Chibchan Nations, their territory ranged from present-day Táchira (Venezuela) to the northwest and south of Norte de Santander Department and the northeast of Santander Department (Colombia). The Chicamocha River formed a southern boundary, the Valegra a southwestern, and the Surata a southeastern. One of their settlements became the Colombian town of Chinácota; they were primarily known in the area of Pamplona, Colombia. At the refoundation of Pamplona in 1549 there were said to be 200,000 in the area.

They were called "Chitareros" by the Spanish, because of the general custom that the men had to carry hanging from the waist a calabazo or totumo (calabash gourds) with maize wine or chicha as the Spanish called it. Asking what the thing they carried was called, the natives responded that it was a chitarero.

They traded with other peoples in the region, including the Muisca, the Guane and Lache.

== Bibliography ==
- Moreno González, Leonardo (2011). "Paisaje y poblamiento del nororiente andino colombiano: la etnia de los Chitareros en el siglo XVI" (PDF). Fermentum (in Spanish). 009 - Nº 25.
- Simón, Pedro (1861) [1560]. The expedition of Pedro de Ursúa & Lope de Aguirre in search of El Dorado and Omagua in 1560 - 1: translated from Pedro Simon's sixth historical notice of the conquest of Tierra Firme Volume 28 of 1: Works. Hakluyt Society.
