= Santiago, Norte de Santander =

Coordinates: 7°55′N 72°40′W

Santiago
- Municipality
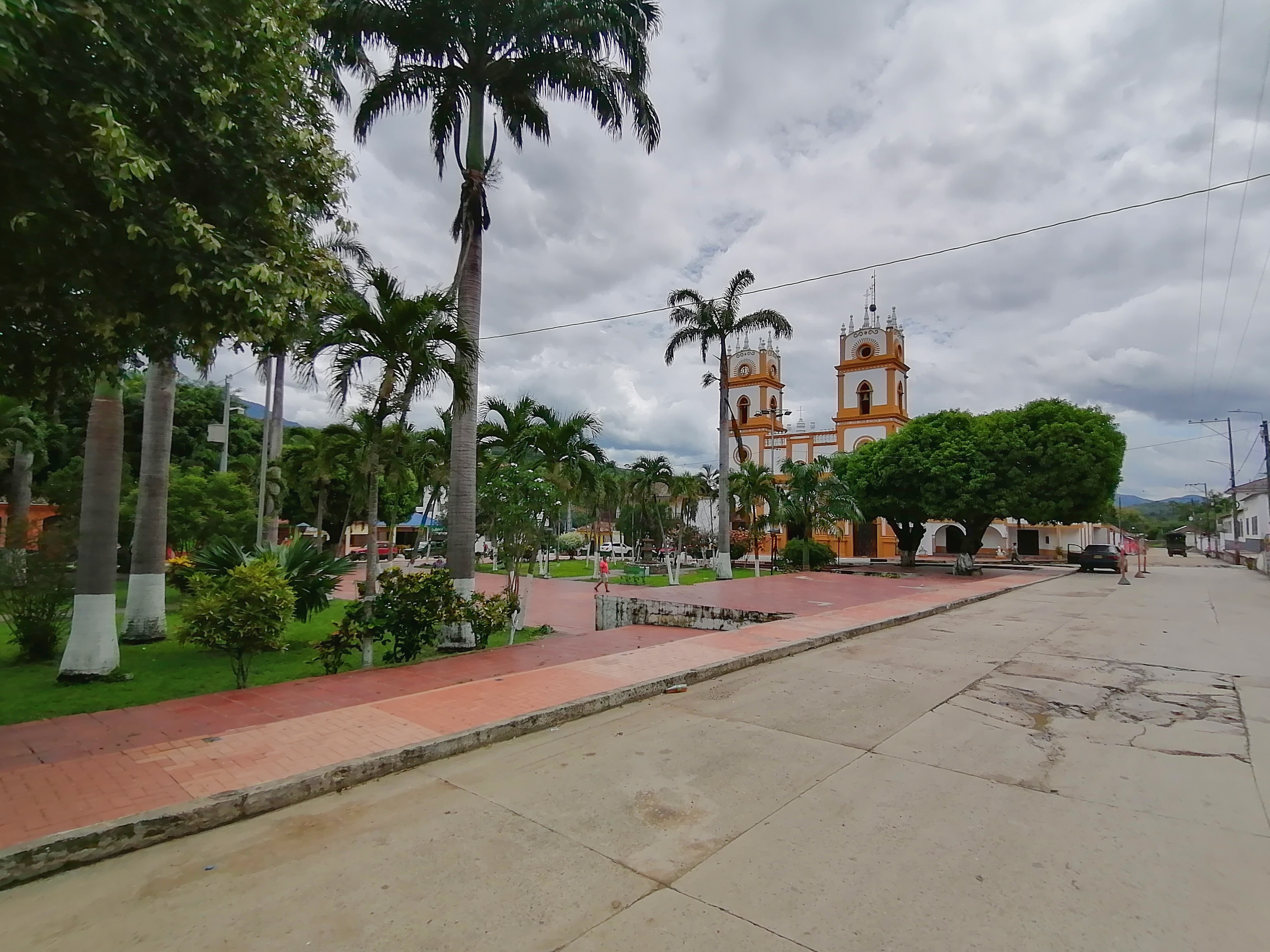

- Flag

- Location of Santiago in Norte de Santander Department, Colombia.
- Country: Colombia
- Department: Norte de Santander Department
- Time zone: UTC-5 (Colombia Standard Time)

Santiago (Spanish pronunciation: [sanˈtjaɣo]) is a municipality in the department of North Santander in Colombia. It includes a town of the same name.
