= Bochalema =

Town in Norte de Santander Department, Colombia

Coordinates: 7°40′N 72°35′W

- Municipality and town
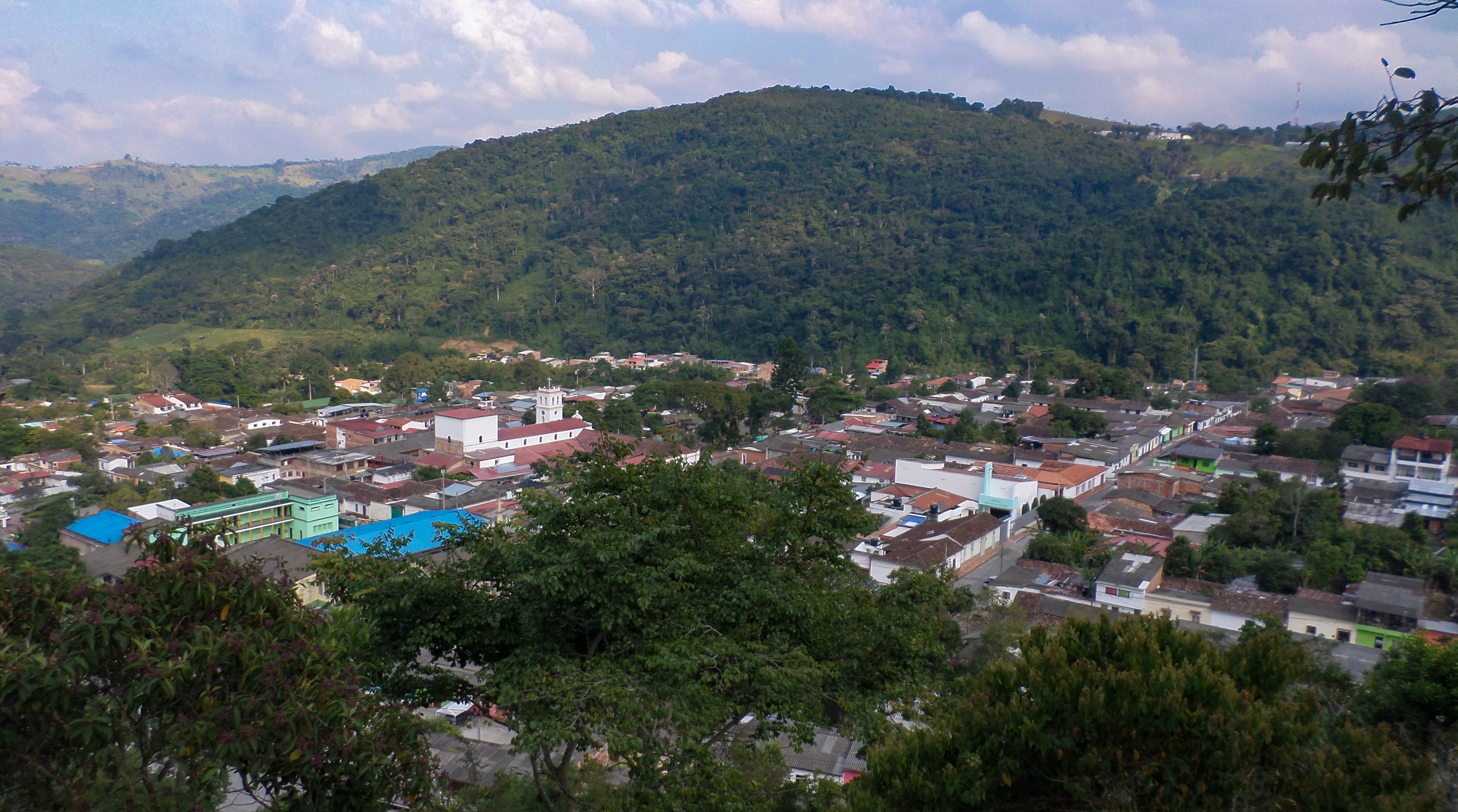
- View of Bochalema

- Flag Coat of arms

- Location of the municipality and town of Bochalema in the Norte de Santander Department of Colombia.
- Country: Colombia
- Department: Norte de Santander Department

Area
  - Municipality and town: 172 km^{2} (66 sq mi)
- Elevation: 1,051 m (3,448 ft)

Population (2015)
  - Municipality and town: 6,973
  - Urban: 2,509
- Time zone: UTC-5 (Colombia Standard Time)
- Climate: Af

Bochalema is a municipality in the department of North Santander in Colombia. It includes a town of the same name.
