= List of museums in Colombia =

This is a list of museums in Colombia by department.

There are approximately 35 art museums in Colombia and over 100 museums in total. The nation's capital of Bogotá has 58 museums, notably the Museo del Oro.

== Legend ==
Closed/defunct

By Department: Capital District · Amazonas · Antioquia · Atlántico · Bolívar · Boyacá · Caldas · Cauca · Cundinamarca · Huila · Magdalena · Norte de Santander · Putumayo · Quindío · Risaralda · Santander · Tolima · Valle del Cauca · Other

== Capital District ==
Name	Spanish name	Location	Type	Image
Art Collection of the Bank of the Republic	Colección de Arte del Banco de la República	Bogotá	Art	
Bogotá Museum of Modern Art	Museo de Arte Moderno de Bogotá	Bogotá	Art	
Children's Museum of Bogotá	Fundación Museo de los Niños	Bogotá	Children's	
Fragmentos	Fragmentos, Espacio de Arte y Memoria	Bogotá	Art	
Gold Museum, Bogotá	Museo del Oro	Bogotá	Archeology	
International Museum of the Emerald	Museo Internacional De La Esmeralda	Bogotá	Mineral	
Jorge Eliecer Gaitan Museum	Casa Museo Jorge Eliecer Gaitan	Bogotá	History	
José Royo y Gómez Geological Museum	Museo Geologico José Royo y Gómez	Bogotá	Science	
Maloka Museum	Maloka	Bogotá	Science	
Miguel Urrutia Art Museum	Museo de Arte Miguel Urrutia	Bogotá	Art	
Military Museum of Colombia	Museo Militar de Colombia	Bogotá	Military	
Museo Botero	Museo Botero	Bogotá	Art	
Museo Casa de Moneda	Museo Casa de Moneda	Bogotá	Numismatics	
Colonial Museum of Bogotá	Mueso Colonial	Bogotá	Art	
Museum of Contemporary Art of Bogotá	Museo de Arte Contemporáneo de Bogotá	Bogotá	Art	
National Museum of Colombia	Museo Nacional de Colombia	Bogotá	National	
Natural History Museum of Bogotá	Museo de Historia Natural	Bogotá	History	
Planetarium of Bogotá	Planetario de Bogotá	Bogotá	Science	
Quinta de Bolívar	Quinta de Bolívar	Bogotá	History	
Museum of the Self-Built City	Museo de la Ciudad Autoconstruida	Ciudad Bolívar, Bogotá	History, Urban Studies	

== Amazonas ==
Name	Spanish name	Location	Type	Image
Ethnography Museum	Biblioteca y Museo Etnográfico	Leticia	Ethnography	

== Antioquia ==
Name	Spanish name	Location	Type	Image
El Castillo Museum	Museo El Castillo	Medellín	Art	
Water Museum EPM	Museo del Agua EPM	Medellín	Technology	
Medellín Museum of Modern Art	Museo de Arte Moderno de Medellín	Medellín	Art	
Museum of Antioquia	Museo de Antioquia	Medellín	Art	
Pablo Escobar Museum	Casa Museo Pablo Escobar	Medellín	History	
Parque Explora	Parque Explora	Medellín	Science	
Planetarium of Medellín	Planetario Medellín de Jesús Emilio Ramírez González	Medellín	Science	

== Atlántico ==
Name	Spanish name	Location	Type	Image
Museo Romántico	Museo Romántico	Barranquilla	History	
Museum of Modern Art of Barranquilla	Museo de Arte Moderno de Barranquilla	Barranquilla	Art	
Museum of the Caribbean	Museo del Caribe	Barranquilla	History/ Culture	

== Bolívar ==
Name	Spanish name	Location	Type	Image
Museo del Oro Zenú	Museo del Oro Zenú	Cartagena	Archeology	
Naval Museum of the Caribbean	Museo Naval del Caribe	Cartagena	History	
Palace of the Inquisition	Palacio de la Inquisición	Cartagena	History	

== Boyacá ==
Name	Spanish name	Location	Type	Image
Archaeology Museum, Sogamoso	Museo Arqueológico de Sogamoso	Sogamoso	Archaeology	
Captain Antonio Ricaurte House Museum	Museo Casa Capitán Antonio Ricaurte	Villa de Leyva	History	
Casa del Fundador Gonzalo Suárez Rendón	Casa del Fundador Gonzalo Suárez Rendón	Tunja	History	
Casa Museo Antonio Nariño	Casa Museo Antonio Nariño	Villa de Leyva	History	

== Caldas ==
Name	Spanish name	Location	Type	Image
Cultural and Historical Museum of La Dorada	Museo Cultural e Histórico de La Dorada	La Dorada	History	

== Caquetá ==
Name	Spanish name	Location	Type	Image
Caquetá Museum	Museo Caquetá	Florencia	History	

== Cauca ==
Name	Spanish name	Location	Type	Image
Popayán Archdiocesan Museum of Religious Art	Museo de Arte Religioso de Popayán	Popayán	Art	

== Cundinamarca ==
Name	Spanish name	Location	Type	Image
Archeological Museum of Pasca	Museo de Arqueología e Historia Natural de Pasca	Pasca	Archeology	
Colombian Aerospace Museum	Museo Aeroespacial Colombiano	Tocancipá	Aviation	
Museo del Disco	Museo del Disco: Carlos Pinzón Moncaleano	Zipacón	Music	
Tequendama Falls Museum	Casa Museo Salto de Tequendama Biodiversidad y Cultura	San Antonio del Tequendama	Science	

== Huila ==
Name	Spanish name	Location	Type	Image
Astronomical Observatory of Tatacoa	Observación astronómica de la Tatacoa	Villavieja	Astronomy	
Neiva Regional Archaeological Museum	Museo Arqueológico Regional de Neiva	Neiva	Archeology	

== Magdalena ==
Name	Spanish name	Location	Type	Image
Casa de la Aduana	Casa de la Aduana	Santa Marta	History	
Casa del Telegrafista	Casa del Telegrafista	Aracataca	History	
Quinta de San Pedro Alejandrino	Quinta de San Pedro Alejandrino	Santa Marta	History	
Rodadero Sea Aquarium and Museum	Acuario y Museo del Mar del Rodadero	Santa Marta	Maritime	

== Norte de Santander ==
Name	Spanish name	Location	Type	Image
Antón García de Bonilla Museum	Museo Antón García de Bonilla	Ocaña	History	
Casa Natal del General Santander	Casa Natal del General Santander	Villa del Rosario	History	
Norte de Santander and City of Cucutá Museum	Museo Norte de Santander y Ciudad de Cucutá	Cucutá	Art	
Pamplona Colonial House Museum	Museo Casa Colonial de Pamplona	Pamplona	History	

== Putumayo ==
Name	Spanish name	Location	Type	Image
Suruma Museum	Museo Suruma	Villagarzon	Archeology	

== Quindío ==
Name	Spanish name	Location	Type	Image
Quimbaya Museum	Museo del Oro Quimbaya	Armenia	History	

== Risaralda ==
Name	Spanish name	Location	Type	Image
Eliseo Bolívar Museum	Museo Eliseo Bolívar	Belén de Umbría	Archaeology	

== Santander ==
Name	Spanish name	Location	Type	Image
Cotton Mill Museum of San Jose de Suaita	Museo del Algodón y Fábricas de San José de Suaita	San José de Suaita	History	
Museum of Cotton and Canvas of the Earth	Museo del Algodón y Lienzo de la Tierra	Charalá	History	

== Tolima ==
Name	Spanish name	Location	Type	Image
Museo de Arte del Tolima	Museo de Arte del Tolima	Ibagué	Art	

== Valle del Cauca ==
Name	Spanish name	Location	Type	Image
Calima Gold Museum	Museo del Oro Calima	Cali	Archaeology	
Grajales Grape and Wine Museum	Museo de la Uva y el Vino Grajales	La Unión	Agriculture	
La Tertulia Museum	Museo La Tertulia	Cali	Art	
Museo Caliwood	Museo Caliwood	Cali	Cinema	
Rayo Museum of Latin American Drawing and Engraving	Museo Rayo de Dibujo y Grabado Latinoamericano	Roldanillo	Art	

== Other ==
This section includes mobile and virtual museums based in and/or specifically serving Colombia.

Name	Spanish name	Type	Image
Q Museum	Museo Q	LGBTQ	

== See also ==
- Lists of museums
- Culture of Colombia
- Tourism in Colombia
- Colombian art
- History of Colombia
