= Norte de Santander and City of Cucutá Museum =

- Established: December 14, 2011; 13 years ago
- Location: Cucutá, Colombia
- Coordinates: 7.883444°N 72.499447°W
- Type: Art museum
- Website: www.museonortedesantander.com

The Norte de Santander and City of Cucutá Museum (Spanish: Museo Norte de Santander y Ciudad de Cucutá) is a museum located in northeastern Colombia. The museum is in charge of exhibiting art and photographs of the department of Norte de Santander. The museum is dedicated to preserving the regional heritage.

== History ==
The museum is managed by the Norte de Santander and City of Cúcuta Foundation, which was created in 2006. In 2010, the government gave a building to the Foundation, the building was an old house of the brothers Carlos and Sofia Ferrero during that year, the building was in poor condition, in 2011 began the remodeling of the building, in which 60 million Colombian pesos were contributed by the Departmental Government and an additional 70 million by regional companies. In December 2021, it opened for the first time. In 2014, the museum implemented a Film Club program. In August 2021, members of the museum participated in the Colombian Bicentennial Commemoration event in Villa del Rosario.

== Collections ==
The museum contains a collection of paintings and sculptures. The museum contains commercial writings and an act of foundation of the railroad of Cucutá, in addition the museum has a collection of letters, documents, newspapers, that great part are of the XIX century. In addition, the museum contains archaeological pieces from pre-Hispanic times. As well as objects from the XIV and XX centuries such as crockery, musical instruments, clothing and furniture. The museum contains photographs and maps about the development of the city of Cucutá. In 2016, the exhibition "Cucutá, infinite city" was presented in which photographs of Cucutá were exhibited, as well as photographs of the municipalities of the Metropolitan Area such as El Zulia, Los Patios, Puerto Santander, San Cayetano and Villa del Rosario, in this exhibition included works by Wilmer Leonardo Useché, Israel Cerón Murillo and Freeman Valencia Zúñiga. In 2019, the museum presented the exhibition "es_ta_do_na_ción", which deals with artistic expressions of political organization since the 17th century as well as ideas of nationhood and the collapse of contemporaneity. During this 2019 exhibition, Glenda León, Núria Güell, Timea Oravecz, Khaled Jarrar, Mohamed Arejdal, Alan Carrasco and Wilmer Useche participated. In 2021, ceramics by the artist Belén de Roma that were worked on six years ago were exhibited, among his works exhibited was the Hecuba Wheel. During the confinement of the Covid-19 pandemic, the museum acquired 60 pieces of art.
