= Metropolitan Area of Cúcuta =

Cúcuta metropolitan area Cúcuta-Los Patios-Villa del Rosario
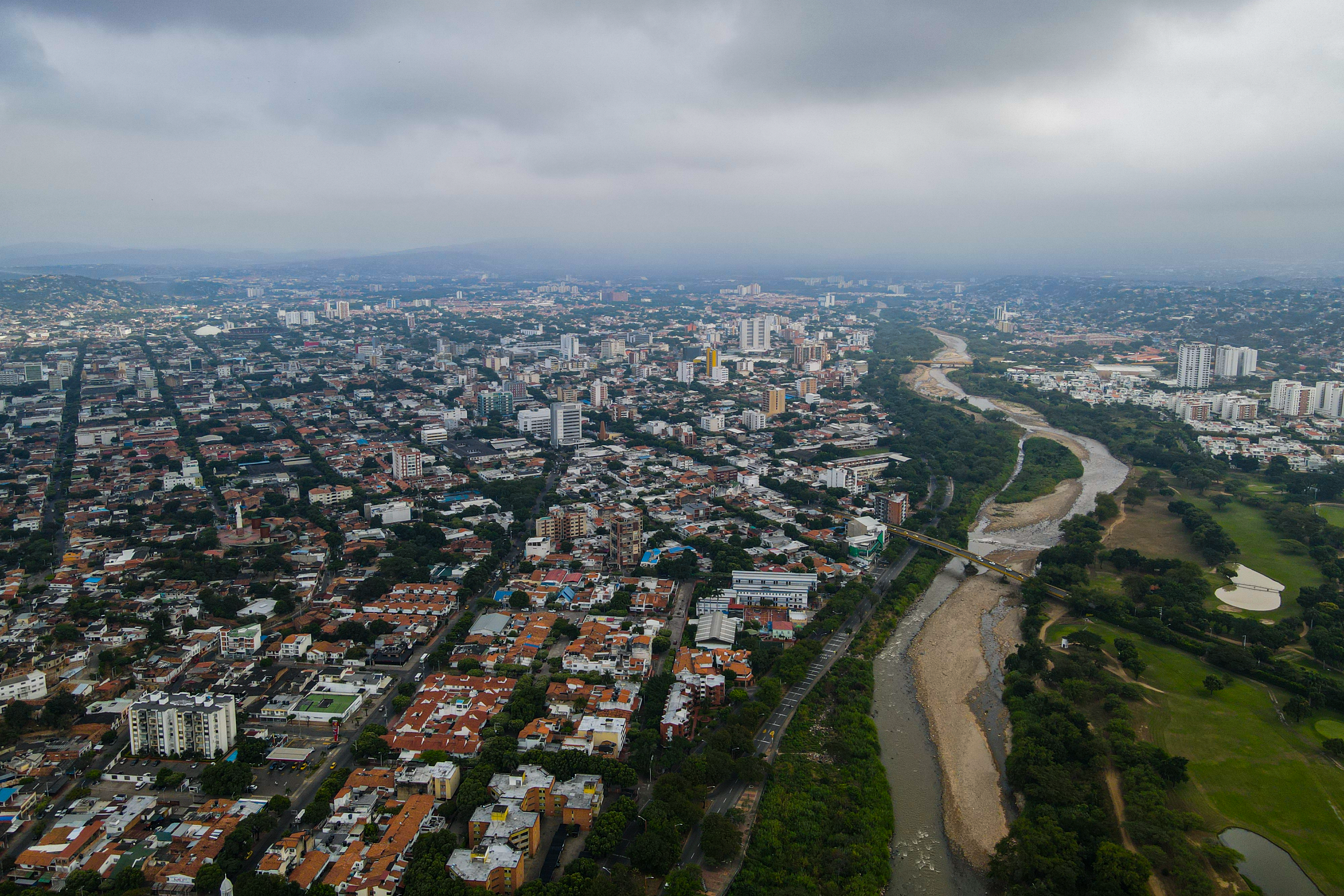
- Motto: Por la región lo damos todo!.
- Metropolitan Area

- Location within Colombia
- Coordinates: 7°54′N 72°34′W
- Nacional: Colombia
- Department: North Santander
- Largest city: Cúcuta
- Other Municipalities: Villa del Rosario, Los Patios, El Zulia, Puerto Santander, San Cayetano.

Area
  - Total: 470 sq mi (1,200 km^{2})

Population (2010)
  - Total: 804,632
  - Density: 399/sq mi (154/km^{2})
- Time zone: UTC-5 (Eastern Time Zone)

The Cúcuta metropolitan area is a Colombian metropolitan area located in the eastern section of the Norte de Santander department bordering with Venezuela. Its main city is Cúcuta. It is composed by the municipalities of Cúcuta, Los Patios, Villa del Rosario, San Cayetano, El Zulia and Puerto Santander.

Metropolitan Areas of Colombia

It was created by the Decree # 000508 of 1991.

The Mayor of Cúcuta has authority over all the municipalities of this conurbation as the Metropolitan Mayor, although these territorial beings conserve their autonomy (mayorship, council, etc..).

== See also ==
- Cúcuta
- Metropolitan areas of Colombia
- Metropolitan area
- Conurbation
