= Maloka =

Maloka may refer to:

- Maloca, a type of house used by indigenous people of the Amazon
- Maloka Museum, a museum of sciences in Bogotá, Colombia
- 79889 Maloka, a minor planet

== See also ==
- Mallorca
