= Captain Antonio Ricaurte House Museum =

Historic house museum in Colombia

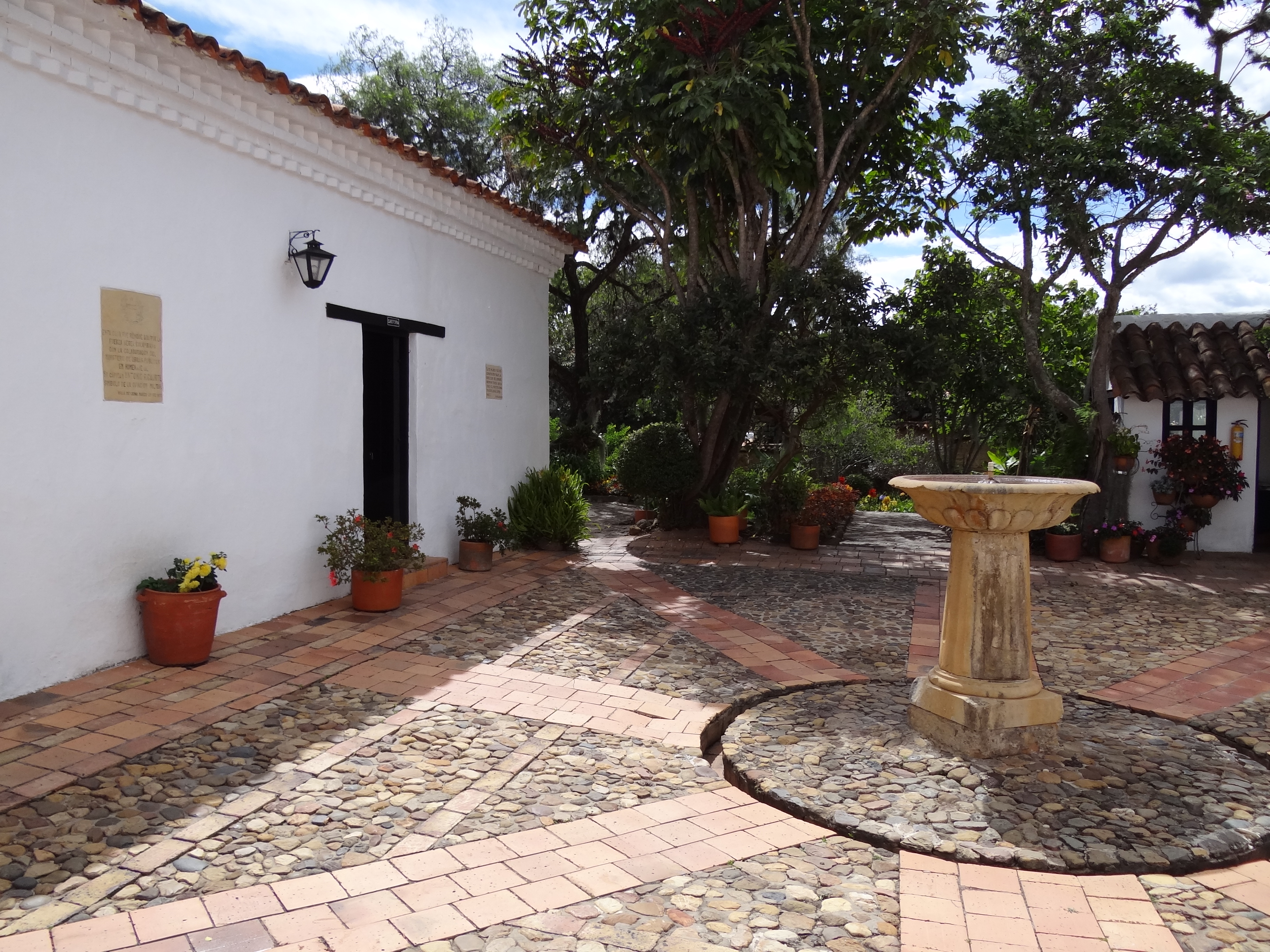
- Established: March 25, 1970; 56 years ago
- Location: Villa del Leyva, Colombia
- Coordinates: 5.63433°N 73.52082°W
- Type: History museum

The Captain Antonio Ricaurte House Museum (Spanish: Museo Casa Capitán Antonio Ricaurte) is a historical museum located in Villa de Leyva, Colombia. The museum is dedicated to show various tools and weapons used in the colonial times of Colombia as well as the history of the country.

== History ==
The museum building was originally used as the home of Antonio Ricaurte. When the Ricaurte family moved to the capital of the Viceroyalty, the house was abandoned. In 1910, the house was used as the headquarters of an Agricultural College. In 1968, the Colombian Air Force decided to convert the house into a museum, in this year, Minister of Defense Gerardo Ayerbe visited the building. In 1969, work was done to restore the house. On March 25, 1970, to commemorate the death of Antonio Ricaurte, the museum was opened to the public for the first time.

== Collections ==
The museum contains exhibits on Colombia's cultural heritage and history. This museum commemorates Captain Antonio Ricaurte, showing exhibits that describe the battles of independence in the region. The museum contains various historical artifacts and a garden. The museum contains over 300 objects including portraits of Antonio Ricuarte and Simon Bolivar, as well as coats of arms of Colombia.

== See also ==
- List of museums in Colombia
