= Antón García de Bonilla Museum =

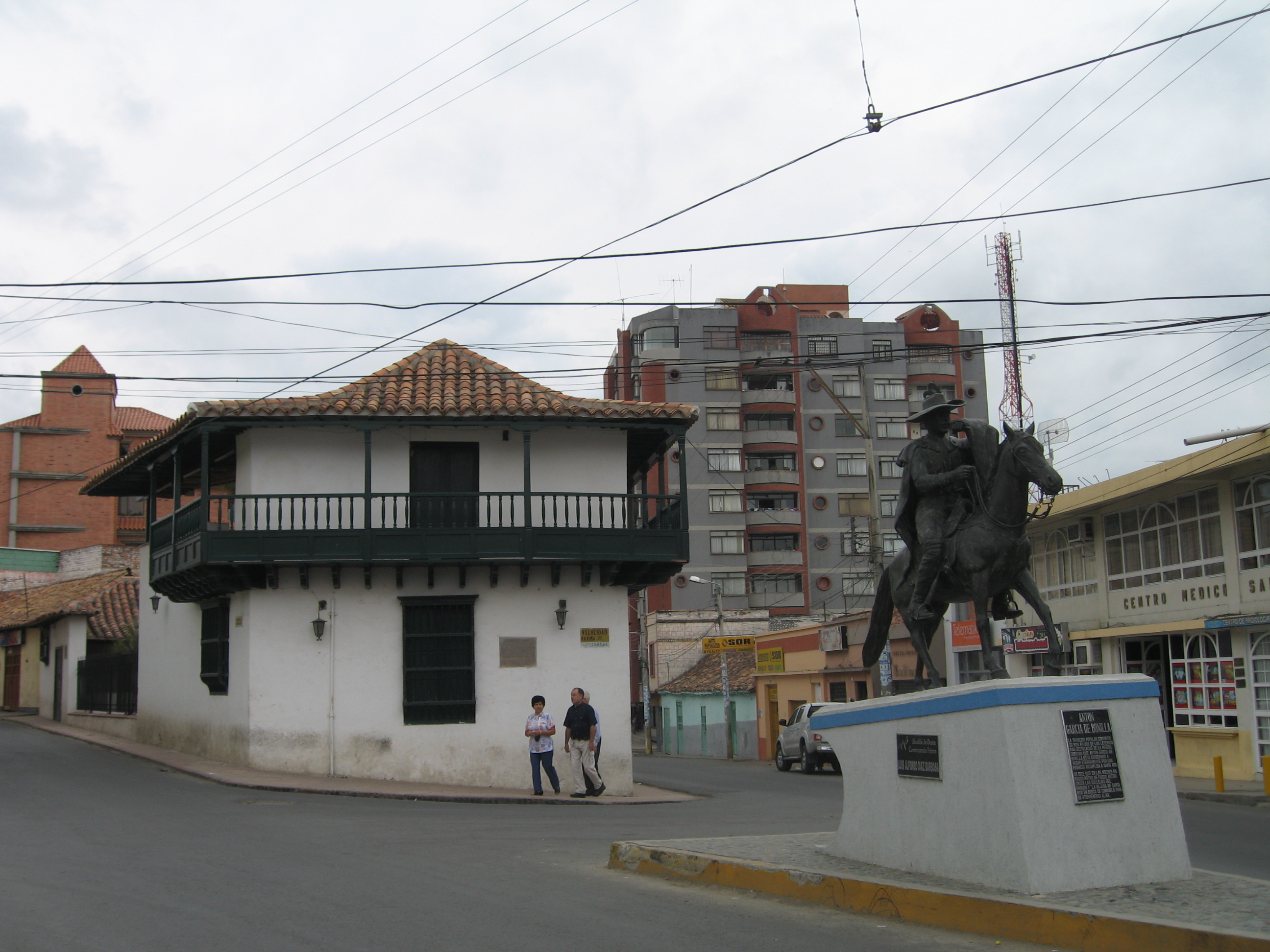
- The museum and an equestrian statue of Antón García de Bonilla.
- Established: February 23, 1973; 52 years ago
- Location: Ocaña, Colombia
- Coordinates: 8.238366°N 73.353315°W
- Type: History museum

The Anton Garcia de Bonilla Museum (Spanish: Museo Antón García de Bonilla) is a museum located in Ocaña, Colombia. The museum contains historical objects of the city and the old province of Ocaña.

== History ==
Traditionally, ownership of the property is attributed to the encomendero Don Antón García de Bonilla, the last of four characters who bore the same name; descendants of the first Antón who arrived in Ocaña in 1570 and settled there.

The museum was founded in 1973. In 2016, the museum presented an exhibition called "Bodegones a la Carta" which included 17 paintings by different artists such as Andrés de Santa María, Ricardo Gómez Campuzano and Ricardo Borrero Álvarez. In September 2017, the museum presented an exhibition of works by Fernando Botero, with 20 paintings. In October 2018, a Salon for Regional Artists was inaugurated, in this salon works of the architect from Cucuta, Wilmer Leonardo Useche Rodríguez were shown. In 2021, the museum participated in the National Strategy of Itinerant Exhibitions (Spanish: Estrategia Nacional de Exposiciones Itinerantes) organized by the National Museum of Colombia.

== Collections ==
The museum contains pre-Columbian pieces such as utensils used by the first settlers of Ocaña dating back to 1578 from the indigenous settlement of Argutacaca according to the Library of the Royal Academy of History of Madrid (Spanish: Biblioteca de la Real Academia de Historia de Madrid). The museum contains the first reredos of the Virgen de la Gracias de la Torcoroma, this reredos dates from 1716. The museum also has an embroidery of the Patrona de Ocaña made by the great-grandmother of the doctor Manuel José Cabrales. The museum contains about 300 pieces, including clothing and textiles. The museum also contains archaeological collections.

Front of the museum is an equestrian statue of Antón García de Bonilla.
