= San Cayetano, Norte de Santander =

Coordinates: 7.88028°N 72.6278°W

San Cayetano
- Municipality and town
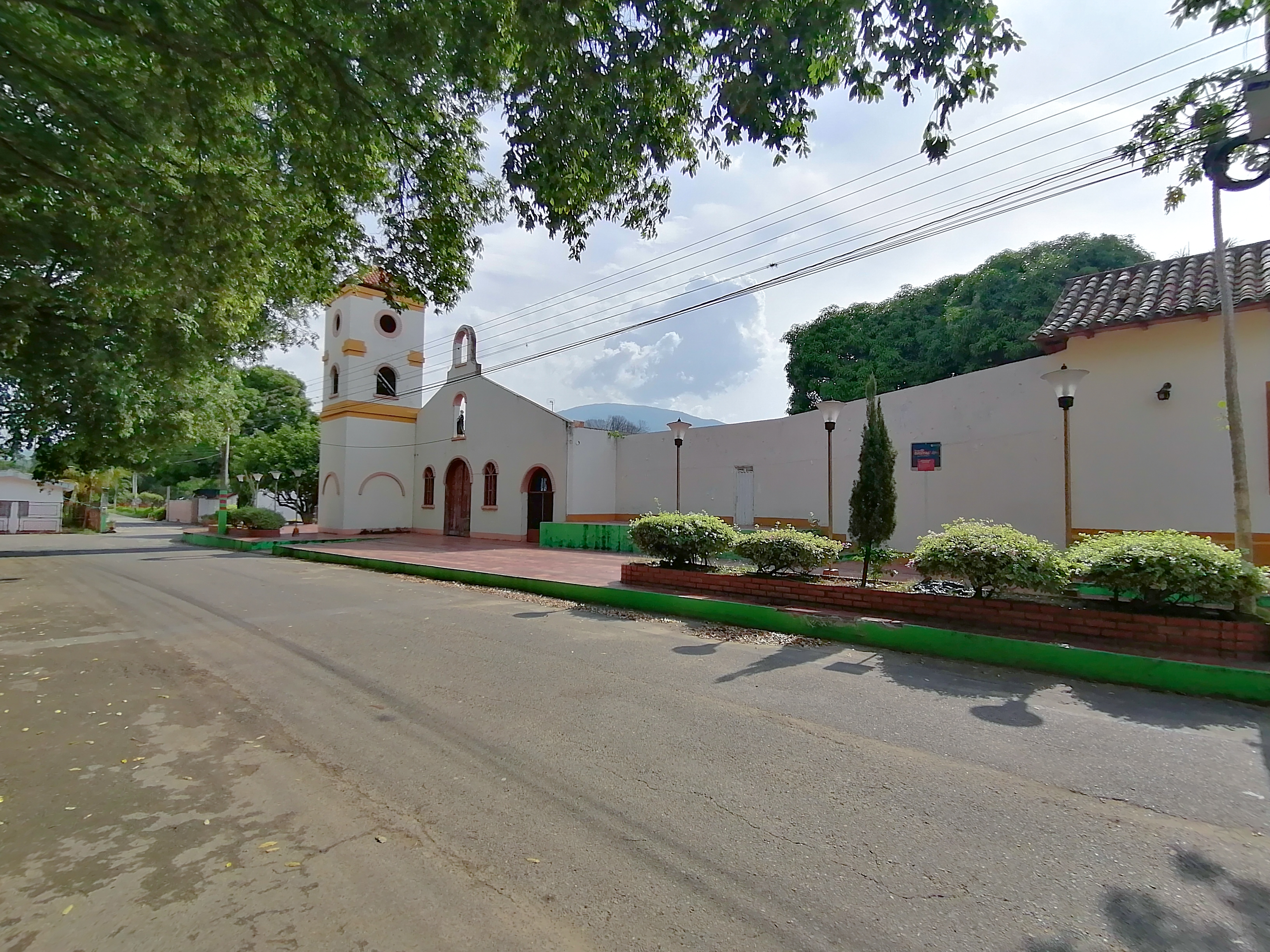

- Flag Coat of arms

- Location of the municipality and town of San Cayetano, Norte de Santander in the Norte de Santander Department of Colombia.
- Country: Colombia
- Department: Norte de Santander Department

Area
  - Municipality and town: 144 km^{2} (56 sq mi)
- Elevation: 235 m (771 ft)

Population (2015)
  - Municipality and town: 5,424
  - Density: 37.7/km^{2} (97.6/sq mi)
  - Urban: 2,092
- Time zone: UTC-5 (Colombia Standard Time)

San Cayetano is a municipality and town in the Norte de Santander Department in Colombia. Part of its area pertains to the Metropolitan Area of Cúcuta.
