= Suruma Museum =

- Established: 2021
- Location: Putumayo, Colombia
- Coordinates: 1.083671182248425°N 76.6305998376024°W
- Type: Archaeological Museum

The Suruma Museum (Spanish: Museo Suruma) is a museum located in the Department of Putumayo, southwestern Colombia. The museum is dedicated to exhibiting the archaeological findings of the department.

== History ==
The artifacts on display in the museum were discovered by Gran Tierra Energy. The archaeological activities were carried out by 25 archaeologists and 160 local field assistants. The excavation took place in an area of over 3300 square meters for more than four months. The Inauguration Ceremony was attended by the mayors of Mocoa, Santiago and Villagarzón, as well as Nicolás Loaiza, director of the Colombian Institute of Anthropology and History. The museum is located in the Amazon Experimental Center, the creation of the museum was supported by an alliance between Gran Tierra Energy and Corpoamazonia. The Amazon Experimental Center (Spanish: Centro Experimental Amazonico), abbreviated as CEA, was founded in 1986 by the Putumayo Autonomous Corporation.

== Collections ==
The museum has 15 permanent exhibits. The museum objects were found in Puerto Asís and in the Alto Putumayo, also known as the Sibundoy Valley. The museum contains collections of lithic artifacts, goldsmith pieces and indigenous ceramics.
