= Neiva Regional Archaeological Museum =

- Established: August 30, 2007; 17 years ago
- Location: Neiva, Colombia
- Coordinates: 2.937433°N 75.293368°W
- Type: Archaeological museum

The Neiva Regional Archaeological Museum (Spanish: Museo Arqueológico Regional de Neiva) is an archeological museum in Neiva, Colombia. The museum is dedicated to the conservation of the cultural heritage of the Department of Huila. The museum is located in the José Eustasio Rivera Convention Center.

== History ==
The museum was inaugurated in 2007 in order to house archeological artifacts of the department of Huila, in addition to preserving the culture of the indigenous people of the department. The Erigaie Foundation was in charge of gathering information on the pre-Hispanic cultures of Huila for the museum's exhibits.

== Collections ==
The museum contains ancient ceramics, relics and statues of indigenous cultures including a replica of the statues of the San Agustin Archeological Park. The museum contains information about archaeological excavations in Huila as well as a series of stones that were used by indigenous communities for carving. The museum contains exhibits on goldsmithing and the evolution of tools. The museum exhibits date from 1,000 B.C. to 1,550 A.D. including exhibits on bone remains, petroglyphs and lithic elements. The museum has more than 300 objects of pre-Columbian origin.
