= El Zulia =

Coordinates: 7°56′N 72°36′W

- Municipality and town
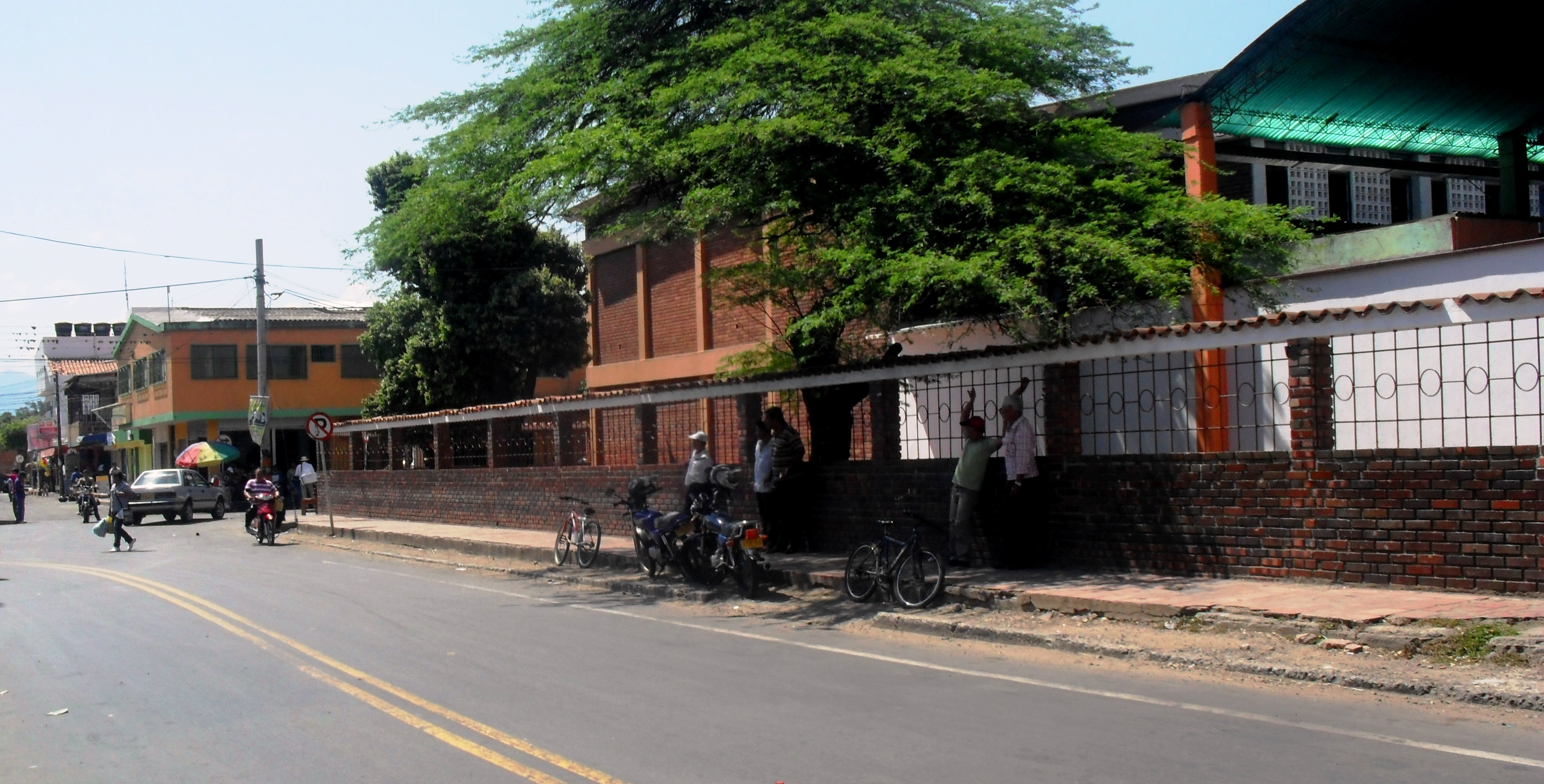
- View of El Zulia

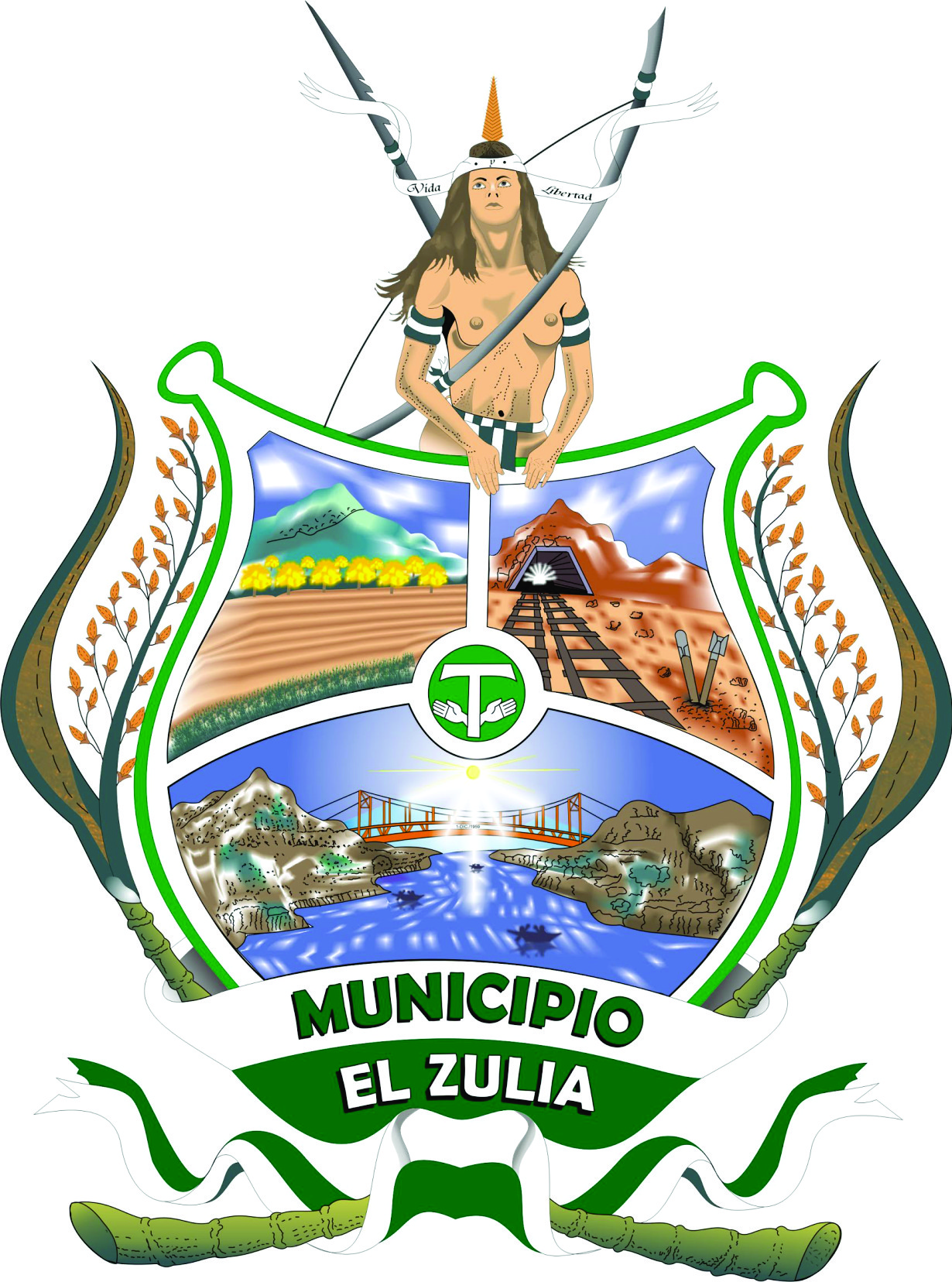
- Flag Coat of arms

- Location of the municipality and town of El Zulia in the Norte de Santander Department of Colombia.
- Country: Colombia
- Department: Norte de Santander Department

Population (Census 2018)
  - Total: 26,019
- Time zone: UTC-5 (Colombia Standard Time)

El Zulia (Spanish pronunciation: [el ˈsulja]) is a municipality of the Norte de Santander Department in Colombia. A portion of this municipality is part of the Metropolitan Area of Cúcuta.

== Climate ==
Climate data for El Zulia (Risaralda), elevation 90 m (300 ft), (1981–2010)
Month	Jan	Feb	Mar	Apr	May	Jun	Jul	Aug	Sep	Oct	Nov	Dec	Year
Mean daily maximum °C (°F)	32.4 (90.3)	32.9 (91.2)	32.9 (91.2)	33.1 (91.6)	33.4 (92.1)	34.0 (93.2)	33.6 (92.5)	34.3 (93.7)	33.7 (92.7)	33.2 (91.8)	32.8 (91.0)	32.4 (90.3)	33.1 (91.6)
Daily mean °C (°F)	26.7 (80.1)	27.0 (80.6)	27.2 (81.0)	27.3 (81.1)	28.2 (82.8)	28.3 (82.9)	28.5 (83.3)	28.6 (83.5)	28.0 (82.4)	27.8 (82.0)	27.0 (80.6)	26.7 (80.1)	27.6 (81.7)
Mean daily minimum °C (°F)	21.4 (70.5)	22.3 (72.1)	21.8 (71.2)	22.8 (73.0)	22.6 (72.7)	23.0 (73.4)	22.2 (72.0)	22.3 (72.1)	22.5 (72.5)	22.4 (72.3)	22.4 (72.3)	22.1 (71.8)	22.3 (72.1)
Average precipitation mm (inches)	107.1 (4.22)	97.0 (3.82)	105.8 (4.17)	200.0 (7.87)	183.1 (7.21)	88.5 (3.48)	103.6 (4.08)	132.5 (5.22)	188.0 (7.40)	274.6 (10.81)	280.3 (11.04)	162.4 (6.39)	1,863.5 (73.37)
Average precipitation days	9	8	9	12	12	8	10	10	12	15	16	12	123
Mean monthly sunshine hours	155.0	135.5	145.7	123.0	167.4	162.0	201.5	198.4	186.0	164.3	144.0	136.4	1,919.2
Mean daily sunshine hours	5.0	4.8	4.7	4.1	5.4	5.4	6.5	6.4	6.2	5.3	4.8	4.4	5.2
Source: Instituto de Hidrologia Meteorologia y Estudios Ambientales
