= Casa de la Aduana =

Colonial building in Santa Marta, Colombia

Tayrona Gold Museum
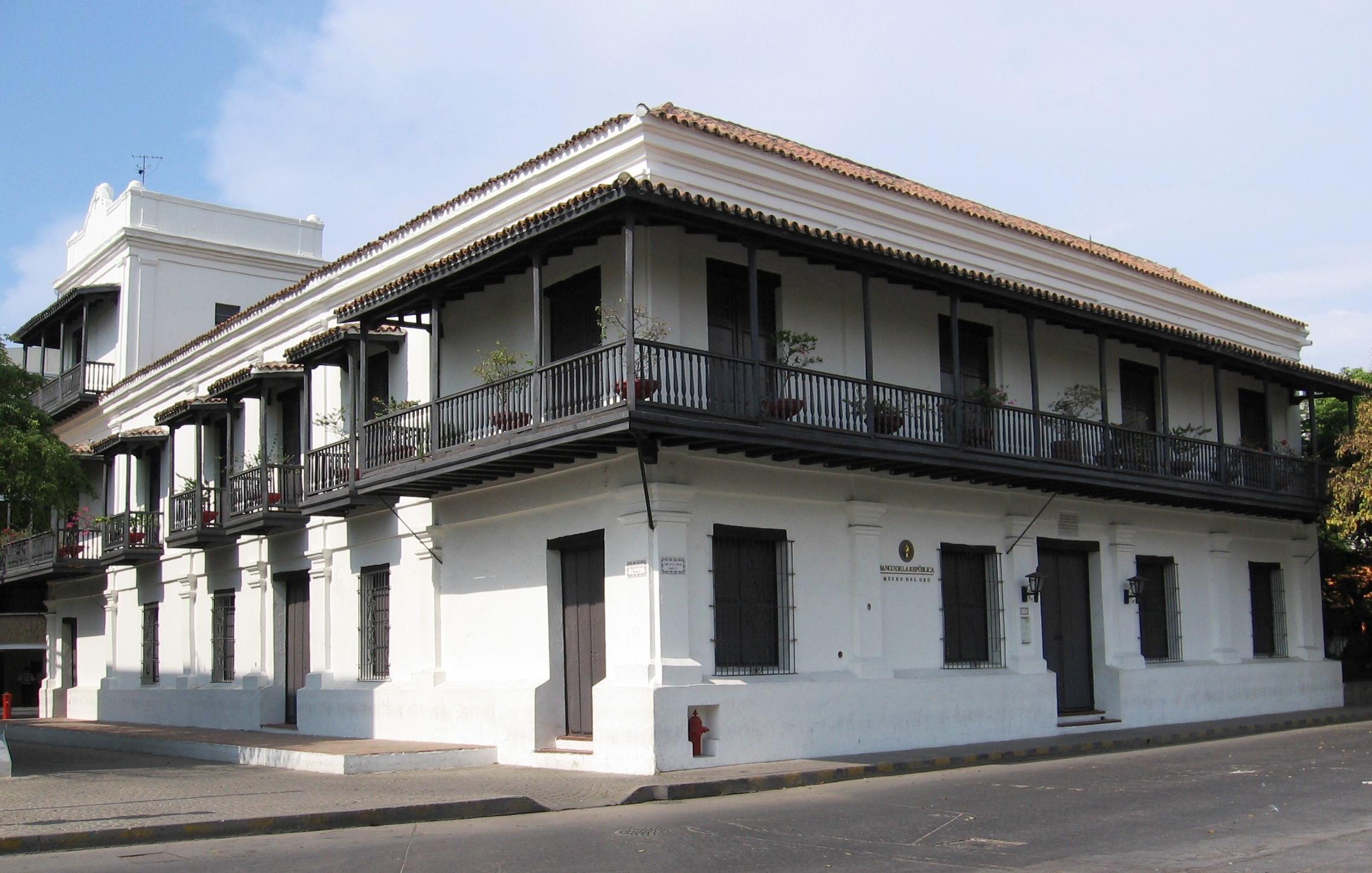
- Museum exterior, 2006
- Location: Santa Marta, Magdalena
- Coordinates: 11°14′43.2″N 74°12′47.4″W

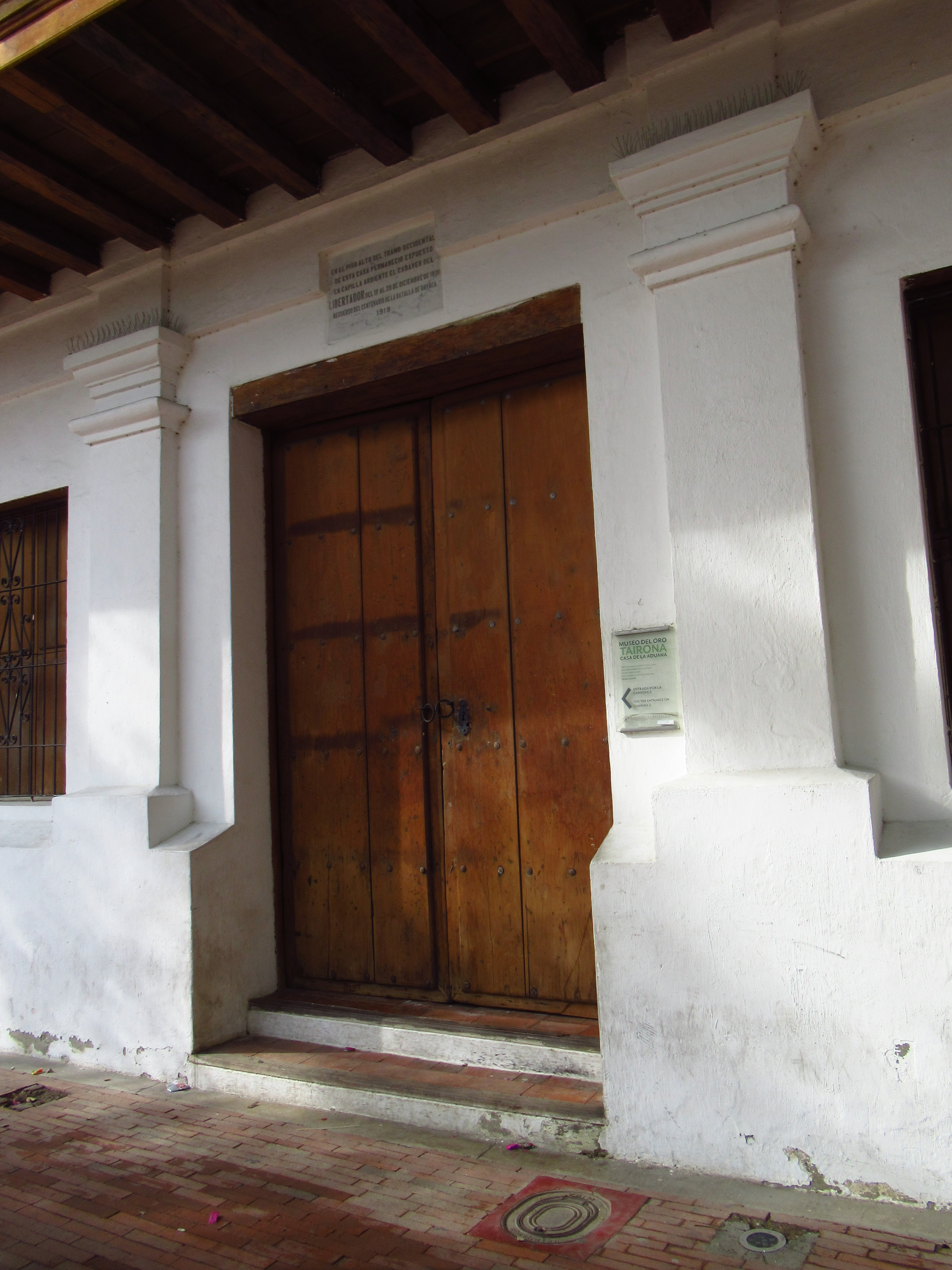
Plaque commemorating the wake of Simón Bolívar, above, lintel of the main door.

Casa de la Aduana (which means Customs House in Spanish; also known as the Tayrona Gold Museum) is a colonial building located in the Plaza de Bolívar in the city of Santa Marta, Magdalena.

It is the regional headquarters of the Gold Museum, which is part of the Bank of the Republic of Colombia. This museum offers the visitor a vision of the goldsmithing and the culture of the ancient inhabitants of the Sierra Nevada.

On the upper floor of the western section of this house, the body of the Simón Bolívar was veiled from December 17 to 20, 1830.

The house was built in 1730, on two floors with a tower from where ships could be seen arriving at the port, as well as the unloading and loading of merchandise.

The house was declared a National Monument through Decree 390 of March 17, 1970.

The building has had various names throughout its history, among others: Palacio Verde, Castillo de San Lázaro, Casa de la Aduana, Casa del Consulado, Commissariat of the United Fruit Company, Colonial Hotel, Tayrona Gold Museum, Tayrona Gold Museum - Customs House.

The Customs House is located at the intersection of Carrera 2 and Calle 14, Plaza de Bolívar, in Santa Marta, Magdalena, Colombia.

== See also ==
- National Monuments of Colombia
