= Puerto Santander, Norte de Santander =

Coordinates: 8.36361°N 72.4075°W

Puerto Santander
- Municipality and town
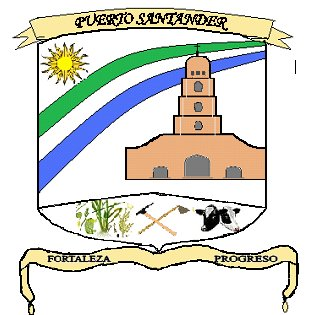
- Flag Coat of arms

- Location of the municipality and town of Puerto Santander in the Norte de Santander Department of Colombia.
- Country: Colombia
- Department: Norte de Santander Department

Area
  - Municipality and town: 42 km^{2} (16 sq mi)

Population (2015)
  - Municipality and town: 10,249
  - Urban: 9,514
- Time zone: UTC−5 (COL)

Puerto Santander is a municipality in the Norte de Santander Department in Colombia. It includes a town of the same name and is part of the rural zone of Metropolitan Area of Cúcuta and is located north of Cúcuta, surrounded by the municipality of Cúcuta and the border with Venezuela. It is also the smallest municipality in the department.
