= Government of Cúcuta =

The government of Cúcuta, Colombia includes the municipal head, the small towns of Agua Clara, El Escobal, Guaramito, El Carmen de Tonchalá, and the small villages of Alto Viento, El Rodeo, La Jarra, Puerto León and Puerto Nuevo.

== Overview ==
At the present time, the Municipality of Cúcuta is made up of two areas: the urban area and the rural area.

The urban zone is divided into 10 blocks, while the countryside is split into jurisdictions. The boundaries are maintained by the Secretary of Development to the community and the Office of Municipal Planning in accordance with the orders of Agreement Number 061 of August 18, 1994. A majority of the communes are represented at the Municipal Government by the Local Administrators, exerting the powers given to them in the agreement.

Each Commune must have their own J.A.L., which is made up of 7 dignitaries who are chosen by a public vote for an elected period of a year. The J.A.L. must provide support to the public services, such as environmental cleaning, public health, education, public works (both future and present), mass transit and community organization. They are able, in the case of public works, to indicate the priority of various works to the mayor, propose investment plans and must contribute these plans to the development of the Municipality.

The jurisdictions are:

- San Faustino, which at the time of the colony was an interior and very important port. It was created by Agreement no. 002 of January 17, 1891.
- Palmarito, which was created by Agreement no. 24 of May 21, 1975.
- Ricaurte, previously called Mucujún, was created by Agreements no. 12 and 14 of July 1921.
- Carmen de Tonchalá, where Doña Juana Rangel de Cuéllar lived when the donation of the lands upon which Cúcuta now stands was made. It was created by means of Agreement no. 18 of May 28, 1880 and ratified by Agreement No. 17 of September 13, 1882.
- The Good Hope, which was created by Agreement no. 018 of September 20, 1982.
- San Pedro, after the 1875 Cúcuta earthquake, settled after a year to be the capital of the province of Cúcuta. It was created by Agreement no. 005 of March 8, 1946. In 1885, it was also the seat of the Departmental Headquarters of Cúcuta.

== Administrative divisions ==
Administratively, the Mayorship of Cúcuta is divided in two large groups: the Central Administration and the decentralized administration. Central Administration classes those organizations that depend directly on the Mayor as Secretaries (Secretariats) or Departments. The Secretaries are administrative units whose main objective is the benefit of services to the community or the Central Administration. The Administrative Departments are units of a technical character. The Central Administration is composed of the General Secretary, Municipal Secretary, Secretary of Property, Secretary of Public Works, Secretary of Education, Secretary of Development to the Community, Department of Planning, Department of Transit, Municipal Treasury, Municipal Cultural Center, Legal Department and Internal Control.

=== General Secretary ===
The General Secretary is required to attend the mayor in the planning, organization, control and execution of his administrative tasks; to take care of the organization and the operation of the office of the mayor. Duties also include acting as secretary of the Council of Government and to watch the opportune fulfillment of their decisions, to ensure the operation of the mayorship remains lawful, to study, review and prepare the projects in agreements, resolutions, decrees and contracts pertinent to the mayorship.

=== Secretary of Government ===
It is the responsibility of the Secretary of Government to develop and evaluate all the programs and campaigns of the municipal administration. This includes the guarantee of civil and social rights, life, honor and goods of the inhabitants of the Municipality, to coordinate policy with regards to the control of prices, weights and measures, raffles, games and spectacles, public establishments, cleanliness, traveling and stationary sale and doing so by applying appropriate sanctions when the pertinent laws are broken. In addition, the secretary is responsible for those imprisoned by the Municipal Police, to receive and process all ordinary or summary complaints, to take care of complaints lodged against the transit system and to control warnings, fences, and posters and to sanction those who violate the existing bylaws.

=== Property Secretary ===
The objective of the Treasury of Municipal Rents are to collect all the money that by diverse concepts must perceive the municipality, to carry out the payment of all the accounts in charge of the municipality of Cúcuta and to keep, guard and control the titles, values, guarantees and articles constituted in favor of the municipality. Duties also include transacting processes by coercive jurisdiction of the defaulter of the municipality, in agreement with article 155 of Decree 1333 of 1986, the Decrees Law 1400 and 2019 of 1970 and the legal decree of 1984 and other dispositions. They also grant terms and prorogations to the defaulter while always consulting the economic capacity of the contributors and favoring the interests by Moor according to the stipulations of the law. They handle and render accounts of aid given by the nation, the department and other organizations and fix the policies to follow in the collection of contributions, official and semi-official participation and services of the nation, department, institutions.

==== Municipal Rents ====
The rents of the Municipality can be classified thus: tributary income, nontributary income, fines, against-present rents, participation, occasional rents, compensated income, capital income and balance resources.

- Tributary income is the complementary taxes of predial, industry and commerce, circulation and transit, public events, raffles, and the right of games construction.
- Nontributary income is the proceeds of items such as licenses of conduction, police infractions to the Code of Urbanism, fines and fines of transit.
- Against-present rents are concessions of casinos, rentings and rent of vaults.
- Participation includes oil exemptions, the IVA and slaughter of greater cattle.
- Occasional rents include interests, refunds and resources of lotteries.
- Compensated income is the over-percentage of contracts, sale of ejidos, pro-development stamps and the sale of formats.
- Capital income includes loans for different works.
- Balance resources is the surplus, for example, the cancellation of reserves.

==== Public Work Secretary ====
The main objective of the Public Work Secretary is to take care of the things related to the programming, design, construction and conservation of routes, municipal bridges, parks and buildings. Duties of the position also include directly making or contracting the programs, designs, construction of routes and controlling and supervising programmed works, as well as executing all of them. The secretary pays technical attention to the Meetings of Communal Action, determines the engineering specifications of the works that the administration advances, and makes the topographic works that are required for design and construction. The position is responsible for serving as a connection between the community and the administration.

==== Education Secretary ====
The position of Education Secretary was created by means of Agreement no. 002 of January 10, 1946, reconstructed by means of Agreement 002 of February 3, 1989 and regulated by Decree no. 0249 of February 15, 1989. Duties of the position include guarding the construction of educative establishments, by its dowry and maintenance, like sport facilities of physical education and recreation and to guard the provision of necessary teaching staff for the urban part as well as the rural one. Other responsibilities are dictating standards related to the education system and maintaining a strict control of schools and everything according to Law 60. Within its jurisdiction it must guard at all costs the eradication of the scholastic marginality. Their functions in general can be synthesized thus:

- To administer the Education in the Municipality.
- To guard the quality and cover of the education and its correct benefit.
- To establish necessary policies, plans and programs.
- To foment the investigation and innovation of curriculum
- Cofinanciar resources
- To orient the elaboration and execution of educative projects.

==== Secretary of Development and to the Community ====
The Secretary of Development of the Community was created by means of Agreement no. 057 of September 13, 1989, for the organism and programming that leads the integral development of the community. In the social aspect it coordinates all the social programs, and pays attention to the vulnerable population, youth, women, inhabitants of the street and others of fundamental importance. In communitarian and citizen participation it develops the consultant's office and qualification of communal action, to the Together Local Administrators and causes the participation in decision makings of the community and support to the governmental management. In economics and administration it designs plans and executions of programs to support the small and medium company cucuteña, for the generation of productive, non-bureaucratic use, and for the organization of fairs and enterprise samples. Through the Municipal Unit of Farming Technical Attendance (UMATA) it executes the Plan of Rural and Agrarian Development that is elaborated annually.

==== Administrative Department of Planning ====
The Administrative Department of Planning was created with the intention of elaborating and updating the integral plan of development of the Municipality, the political directives of growth and their area of influence and to elaborate the sectoral plans that compose the integral plan of development and the programs of municipal public investment. It also prepares and applies urban regulations, other legal standards and necessary dispositions for the fulfillment of the integral plan of development. It elaborates the basic statistics for the formulation and evaluation of the integral plan of the development and approves plans and budgets of all new construction and urbanization. The department grants authorization for establishment of industries, sends permissions for obstacles and occupation of routes and grants the demarcation of paramento and sends the domiciliary nomenclatures.

==== Administrative Department of Transit ====
The objectives of the Administrative Department of Transit are to plan, organize, and direct terrestrial transit within the Municipality of Cúcuta, to fulfill the dispositions of the National Code of Transit and to fix and change the urban bus routes. They authorize and cancel the leave of operation for automotive repair shops, exert the control and monitoring of transport companies and dictate standard use of routes, allowed speeds, signaling, zones of parking, zones of loading and unloading and initiate investigations into infractions and crimes related to transit. The department also advances education campaigns on transport.

==== Municipal Cultural Center ====
The Municipal Cultural Center was created for the promotion of cultural development in the Municipality of Cúcuta. It studies to identify the problems and necessities of the Municipality in the cultural field and creates plans and projects to satisfy them. The department promotes the creation of the municipal network of cultural centers, organizes advanced training courses for cultural promoters and leaders and foments study and sociocultural investigation. It creates contracts when it considers studies, works, and investigations of subjects related to the past historical necessity of the city. The center also promotes, elaborates and executes campaigns to conserve the values of the culture cucuteña and the image of the city. It foments literature, the historical test, the plastic, scenic and cinematographic arts and establishes stimuli, economic scholarships and aids for investigators, interpreters, creators, and artists.

==== Legal Department ====
The Legal Department advises the mayor, secretaries of the office, heads of administrative departments and managers of institutions decentralized in relation to their performances. It also deals with acquittal of the legal consultations, guarding the fulfillment of legal norms that regulate the Mayorship, reviewing the legal and constitutional aspects of projects in agreements, contracts, decrees and resolutions, and to take care of the managements judicial processes and diligences that are in the interest of the municipality.

==== Internal Control ====
The Office of Internal Control was created under the legal frame of Law 87 of November 29, 1993, according to the order in the Political Constitution of Colombia, or April 15, 1996 according to resolution no. 0503. The Committee of Coordination of Internal Control undergoes joint work with the Mayor, Secretary General, Director of Planning and the Director of the Office of internal Control, to coordinate the objectives, policies, plans, input and functions of the dependencies of the Municipal Mayorship of Cúcuta.

===== Objectives =====
The objectives of the Internal Control are defined clearly in Law 87/93:

- To protect the resources of the organization for suitable administration.
- To guarantee the effectiveness, the efficiency and the economy in all the operations, promoting and ensuring the correct completion of the functions and activities.
- To guard activities and resources of the organization to the fulfillment of the objectives of the organization.
- To guarantee the correct evaluation and pursuit of the management of the organization.
- To define and to apply measures to prevent risks, detect and correct deviations that appear and can affect the profit of the objectives of the Municipality.
- To have mechanisms of verification and evaluation that are owned by the Internal Control.
- To guard the organization processes of planning and mechanisms of the design and development of the organization.
