= Villa del Rosario, Norte de Santander =

Villa del Rosario
- Municipality and city
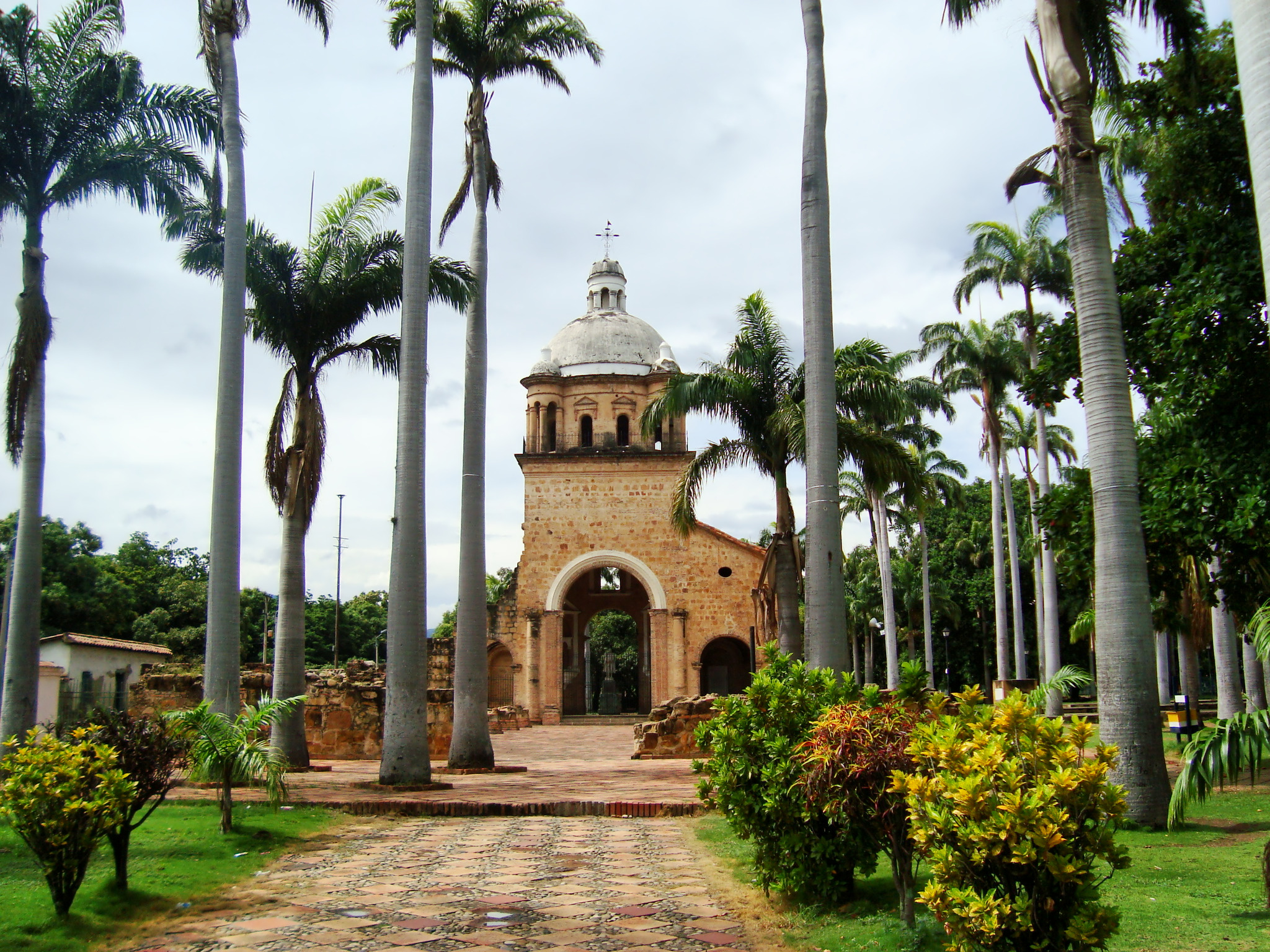
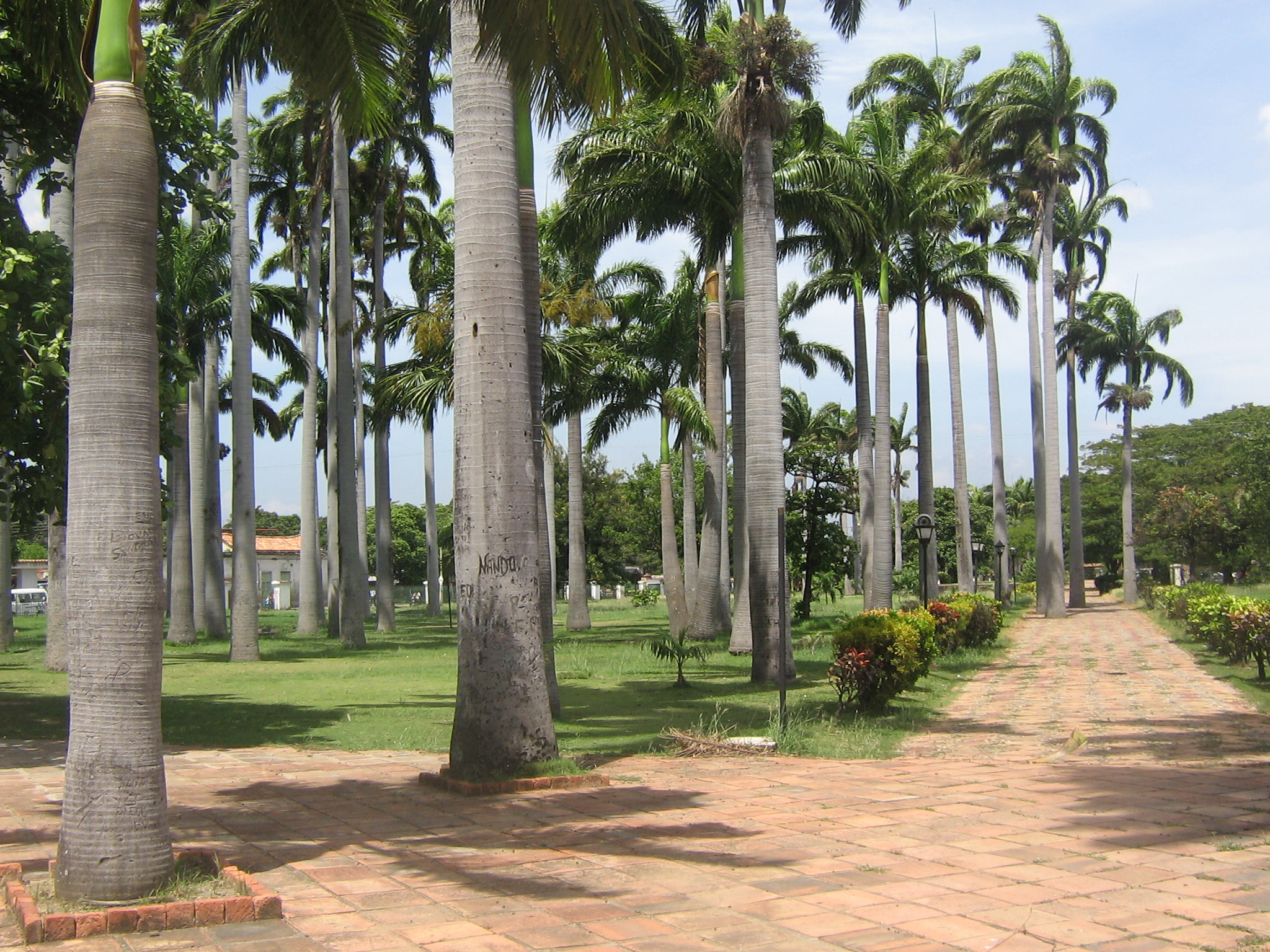
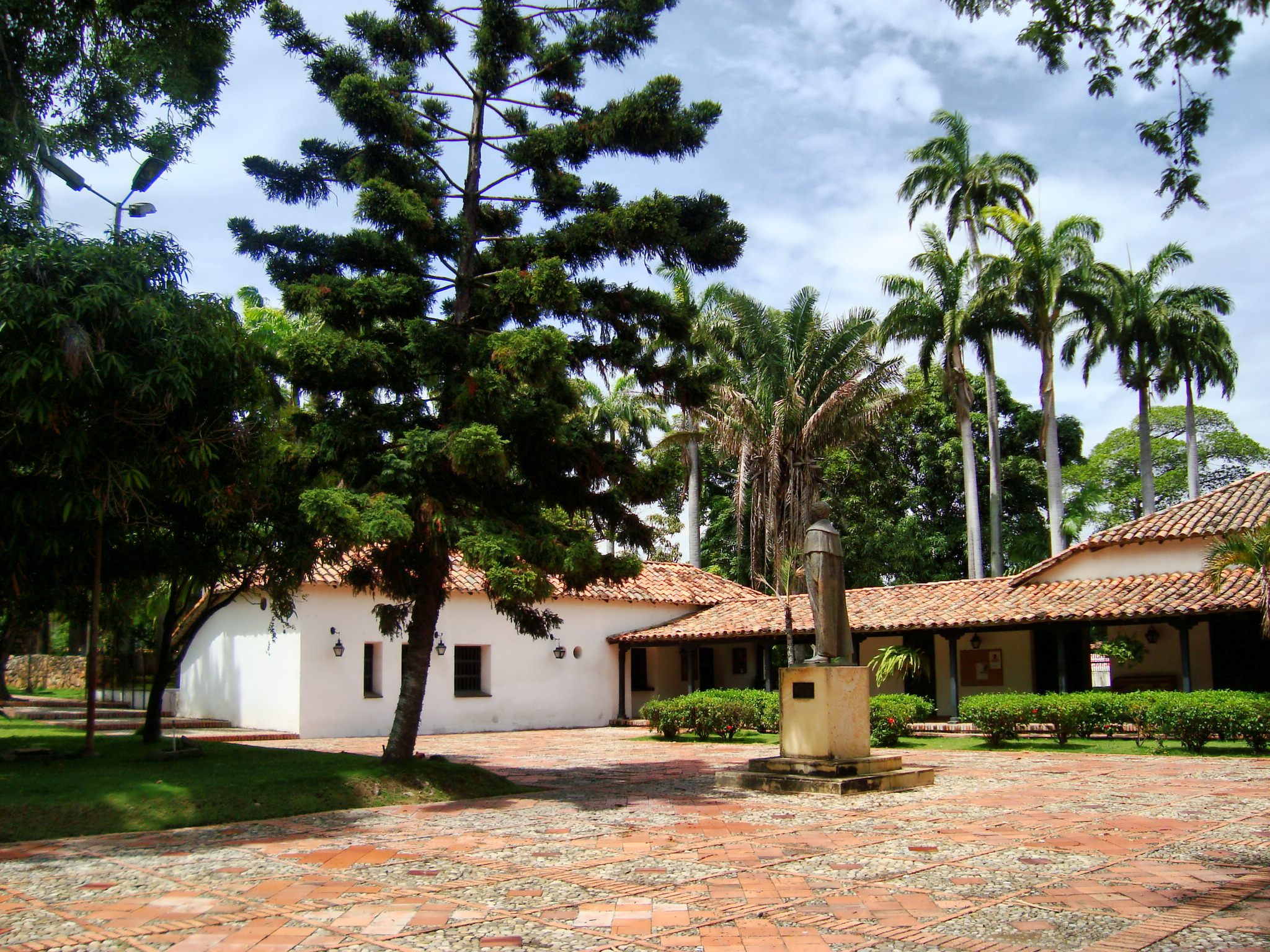
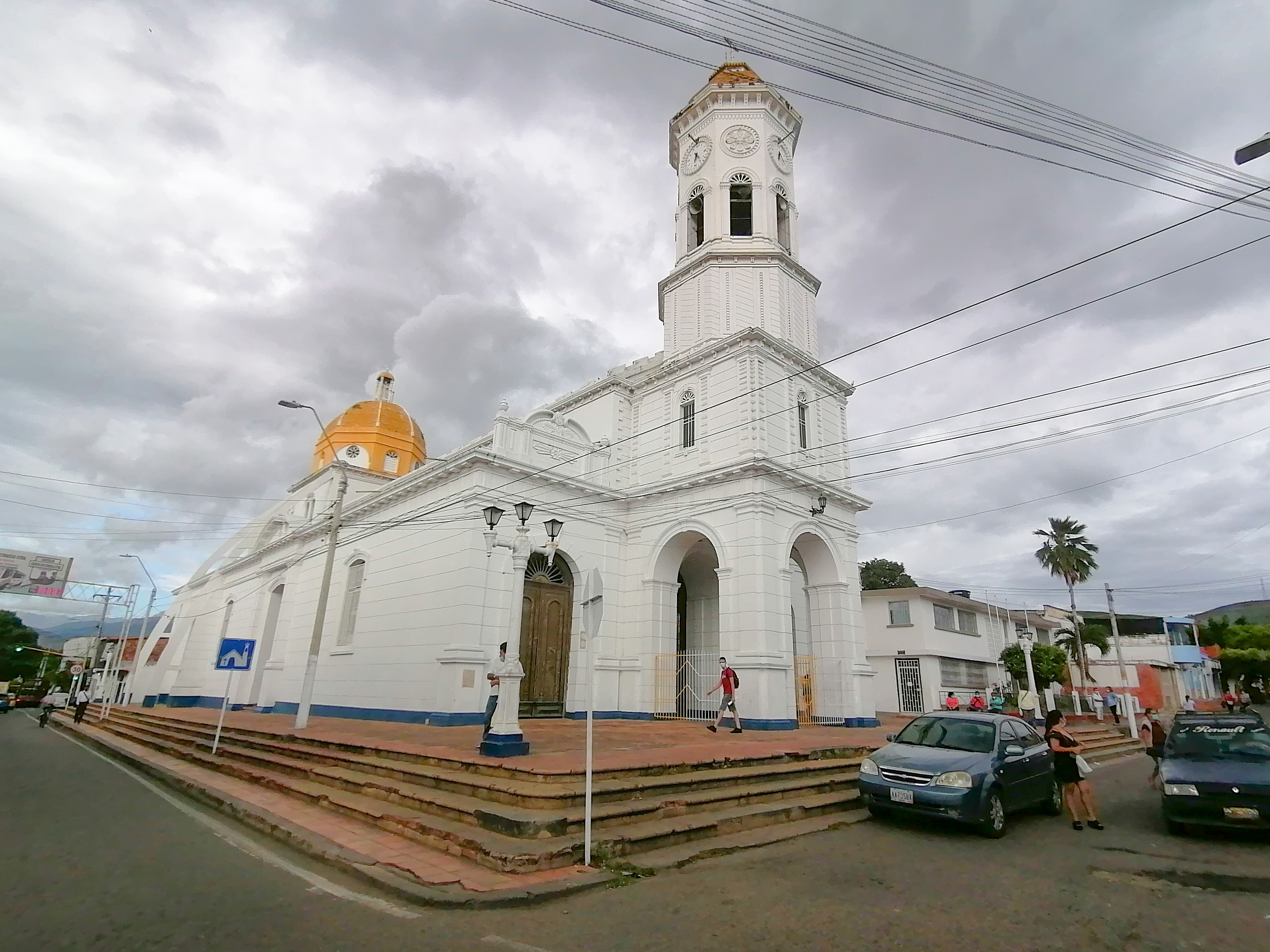
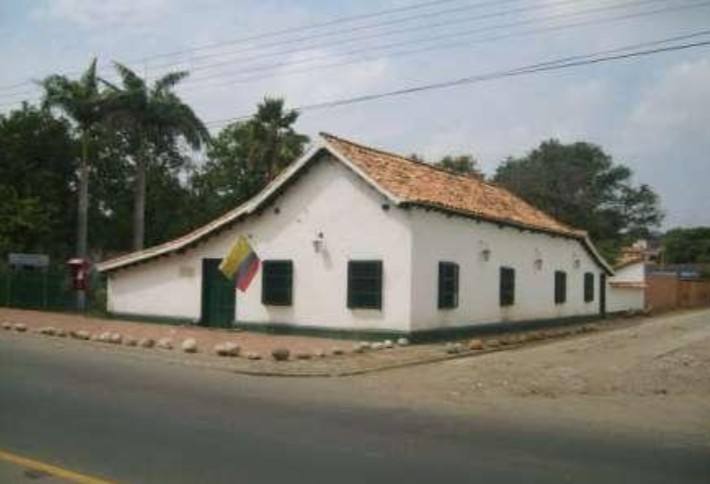
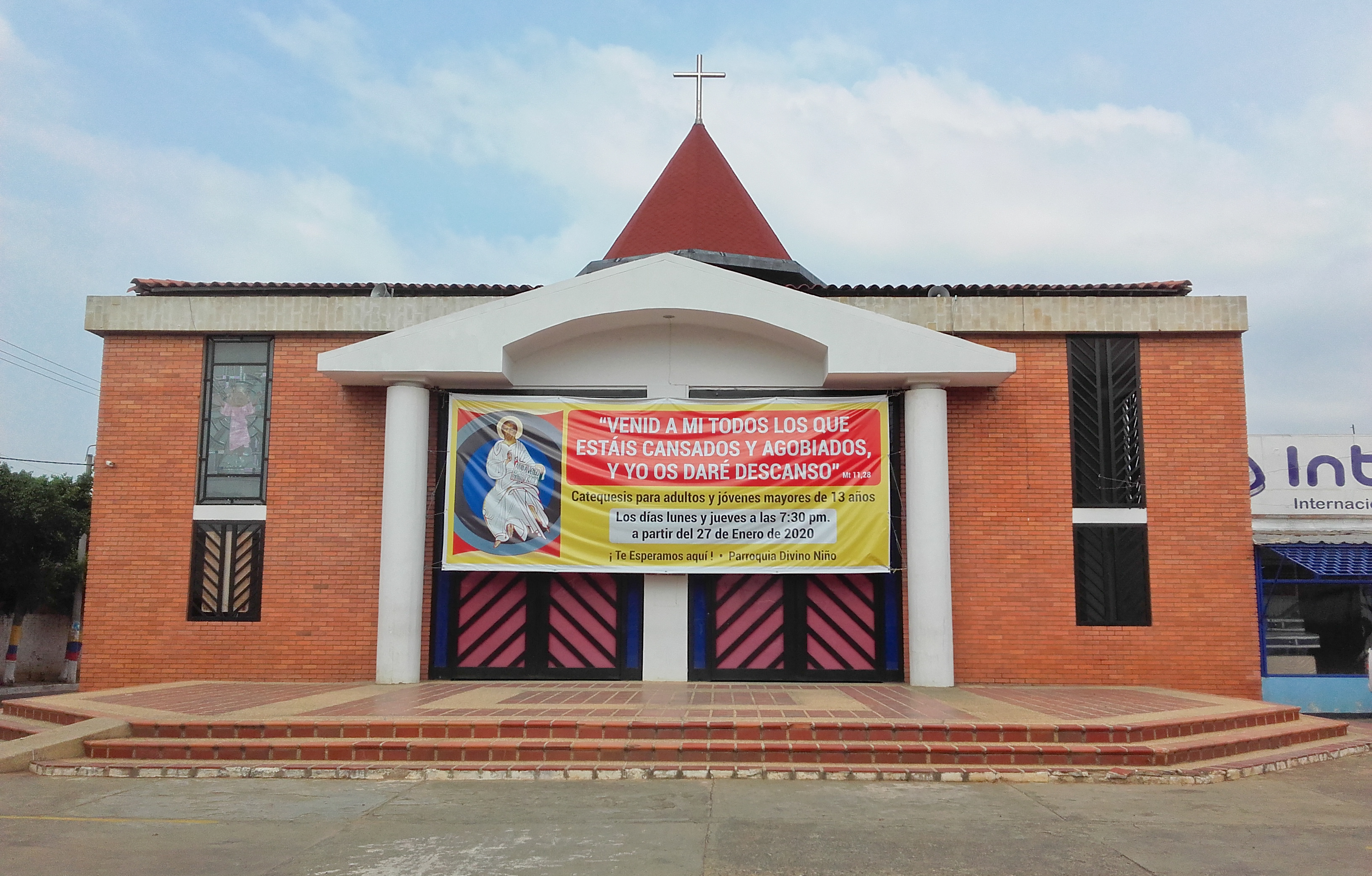
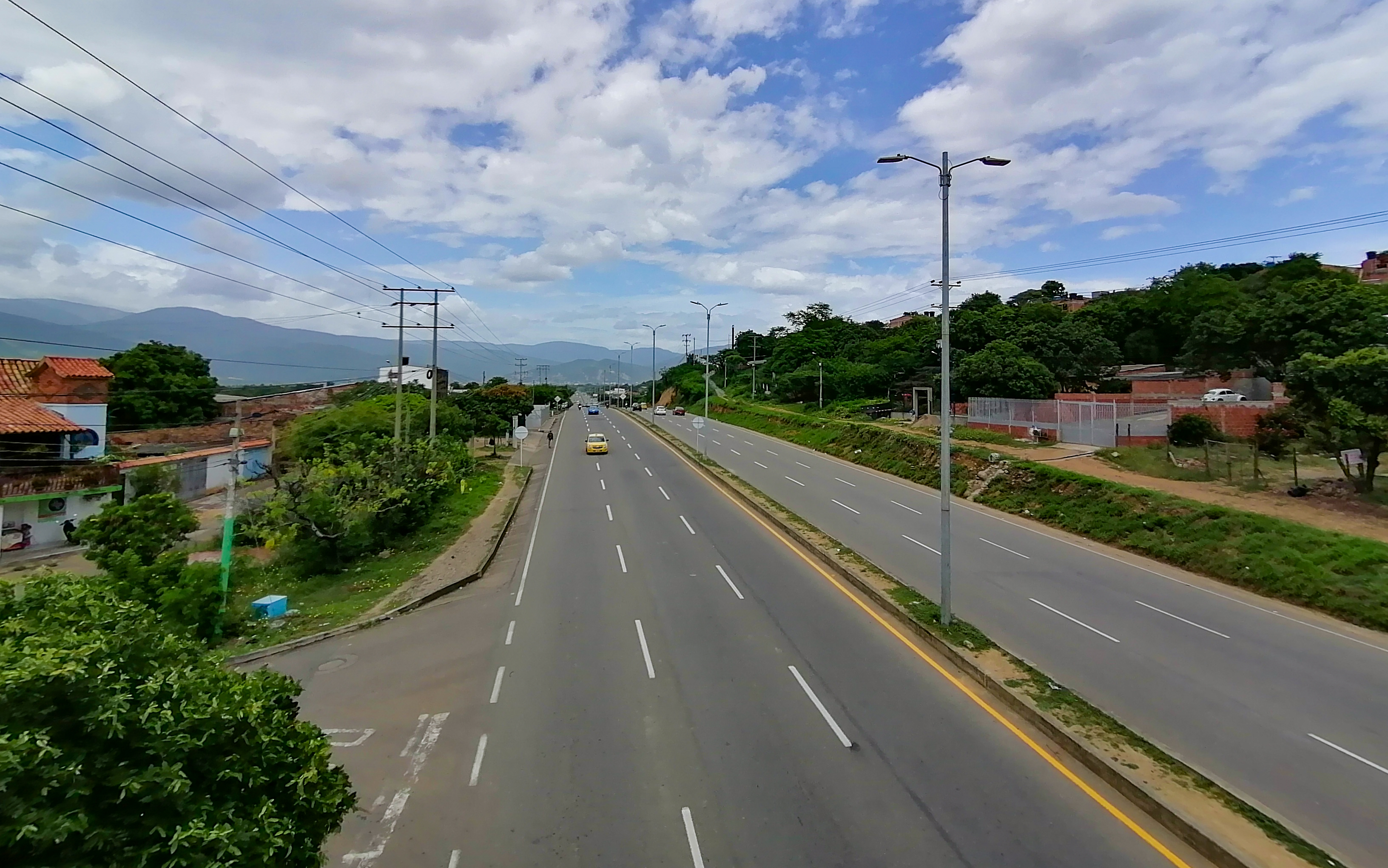

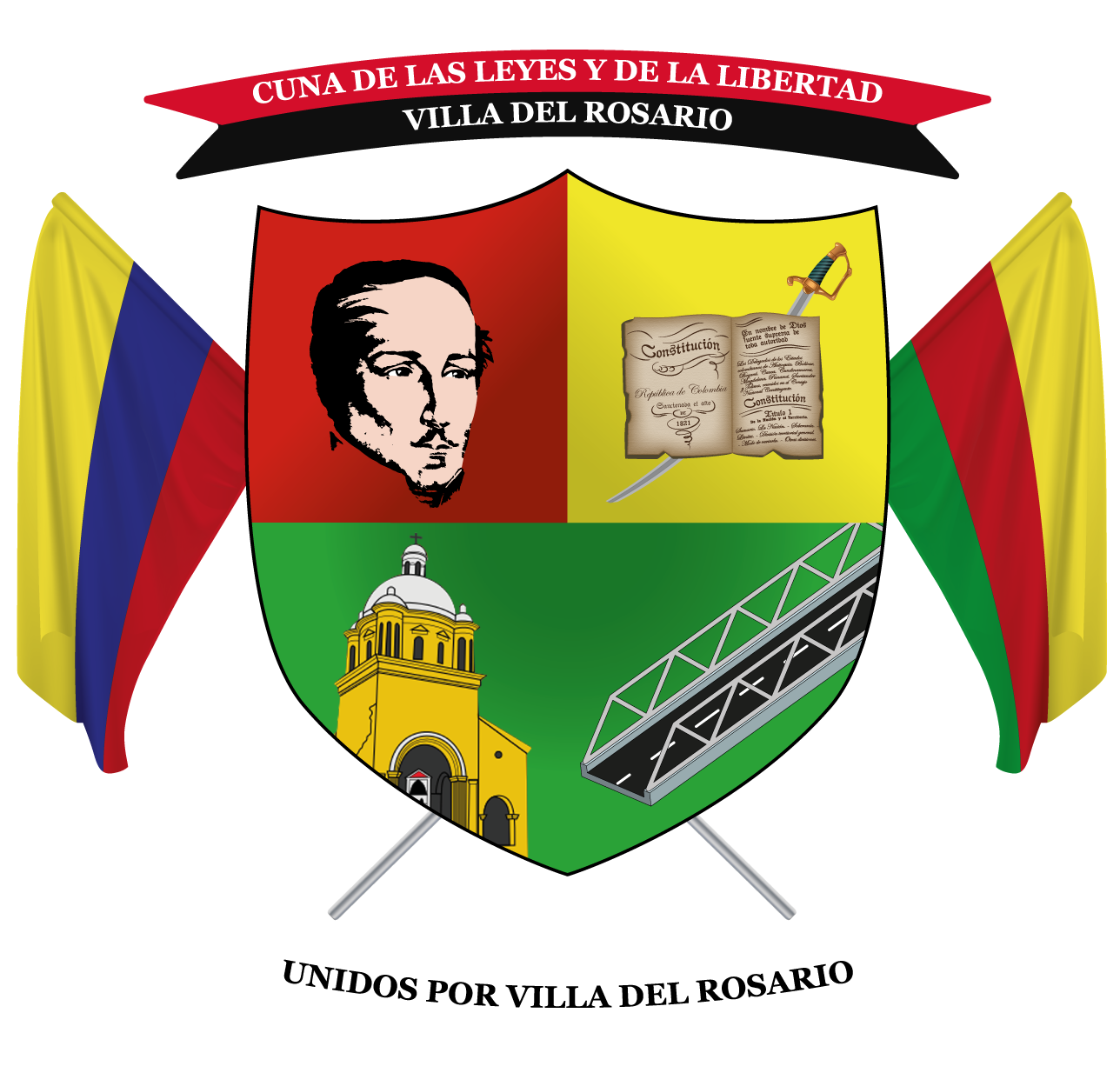
- Flag Coat of arms
- Nicknames: Land of the man of laws, capital of Gran Colombia and bell tower of freedom
- Motto: Noble, faithful and courageous villa

- Location within Colombia
- Coordinates: 7°50′02″N 72°28′27″W
- Country: Colombia
- Department: Norte de Santander^{*}
- Foundation: 1761

Government
  - Mayor: Eugenio Rangel

Area
  - Municipality and city: 90.62 km^{2} (34.99 sq mi)
  - Urban: 18.72 km^{2} (7.23 sq mi)
- Elevation: 440 m (1,440 ft)

Population (2020 est.)
  - Municipality and city: 111,254
  - Density: 1,228/km^{2} (3,180/sq mi)
  - Urban: 107,991
  - Urban density: 5,769/km^{2} (14,940/sq mi)
  - Metro: 742,689
- Demonym: Rosariense
- Time zone: UTC−5 (COL)
- Area code: 57 + 7
- Website: Official website (in Spanish)

Villa del Rosario is a Colombian municipality and city located in the eastern part of North Santander department. It is part of the Metropolitan Area of Cúcuta. The municipality is bordered to the north by Venezuela and the municipality of Cúcuta, to the south by the municipalities of Ragonvalia and Chinácota, to the east by Venezuela and to the west by the municipality of Los Patios.

== Basic information ==
- Founder: Ascencia Rodríguez de Morales y José Díaz de Austudillo.
- Population: 111,254
- Elevation: 320 m above sea-level
- Area: 228 km^{2}
- Climate: 26 °C
- Distance to Cúcuta: 4 km
- Coordinates: 72° 28' O / 7° 50' N
- Rivers: Táchira River.

== History ==
Historians agree that the founder was Don Asencio Rodriguez in 1750.

Around 1760 several farms were established in the area now known as "the Old Rosary". Some of the most important residents in the valleys held a meeting on 15 July 1771 with the intention of formalising the creation of the parish. They petitioned the Spanish monarch Carlos IV, to be granted the title of Villa for the settlement.

Consequently, on 18 May 1792, the title of "Noble, Leal y Valerosa Villa" was granted by Royal Warrant to the parish of Our Lady of the Rosary. Villa del Rosario contributed many great men, most notably General Francisco de Paula Santander, famous as a soldier and legislator, whose achievements in the Revolution and the formation of the Republic made him prominent in public administration and the founding of Colombia's particular form of democracy.

El Rosario is the cradle of Colombia. The gospel was instructed within its temple, it was there that the new homeland of Gran Colombia was born and it was also the seat of the Congress of 1821. Cradle of Francisco de Paula Santander, also called "the man of the laws", who gave Colombia the Constitution of Cúcuta, also known as the Constitution of Great Colombia or the Constitution of 1821. It was the result of the Congress of Cúcuta that was held on August 30, 1821 and whose main objective was to create the Republic of Colombia (better known as Great Colombia) through the unification of New Granada and Venezuela. Ecuador would join later.

A great variety of heroes were born in its lands, among them General Francisco de Paula Santander, Colonel Pedro Fortoul, Colonel José Concha, the philosopher Frutos Joaquin Guitierrez de Caviedes and the priest Nicolas Mauricio de Omaña, (both signers of the act of independence 1810) and many other heroes who gave their lives for the freedom of Colombia

Villa del Rosario also gave rise to great people such as, for example, the historian Luis Gabriel Castro (creator of the book Traveling through the capital of Gran Colombia, the mathematician Manuel Antonio Rueda Jara (nationally recognized for his contributions to education and creator of some books such as The Toy of Numbers and Mercantile Accounting).

== Economy ==
- Agriculture: Sugar, coffee, rice, cane, banana, tobacco, vegetables and fruit trees.
- Cattle: Bovine, bovine and poultries.
- Mining: Coal, clay, plaster and limestone stone.

== Tourist sites ==
- House of Santander
- Historical tamarind
- Park of the Great Colombia

== Climate ==
This area typically has a pronounced dry season. According to the Köppen Climate Classification system, Villa del Rosario has a tropical savanna climate, abbreviated "Aw" on climate maps.
