= List of mountains in Colombia =

== Highest mountains ==
This is a list of the known highest mountains in Colombia, with an elevation of at least 4000 meters above sea level and a topographic prominence of at least 200 meters. (Note: There may be other mountains that satisfy these criteria but are missing from this list because one of the characteristics (e.g. elevation or prominence) have not been measured or published yet.)

Elevations of 4000–4500, 4500–5000, and 5000+ meters approximately correspond to the superparamo, nival, and glacial biomes in Colombia, respectively. In the superparamo zone, conditions are generally cold, wet, and windy; most precipitation falls as rain, while snow is occasional. In the colder nival zone, snow and rain are frequent and can occur throughout the year. In the coldest glacial zone, precipitation falls predominantly as snow, ice can accumulate, and glaciers form. The boundaries between these zones vary due to local climatic conditions, and have also changed over time. In the 20th century, glaciers were recorded reaching as low as 4000 meters above sea level. Snow below 4000 meters is rare.

Rank	Mountain peak	Elevation (m)	Prominence (m)	Coordinates	Range
1	Simon Bolivar & Cristóbal Colón (twin peaks)	5730	5529	10.8388°N 73.6866°W	Santa Marta
2	Pico Simmonds	5600	236	10.8405°N 73.7056°W	Santa Marta
3	Pico La Reina	5535	652	10.8142°N 73.6154°W	Santa Marta
4	Pico Ojeda	5419	544	10.8316°N 73.6265°W	Santa Marta
5	Ritacuba Blanco	5410	3652	6.4944°N 72.2977°W	Eastern Andes
6	Nevado del Huila	5390	2654	2.9236°N 76.0271°W	Central Andes
7	Ritacuba Negro	5340	212	6.5036°N 72.3011°W	Eastern Andes
8	Nevado del Ruiz	5321	2056	4.8831°N 75.3178°W	Central Andes
9	San Pablin Sur	5290	456	6.4430°N 72.2806°W	Eastern Andes
10	Pan de Azucar	5250	551	6.3694°N 72.2951°W	Eastern Andes
11	Pico Tulio Ospina	5275	234	10.8415°N 73.5866°W	Santa Marta
12	Nevado del Tolima	5215	1238	4.6594°N 75.3298°W	Central Andes
13	Pico Guardian	5173	664	10.7870°N 73.6400°W	Santa Marta
14	El Castillo	5170	590	6.4489°N 72.2580°W	Eastern Andes
15	Pico Wilches	5170	244	10.8566°N 73.7112°W	Santa Marta
16	Concavo	5165	413	6.4092°N 72.2819°W	Eastern Andes
17	Pico Blanco	5070	247	6.4598°N 72.2595°W	Eastern Andes
18	Pico San Antonio	5070	228	6.4423°N 72.2604°W	Eastern Andes
19	Pico Aguja	5040	348	6.4423°N 72.2604°W	Eastern Andes
20	Toti	5010	253	6.3828°N 72.2806°W	Eastern Andes
21	Nevado de Santa Isabel	4965	530	4.8179°N 75.3652°W	Central Andes
22	Peak 4965	4965	338	10.8794°N 73.7464°W	Santa Marta
23	Campanilla Blanco	4954	299	6.3590°N 72.302°W	Eastern Andes
24	Peak 4905	4905	350	10.7823°N 73.6006°W	Santa Marta
25	Peak 4890	4890	200	10.8443°N 73.7679°W	Santa Marta
26	Cerros de la Plaza	4865	520	6.3800°N 72.2518°W	Eastern Andes
27	Peak 4865	4865	290	10.8617°N 73.5636°W	Santa Marta
28	Peak 4825	4825	375	10.8850°N 73.5545°W	Santa Marta
29	Peak 4824	4824	340	10.7701°N 73.5793°W	Santa Marta
30	Peak 4805	4805	337	10.8891°N 73.5695°W	Santa Marta
31	Peak 4775	4775	415	6.6870°N 72.3065°W	Eastern Andes
32	Cerro Griere	4771	230	10.9000°N 73.5829°W	Santa Marta
33	Cumbal	4764	1578	0.9555°N 77.8868°W	Western Andes
34	Nevado del Quindío	4760	390	4.7014°N 75.3855°W	Central Andes
35	Chiles	4756	914	0.8165°N 77.9372°W	Western Andes
36	Peak 4745	4745	230	10.7522°N 73.5950°W	Santa Marta
37	Cerro Kubaruwa	4742	382	6.6721°N 72.3348°W	Eastern Andes
38	Cerro Norte	4730	333	6.5838°N 72.3695°W	Eastern Andes
39	Peak 4706	4706	200	10.7609°N 73.5993°W	Santa Marta
40	Peña Colorada	4705	208	6.6390°N 72.3403°W	Eastern Andes
41	Nevado El Cisne	4700	250	4.8428°N 75.3453°W	Central Andes
42	Cerro Sur	4698	276	6.5342°N 72.3662°W	Eastern Andes
43	Campanilla Negro	4680	204	6.3597°N 72.3217°W	Eastern Andes
44	Volcan Pan de Acuzar	4670	1413	2.2702°N 76.3605°W	Central Andes
45	Pico Escarcha	4667	500	6.5014°N 72.1225°W	Eastern Andes
46	Puracé	4650	347	2.3118°N 76.3933°W	Central Andes
47	Cuchilla Patiobolas	4635	263	6.3381°N 72.2803°W	Eastern Andes
48	Cerro Tapado	4635	222	6.7161°N 72.3259°W	Eastern Andes
49	Filo de Siraca	4615	444	6.5306°N 72.1805°W	Eastern Andes
50	Cerro Manare	4606	414	6.3176°N 72.2915°W	Eastern Andes
51	Peak 4605	4605	330	10.7583°N 73.6808°W	Santa Marta
52	Paramillo de Santa Rosa	4600	515	4.7992°N 75.4550°W	Central Andes
53	Peak 4595	4595	270	6.4628°N 72.1750°W	Eastern Andes
54	Cerro Tres Letras	4593	859	3.5766°N 75.9050°W	Central Andes
55	Peak 4593	4593	238	6.5058°N 72.1756°W	Eastern Andes
56	Peak 4593b	4593	238	6.5000°N 72.1700°W	Eastern Andes
57	Peak 4568	4568	253	6.4695°N 72.2131°W	Eastern Andes
58	Peak 4563	4563	292	6.5203°N 72.1139°W	Eastern Andes
59	Volcan Cerro España	4550	205	4.7553°N 75.3719°W	Central Andes
60	Peak 4547	4547	226	6.4725°N 72.1754°W	Eastern Andes
61	Cerro Piedra Molino (La Colorada)	4535	1138	6.9925°N 72.7260°W	Eastern Andes
62	Peak 4485	4485	266	10.7507°N 73.5452°W	Santa Marta
63	Cumbre Unkasia	4484	349	6.9825°N 72.7397°W	Eastern Andes
64	Cerro Negro de Mayasquer	4470	464	0.8241°N 77.9659°W	Western Andes
65	Peak 4450	4450	461	10.8092°N 73.4958°W	Santa Marta
66	Cerro Burinchucua	4450	461	10.8016°N 73.4935°W	Santa Marta
67	Peak 4430	4430	265	6.4372°N 72.1775°W	Eastern Andes
68	Peak 4425	4425	210	10.8614°N 73.8236°W	Santa Marta
69	Peak 4421	4421	328	10.8835°N 73.8752°W	Santa Marta
70	Sotará	4420	1416	2.1088°N 76.5915°W	Central Andes
71	Peak 4415	4415	267	10.8666°N 73.8492°W	Santa Marta
72	Peak 4412	4412	237	6.5244°N 72.2106°W	Eastern Andes
73	Picacho	4380	588	3.5528°N 75.9747°W	Central Andes
74	Cerro Guinawindúa	4360	204	10.8674°N 73.4674°W	Santa Marta
75	Alto Lomas Peladas	4352	402	6.2971°N 72.4502°W	Eastern Andes
76	Peak 4350	4350	425	10.7011°N 73.5931°W	Santa Marta
77	Peak 4330	4330	205	6.4906°N 72.1194°W	Eastern Andes
78	Cerro de Santurbán	4316	979	7.3773°N 72.8450°W	Eastern Andes
79	Peak 4312	4312	287	3.0061°N 76.0156°W	Central Andes
80	Cerro Alto	4305	1441	6.0980°N 72.9241°W	Eastern Andes
81	Peak 4303	4303	213	6.5706°N 72.1111°W	Eastern Andes
82	Peak 4302	4302	356	3.0963°N 76.1032°W	Central Andes
83	Peak 4301	4301	206	6.3450°N 72.2203°W	Eastern Andes
84	Cerro de las Lagrimas	4284	469	3.3277°N 76.0574°W	Central Andes
85	Peak 4280	4280	355	10.7247°N 73.5708°W	Santa Marta
86	Galeras	4276	1136	1.2206°N 77.3580°W	Central Andes
87	Peak 4275	4275	350	10.7247°N 73.5708°W	Santa Marta
88	Peak 4268	4268	293	3.0311°N 76.0772°W	Central Andes
89	Cerro Cinchona	4267	355	6.7370°N 72.4911°W	Eastern Andes
90	Punta Aguda	4265	327	10.9050°N 73.8919°W	Santa Marta
91	Nevado del Sumapaz	4250	1594	3.9348°N 74.1101°W	Eastern Andes
92	Cumbre Coya	4247	403	3.4921°N 75.9995°W	Central Andes
93	Punta de la Florida	4246	226	3.5751°N 75.9895°W	Central Andes
94	Peak 4245	4245	395	10.9272°N 73.3842°W	Santa Marta
95	Cerro Surivaca	4240	279	10.8484°N 73.4295°W	Santa Marta
96	Punta Pijao	4235	440	3.6345°N 75.9929°W	Central Andes
97	Peak 4235	4235	390	0.9042°N 77.9219°W	Western Andes
98	Peak 4234	4234	269	6.4603°N 72.1408°W	Eastern Andes
99	Cerro La Piramide	4230	200	4.6559°N 75.3753°W	Central Andes
100	Cuchilla El Triunfo	4218	351	3.3466°N 75.9708°W	Central Andes
101	Peak 4216	4216	246	3.0931°N 76.1258°W	Central Andes
102	Peak 4215	4215	370	3.1192°N 76.0108°W	Central Andes
103	Picos de Merida	4215	290	10.7124°N 73.5528°W	Santa Marta
104	Peak 4212	4212	1600	0.5225°N 77.4672°W	Eastern Andes
105	Peak 4212b	4212	217	3.0420°N 76.0419°W	Central Andes
106	Peak 4211	4211	285	3.7089°N 75.9580°W	Central Andes
107	Peak 4207	4207	212	3.7203°N 75.9717°W	Central Andes
108	Peak 4195	4195	335	3.4988°N 76.0330°W	Central Andes
109	Peak 4195b	4195	270	3.2578°N 76.0178°W	Central Andes
110	La Cuchilla	4194	442	3.5324°N 75.9224°W	Central Andes
111	Cerro Las Brisas	4190	266	3.6709°N 75.9263°W	Central Andes
112	Las Ánimas	4184	1239	1.5677°N 76.8572°W	Central Andes
113	Saliente del Guape	4180	1819	3.7151°N 74.0423°W	Eastern Andes
114	Pico San Mateo	4180	502	4.0208°N 74.2658°W	Eastern Andes
115	Peak 4180	4180	200	3.0314°N 76.0053°W	Central Andes
116	Peak 4177	4177	337	3.1352°N 76.0259°W	Central Andes
117	Peak 4176	4176	353	3.2009°N 76.0901°W	Central Andes
118	Peak 4176b	4176	331	3.5222°N 76.0022°W	Central Andes
119	Cuchilla Las Torres	4175	230	3.5064°N 76.0464°W	Central Andes
120	Pico Guardian del Llano	4175	428	3.9156°N 74.1195°W	Eastern Andes
121	Pico La Laguna	4170	445	6.1928°N 72.8788°W	Eastern Andes
122	Peak 4169	4169	310	3.5004°N 76.0310°W	Central Andes
123	Peak 4161	4161	237	3.4663°N 76.0274°W	Central Andes
124	Peak 4160	4160	288	7.2953°N 72.8458°W	Eastern Andes
125	Peak 4160b	4160	247	3.4590°N 76.0473°W	Central Andes
126	Peak 4160c	4160	247	3.4572°N 76.0558°W	Central Andes
127	Doña Juana	4159	815	1.4998°N 76.9360°W	Central Andes
128	Cerrito Cucu	4156	374	3.7802°N 75.8008°W	Central Andes
129	Peak 4155	4155	240	10.6839°N 73.5972°W	Santa Marta
130	Peak 4155b	4155	230	3.6774°N 75.9494°W	Central Andes
131	Peak 4150	4150	415	3.6639°N 75.9017°W	Central Andes
132	Peak 4150b	4150	285	3.7839°N 75.8242°W	Central Andes
133	Peak 4150c	4150	231	3.2659°N 76.0827°W	Central Andes
134	Peak 4150d	4150	223	3.2324°N 76.0827°W	Central Andes
135	Peak 4149	4149	378	3.7410°N 74.3990°W	Eastern Andes
136	Peak 4149b	4149	217	3.6666°N 75.9563°W	Central Andes
137	Peak 4149c	4149	214	3.6570°N 75.9756°W	Central Andes
138	Peak 4148	4148	273	3.2117°N 76.0392°W	Central Andes
139	Pico Pedro de Limpias	4147	460	3.8894°N 74.1339°W	Eastern Andes
140	Peak 4147	4147	402	3.2317°N 75.9875°W	Central Andes
141	Peak 4145	4145	320	3.8493°N 75.8943°W	Central Andes
142	Peak 4145b	4145	240	0.8720°N 77.9492°W	Western Andes
143	Los Tambos de Colorado	4140	363	3.7408°N 74.3993°W	Eastern Andes
144	Peak 4135	4135	230	7.0450°N 72.8354°W	Eastern Andes
145	Peak 4135b	4135	210	3.8378°N 75.9094°W	Central Andes
146	Alto Landinez	4125	305	5.8909°N 72.7103°W	Eastern Andes
147	Peak 4124	4124	374	3.7086°N 75.8017°W	Central Andes
148	El Morro del Viejo	4119	209	6.2214°N 72.8671°W	Eastern Andes
149	Peak 4115	4115	250	3.3397°N 75.9372°W	Central Andes
150	Peak 4110	4110	665	0.6139°N 77.3861°W	Eastern Andes
151	Peak 4109	4109	394	3.6806°N 75.7631°W	Central Andes
152	Cerro Sucubún	4108	728	2.0178°N 76.5740°W	Central Andes
153	Pico el Arenal	4107	648	5.9143°N 72.6691°W	Eastern Andes
154	Cerro Mahoma	4107	284	6.3727°N 72.4778°W	Eastern Andes
155	Peak 4103	4103	238	3.7747°N 75.8506°W	Central Andes
156	Cuchilla Hermosura	4100	319	3.8269°N 74.3271°W	Eastern Andes
157	Peak 4100	4100	319	3.8150°N 74.3175°W	Eastern Andes
158	Peak 4097	4097	273	3.7541°N 75.9161°W	Central Andes
159	Peak 4095	4095	250	10.9183°N 73.3555°W	Santa Marta
160	Peak 4092	4092	217	10.6789°N 73.6360°W	Santa Marta
161	Peak 4076	4076	201	6.2425°N 72.3850°W	Eastern Andes
162	Azufral	4070	916	1.0859°N 77.7192°W	Western Andes
163	Peak 4065	4065	720	1.8680°N 76.5900°W	Central Andes
164	Cerro Tatamá	4064	2299	5.1655°N 76.0958°W	Western Andes
165	Peak 4061	4061	200	3.6811°N 75.7917°W	Central Andes
166	Peak 4055	4055	350	1.8982°N 76.5803°W	Central Andes
167	Cerro Angimaloa	4055	249	10.9665°N 73.3607°W	Santa Marta
168	Pico Nicolas de Federmann	4054	248	3.9300°N 74.1454°W	Eastern Andes
169	Cerro Gobernador	4053	251	3.9706°N 74.2924°W	Eastern Andes
170	Cerro San Luis	4051	1132	4.4506°N 73.7641°W	Eastern Andes
171	Pico Pance	4050	2314	3.3440°N 76.6961°W	Western Andes
172	Volcan Gordo	4050	435	2.0925°N 76.5650°W	Central Andes
173	Cerro Orinoco (Ocho Loros)	4047	475	4.0350°N 75.7248°W	Central Andes
174	Peak 4045	4045	200	3.5482°N 75.9044°W	Central Andes
175	Cerro Boquerón	4039	321	3.3250°N 75.9232°W	Central Andes
176	Peak 4039 (Ocho Loros)	4039	224	4.0211°N 75.7322°W	Central Andes
177	Alto Muysca	4038	252	3.9206°N 74.3058°W	Eastern Andes
178	Peak 4035	4035	340	4.0990°N 75.7430°W	Central Andes
179	Peak 4033	4033	335	6.8669°N 72.4909°W	Eastern Andes
180	Cerro Guanentá	4031	251	5.9829°N 73.0823°W	Eastern Andes
181	Peak 4030	4030	335	4.0597°N 75.7417°W	Central Andes
182	Peak 4029	4029	259	6.2606°N 72.8884°W	Eastern Andes
183	Peak 4029b	4029	214	3.7769°N 74.3764°W	Eastern Andes
184	Peak 4023	4023	278	3.4317°N 76.0239°W	Central Andes
185	Cerro Peña del Alumbre	4023	222	4.4679°N 73.7567°W	Eastern Andes
186	Pico San Nicolás	4020	2048	5.7586°N 76.0617°W	Western Andes
187	Peak 4020	4020	370	6.9086°N 72.5022°W	Eastern Andes
188	Cerro León	4019	435	10.9682°N 73.5827°W	Santa Marta
189	Peak 4019	4019	350	4.0797°N 74.0995°W	Eastern Andes
190	Petacas	4018	478	1.6211°N 76.8425°W	Central Andes
191	Peak 4018	4018	240	3.9602°N 74.1434°W	Eastern Andes
192	Alto Campana (Paramo Frontino)	4015	2555	6.4568°N 76.1225°W	Western Andes
193	Alto El Piedrepacho	4015	417	6.0792°N 72.5469°W	Eastern Andes
194	Peak 4015	4015	310	2.9758°N 75.9689°W	Central Andes
195	Peak 4014 (Ocho Loros)	4014	200	4.0180°N 75.7109°W	Central Andes
196	Peak 4012	4012	1181	7.6597°N 72.9631°W	Eastern Andes
197	Cerro Chibcha	4005	240	4.0902°N 74.2700°W	Eastern Andes
198	Peak 4001	4001	306	4.0795°N 74.0992°W	Eastern Andes
199	Cerro Bravo	4000	568	5.0885°N 75.2926°W	Central Andes
200	Peak 4000 (Ocho Loros)	4000	225	3.9970°N 75.7447°W	Central Andes

(Note: Most entries in these tables come from the Peak Visor online map, which is generally reliable. In some cases, however, the Peak Visor label is off-center from the actual summit and their database thus states an inaccurate elevation and prominence. In such cases, we estimate the true summit elevation and prominence based on Peak Visor's contour lines. For example: Mountain X is listed on Peak Visor as having an elevation of 4100 meters and a prominence of 200 meters, but its label is incorrectly placed on the slope of the mountain. The real summit lies between Peak Visor's 4120m and 4130 contour lines. On this Wikipedia page, the mountain is thus listed as having an intermediate elevation of 4125 meters, and a prominence of 225 meters (200+25). These corrections have been made to some entries, but there may be more that need similar correction.) (Note: Peaks that lack a name in the Peak Visor or Peakbagger websites are listed on this page generically with their elevation as an identifier. For example, if an unnamed peak has an elevation of 4013 meters, it is listed as "Peak 4013." These temporary names can be replaced if additional sources can be found that name them explicitly. If there are two unnamed mountains of identical heights, they are distinguished with letters: for example, "Peak 4013a" and "Peak 4013b".)

== Most prominent mountains ==
This is a list of all known mountains in Colombia that have a topographic prominence of at least 600 meters.

Rank	Mountain peak	Prominence (m)	Elevation (m)	Coordinates	Range	Sub-range/area
1	Simon Bolivar & Cristóbal Colón (twin peaks)	5529	5730	10.8346°N 73.6917°W	Santa Marta	
2	Ritacuba Blanco	3652	5410	6.4944°N 72.2977°W	Eastern Andes	Sierra Nevada del Cocuy
3	Nevado del Huila	2654	5390	2.9236°N 76.0271°W	Central Andes	
4	Alto Campana	2555	4015	6.4568°N 76.1225°W	Western Andes	Paramo Frontino
5	Pico Pance (Punta Pance)	2314	4050	3.3440°N 76.6961°W	Western Andes	Farallones de Cali
6	Cerro Tatamá	2299	4064	5.1655°N 76.0958°W	Western Andes	Paramo Tatama
7	Cerro Calima	2242	3840	4.0694°N 76.5237°W	Western Andes	
8	Cerro Pintado	2186	3660	10.3359°N 72.9050°W	Eastern Andes	Serranía del Perijá
9	Nevado del Ruiz	2056	5321	4.8831°N 75.3178°W	Central Andes	Los Nevados
10	Pico San Nicolas	2048	4020	5.7586°N 76.0617°W	Western Andes	Farallones del Citará
11	Cerro Napi	1822	3845	2.3789°N 77.4338°W	Western Andes	Serranía del Pinche
12	Saliente del Guape	1819	4165	3.7151°N 74.0423°W	Eastern Andes	
13	Cerro San Lucas	1693	2262	8.1126°N 74.2720°W	Central Andes	Serranía de San Lucas
14	Cerro El Triunfo	1680	3605	2.9130°N 74.8511°W	Eastern Andes	
15	Cordillera De Los Cobardes	1660	3414	6.4622°N 73.4442°W	Eastern Andes	Serranía de los Yariguíes
16	Cerro Torra	1654	2810	4.7823°N 76.4952°W	Western Andes	
17	Peak 4212	1600	4212	0.5225°N 77.4672°W	Eastern Andes	
18	Nevado del Sumapaz	1594	4310	3.9348°N 74.1101°W	Eastern Andes	
19	Cerro Paramillo	1588	3721	7.1028°N 75.9689°W	Western Andes	Paramillo Massif
20	Cumbal Volcano	1578	4764	0.9555°N 77.8868°W	Western Andes	
21	Alto de Nique	1552	1724	7.7015°N 77.7274°W	Serranía del Baudó–Los Saltos	Serranía de Pirre
22	Cerro Kennedy	1499	2852	11.1125°N 74.0344°W	Santa Marta	
23	Alto Cristo	1482	3377	6.7784°N 75.6926°W	Central Andes	
24	Cerro de las Jurisdicciones	1475	3850	7.8468°N 73.2260°W	Eastern Andes	
25	Cerro Alto	1441	4305	6.0980°N 72.9241°W	Eastern Andes	
26	Alto Concordia	1420	3720	6.0034°N 76.0977°W	Western Andes	
27	Sotará	1416	4420	2.1088°N 76.5915°W	Central Andes	
28	Cerro Chiolaque	1416	2611	10.6465°N 73.3811°W	Santa Marta	
29	Volcan Pan de Azucar	1413	4670	2.2702°N 76.3605°W	Central Andes	Sierra de Coconucos
30	Las Ánimas	1239	4184	1.5677°N 76.8572°W	Central Andes	
31	Nevado del Tolima	1238	5216	4.6594°N 75.3298°W	Central Andes	Los Nevados
32	Cerro Miraflores	1223	3341	2.3313°N 75.3643°W	Eastern Andes	
33	Peak 4012	1181	4012	7.6597°N 72.9631°W	Eastern Andes	
34	Cerro Quía	1175	1365	7.5826°N 77.5184°W	Serranía del Baudó–Los Saltos	Serranía de Pirre
35	Cerro Piedra Molino (La Colorada)	1138	4535	6.9925°N 72.7261°W	Eastern Andes	Paramo del Almorzadero
36	Galeras	1136	4276	1.2206°N 77.3580°W	Central Andes	
37	Cerro San Luis	1132	4051	4.4506°N 73.7641°W	Eastern Andes	Serranía de Los Órganos
38	Cerro Quiparadó	1117	1564	6.3960°N 76.5367°W	Western Andes	
39	Cerro Patascoy	1107	3950	0.9436°N 77.0729°W	Eastern Andes	Serranía de los Churumbelos
40	Peak 3609	1095	3609	1.5776°N 77.5759°W	Western Andes	
41	Cuchilla Cerro Negro	1094	2725	4.8729°N 73.3048°W	Eastern Andes	Cuchilla Negra
42	Pico Chimichagua	1092	3855	4.5069°N 73.5756°W	Eastern Andes	
43	Paramo Bagueche	1072	3903	7.6480°N 72.9542°W	Eastern Andes	Paramo de Santurban
44	Cerro Bravo	1013	2650	5.9375°N 75.7023°W	Central Andes	
45	Alto De Serna	982	2963	5.2419°N 75.9263°W	Western Andes	
46	Cerro de Santurbán	979	4316	7.3773°N 72.8450°W	Eastern Andes	Paramo de Santurban
47	Cuchilla El Espartillo	974	3165	7.8972°N 72.8985°W	Eastern Andes	Paramo de Santurban
48	Cerro Munchique	968	3011	2.5163°N 76.9566°W	Western Andes	
49	Cerro Murrucucu	960	1307	7.9070°N 76.0808°W	Western Andes	Serranía de San Jerónimo
50	Cerro Calarma	948	2887	3.9528°N 75.4263°W	Central Andes	
51	Cerro Cristales	938	3101	5.9660°N 73.8254°W	Eastern Andes	
52	Cerro Pabellon	934	2460	5.0696°N 72.9047°W	Eastern Andes	Las Cuchillas de Palmicha
53	Cerro del Pinche	932	3032	2.5019°N 77.3229°W	Western Andes	Serranía del Pinche
54	Cerro Bobali Central	929	2516	8.8762°N 73.4494°W	Eastern Andes	Cerros de Bobalí
55	Tablón Grande	926	3786	5.2712°N 73.9871°W	Eastern Andes	
56	Loma La Ovehera (Mirador La Gloria)	922	1691	3.5089°N 75.2932°W	Central Andes	
57	Cerro Gongora	920	2028	10.3330°N 73.5484°W	Santa Marta	
58	Azufral	916	4070	1.0859°N 77.7192°W	Western Andes	
59	Chiles	914	4756	0.8165°N 77.9372°W	Western Andes	
60	Cerro San Jose	893	3320	6.2511°N 76.0490°W	Western Andes	
61	Cerro 3090	885	3090	7.3138°N 75.7908°W	Western Andes	Paramillo Massif
62	Alto de Limatón	880	3447	5.7133°N 73.6515°W	Eastern Andes	Cresta de Gallo
63	Cerro Alguacil	860	3042	10.5105°N 73.5610°W	Santa Marta	
64	Cerro Tres Letras	859	4593	3.5766°N 75.9050°W	Central Andes	Las Hermosas
65	Alto del Buey	852	1054	6.0909°N 77.2790°W	Serranía del Baudó–Los Saltos	Serranía del Baudó
66	Cerro Caraucha	845	2175	5.4692°N 74.2473°W	Eastern Andes	
67	Cuchilla San Antonio	836	3119	6.0619°N 75.5805°W	Central Andes	Antioquia Highlands
68	Cerro 3927	834	3927	3.7182°N 76.1140°W	Central Andes	Páramos Las Domínguez
69	Jaika Tuma (Ellausakirandarra / Careperro)	832	1014	7.0362°N 76.6742°W	Western Andes	Uradá Jiguamiandó Hills
70	La Macarena	831	1618	3.1034°N 73.9403°W	Serrania de la Macarena	
71	Cerro Iguaque	828	3825	5.7081°N 73.4239°W	Eastern Andes	Paramo de Iguaque
72	Cerro de Maco	828	900	9.8842°N 75.1938°W	Western Andes	Montes de María
73	Doña Juana	815	4159	1.4998°N 76.9360°W	Central Andes	Doña Juana-Cascabel Volcanic Complex
74	Cuchilla de La Dieciocho	814	2033	10.3515°N 73.7346°W	Santa Marta	
75	Cerro Corcovado	809	1029	8.4294°N 74.4436°W	Central Andes	Serranía de San Lucas
76	Cerro 3370	804	3370	7.1358°N 76.1419°W	Western Andes	Paramillo Massif
77	Cerro Palúa	799	833	12.1705°N 71.3861°W	Serranía de Macuira	
78	Alto de La Cruz	788	2175	4.39271°N 75.25761°W	Central Andes	
79	Cerro Putumayo	786	3289	1.1214°N 76.8765°W	Eastern/ Central Andes	
80	Cerro Pilpé	783	3745	2.2368°N 77.3458°W	Western Andes	Serranía del Pinche
81	Cerro Santana	778	3170	2.6987°N 76.8715°W	Western Andes	Munchique massif
82	Alto Patio Barrido	771	2370	8.2268°N 73.1268°W	Eastern Andes	
83	Alto Piedra Pelona	768	2280	6.0280°N 75.7187°W	Central Andes	Antioquia Highlands
84	Cerro Morro Plancho	755	3248	5.5630°N 75.7322°W	Western Andes	Cuchilla Jardin-Tamesis
85	Cuchilla San Agustin	752	1949	4.9381°N 73.1239°W	Eastern Andes	Cuchilla de San Agustin
86	Cerro Caño Minas	744	925	2.6377°N 69.2495°W	Guiana Shield	Puinawai Natural Reserve
87	Morro Chajerado	740	1552	6.6960°N 76.5784°W	Western Andes	
88	Cerro Ocaidó	739	2980	6.2021°N 76.2319°W	Western Andes	
89	Alto De La Hocha	734	1599	2.5497°N 75.5849°W	Central Andes	
90	Cerro Tame	732	2713	6.5491°N 71.9011°W	Eastern Andes	
91	Alto Zancudo	730	2574	7.2670°N 75.6778°W	Western Andes	Serranía de Ayapel
92	Cerro Sucubún	728	4108	2.0178°N 76.5740°W	Central Andes	
93	Cerro 3785	727	3785	5.3852°N 73.0165°W	Eastern Andes	Páramo de los Coroneles Zetaquira
94	Serranía de Ayapel	722	3088	7.3236°N 75.8515°W	Western Andes	Serranía de Ayapel
95	Loma El Colegio	722	2028	1.9730°N 75.9919°W	Central Andes	
96	Peak 1675	722	1675	7.7104°N 76.4886°W	Western Andes	Serranía de Abibe
97	Alto Los Manocos	721	2269	8.2543°N 73.2718°W	Eastern Andes	Los Estoraques
98	Peak 4065	720	4065	1.8680°N 76.5900°W	Central Andes	Nudo de Las Papas
99	Cerro La Chapa	715	2110	2.9378°N 76.5742°W	Central / Western Andes	
100	Cerro Gordo	713	1766	4.2655°N 75.1897°W	Central Andes	
101	Cuchilla Tres Pelos	707	3675	4.2902°N 73.7608°W	Eastern Andes	Chingaza
102	Cumbre de Cuchilla Buena Vista	702	1605	4.1697°N 75.2360°W	Central Andes	Cuchilla Buena Vista
103	Alto La Aguja	701	1259	4.7307°N 73.1515°W	Eastern Andes	
104	Cerro Vetas	701	2032	6.0639°N 75.8170°W	Central Andes	Antioquia Highlands
105	Cerro Francisco	697	3518	5.1939°N 73.2956°W	Central Andes	Páramo Mamapacha y Bijagual
106	Cuchilla El Chorro	696	1303	11.0165°N 72.9371°W	Santa Marta	
107	Cerro GEP	693	2929	2.8177°N 76.9188°W	Western Andes	Munchique massif
108	Cerro Mirador	690	2536	3.0425°N 74.6009°W	Eastern Andes	Cordillera de los Picachos
109	Alto El Sandalo	687	3554	5.3954°N 73.5781°W	Eastern Andes	Paramo Rabanal
110	Cerro Zamaricote	686	1324	5.8379°N 72.0492°W	Eastern Andes	Zamaricote ridge, Piedemonte Llanero
111	Cerro Murillo	684	1618	10.5767°N 73.2925°W	Santa Marta	
112	Cerro Negro	683	2105	1.6705°N 75.7245°W	Eastern Andes	Piedemont de Florencia
113	Cuchilla Las Lajas	681	3952	6.1000°N 72.7951°W	Eastern Andes	
114	Cerro Gumpa	680	2559	11.0542°N 73.5254°W	Santa Marta	
115	Cerro La Mesa	677	1971	2.2561°N 75.0683°W	Eastern Andes	
116	Cerro El Hacha	677	2274	8.3001°N 72.9769°W	Eastern Andes	
117	Cerro El Cocuy	674	3221	2.3378°N 77.1485°W	Western Andes	
118	Pico Darién	668	1412	8.4719°N 77.4486°W	Serranía del Darién	
119	Peak 4110	665	4110	0.6139°N 77.3861°W	Eastern Andes	
120	Pico Guardián	664	5100	10.7870°N 73.6400°W	Santa Marta	
121	Loma Peña Blanca	664	2905	5.9132°N 73.4338°W	Eastern Andes	
122	Serrania De San Geronimo	659	1040	7.8204°N 75.9709°W	Western Andes	Serranía de San Jerónimo
123	Cuchilla El Chiflon	656	1844	3.1690°N 75.4022°W	Central Andes	Cuchilla El Chiflon
124	Alto Pan De Azucar	654	2757	4.9220°N 73.2690°W	Eastern Andes	Cuchilla de Guanaque
125	Pico La Reina	652	5510	10.8142°N 73.6154°W	Santa Marta	
126	Cerro Tres Tetas	652	3526	9.9765°N 72.9820°W	Eastern Andes	Serranía del Perijá
127	Peak 1148	650	1148	2.5033°N 73.8797°W	Serrania de la Macarena	
128	Pico El Arenal	648	4107	5.9143°N 72.6691°W	Eastern Andes	
129	Alto Morro Pelado	644	3453	6.6149°N 76.1628°W	Western Andes	Paramo Frontino
130	Alto Paramo Viejo	642	1548	6.9852°N 73.2063°W	Eastern Andes	
131	Cerro del Padre Amaya	642	3113	6.2799°N 75.6866°W	Central Andes	Serranía de las Baldías
132	Cerro Viejo	641	1103	8.1814°N 72.7158°W	Eastern Andes	
133	Alto 1007	640	1007	7.6936°N 75.9725°W	Western Andes	Serranía de San Jerónimo
134	Cerro de la Tabla (Cerro Cone)	634	2286	4.9014°N 74.5664°W	Eastern Andes	
135	Alto del Boquerón	619	3724	5.3547°N 75.2695°W	Central Andes	
136	Peak 2892	619	2892	1.5629°N 76.0987°W	Eastern Andes	Serranía de los Churumbelos
137	Alto El Roble	617	3962	6.2203°N 72.7645°W	Eastern Andes	
138	Alto Telecom	616	3373	5.7143°N 73.8137°W	Eastern Andes	Páramo de Saboyá
139	Peak 3702	615	3702	5.6302°N 76.0117°W	Western Andes	Farallones del Citará
140	Cerro Palmira	613	1601	5.6940°N 75.5783°W	Central Andes	Farallones de La Pintada
141	Cerro De Las Baldias	609	3145	6.3302°N 75.6478°W	Central Andes	Serranía de las Baldías
142	Cumbre de Filo Seco	603	2755	2.6596°N 75.2050°W	Eastern Andes	Filo Seco
