= El Castillo (Columbia) =

Mountain in Colombia

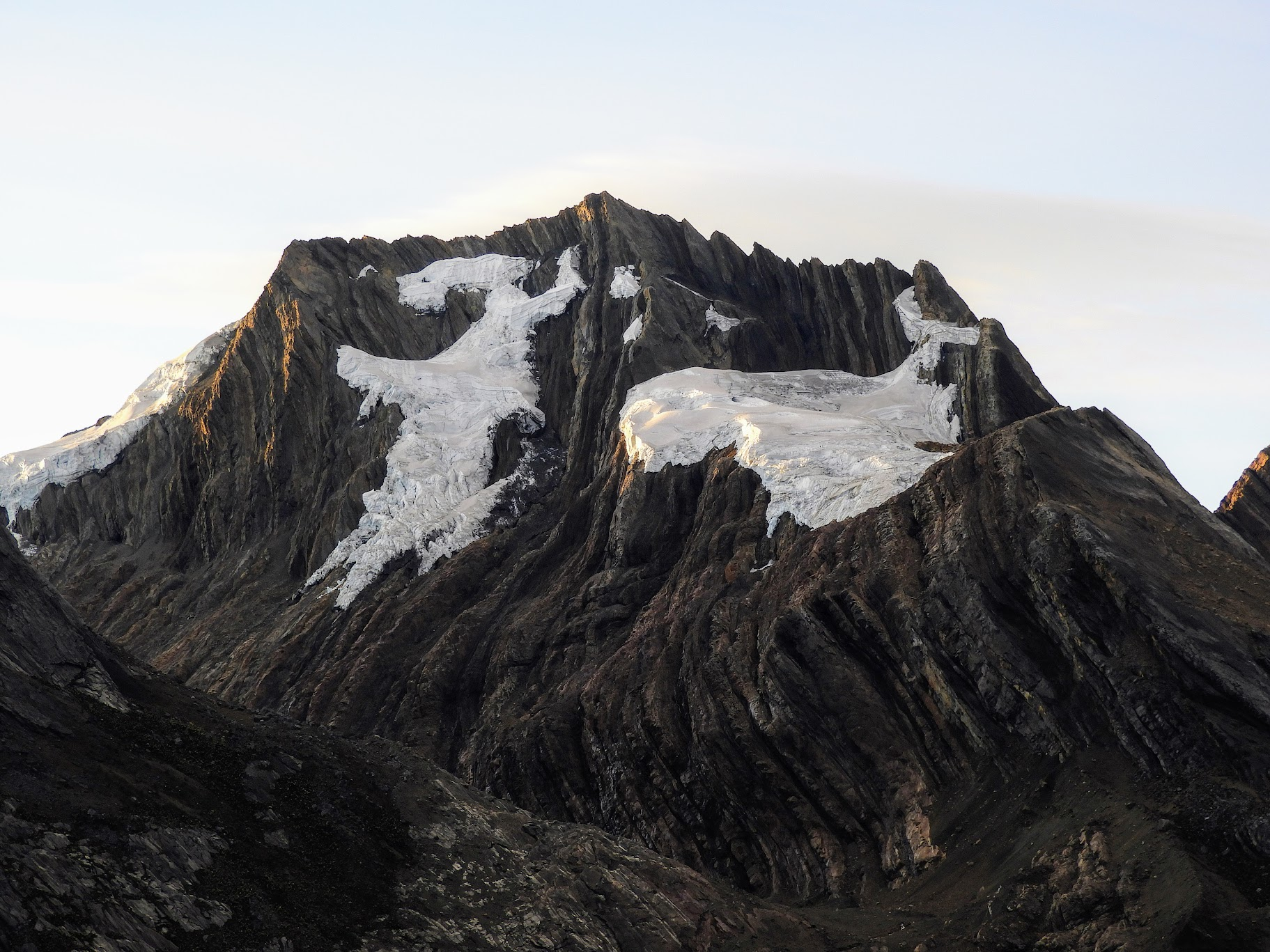
- Northwest aspect

Highest point
- Elevation: 5,170 m (16,962 ft)
- Prominence: 590 m (1,936 ft)
- Parent peak: Ritacuba Blanco
- Isolation: 2.4 km (1.5 mi)
- Coordinates: 6°26′56″N 72°15′29″W

Geography
- Location within Colombia
- Country: Colombia
- Department: Boyacá
- Protected area: El Cocuy National Park
- Parent range: Andes; Cordillera Oriental
- Topo map: CIGM Sheet 137 El Cocuy

El Castillo is a mountain in Boyacá, Colombia.

== Description ==
El Castillo is a 5,170-meter-elevation (16,962-foot) summit in the Cordillera Oriental which is a subrange of the Andes. The mountain is located 17 kilometers (10.5 miles) east of the town of Güicán, and the peak is within El Cocuy National Park. It ranks as the seventh-highest peak in the park and Boyacá Department, as well as the 27th-highest in the country. Precipitation runoff from the mountain's slopes drains into tributaries of the Arauca River which is part of the Orinoco watershed. Topographic relief is significant as the summit rises 800 meters (2,625 feet) in approximately one kilometer (0.6 mile) along the west slope. The nearest higher peak is San Pablin Sur, 2.57 kilometers (1.6 miles) to the west-southwest. The mountain's Spanish toponym translates as "The Castle."

== Climate ==
Based on the Köppen climate classification, El Castillo is located in a tundra climate zone. Here in the tierra fría, air is forced upward by the mountains (orographic lift), causing moisture to drop in the form of rain and snow. This climate supports three small glaciers on the slopes of the peak. The months of September, December, and January offer the most favorable weather for visiting this area.

== Gallery ==
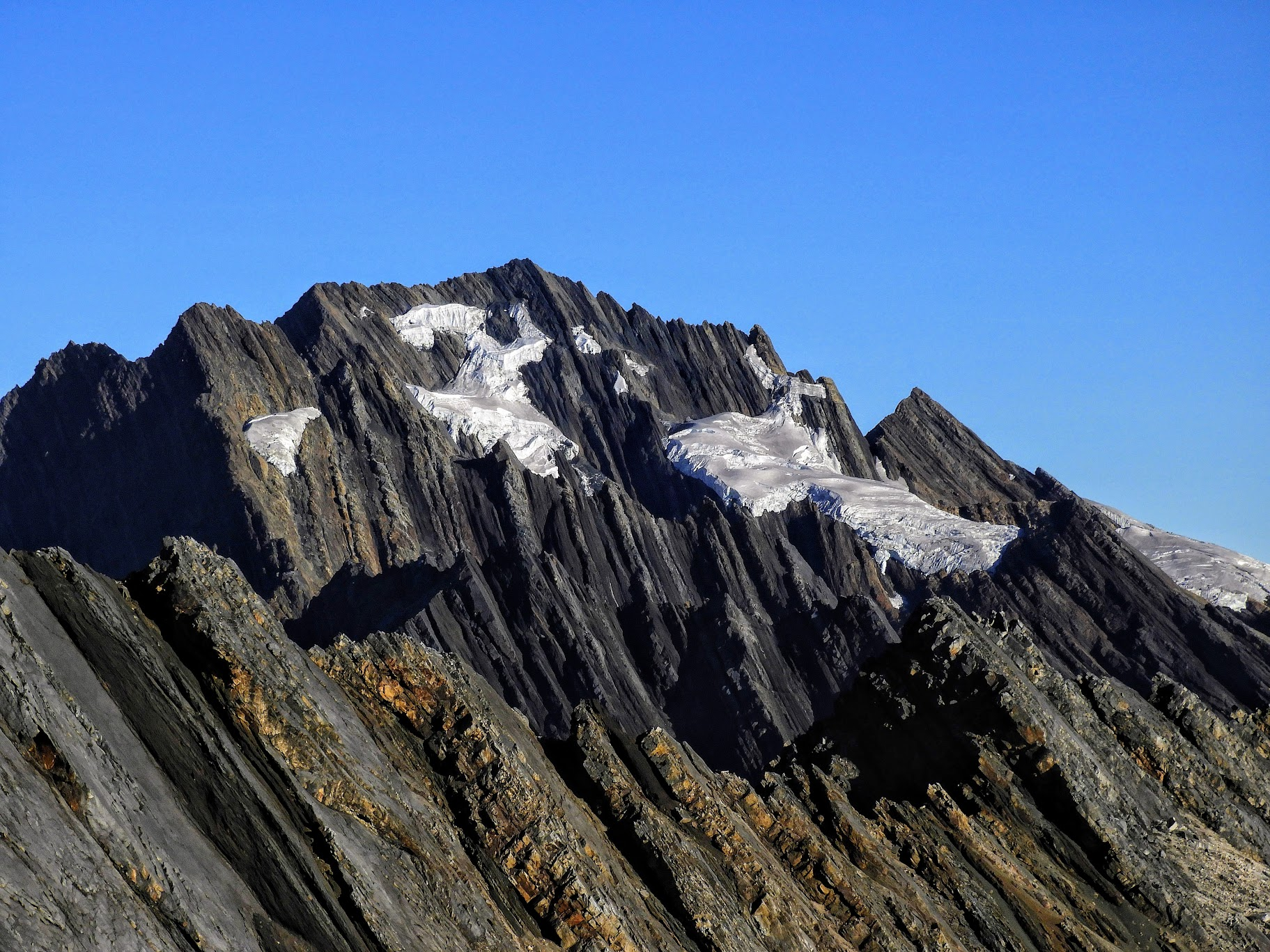
North aspect

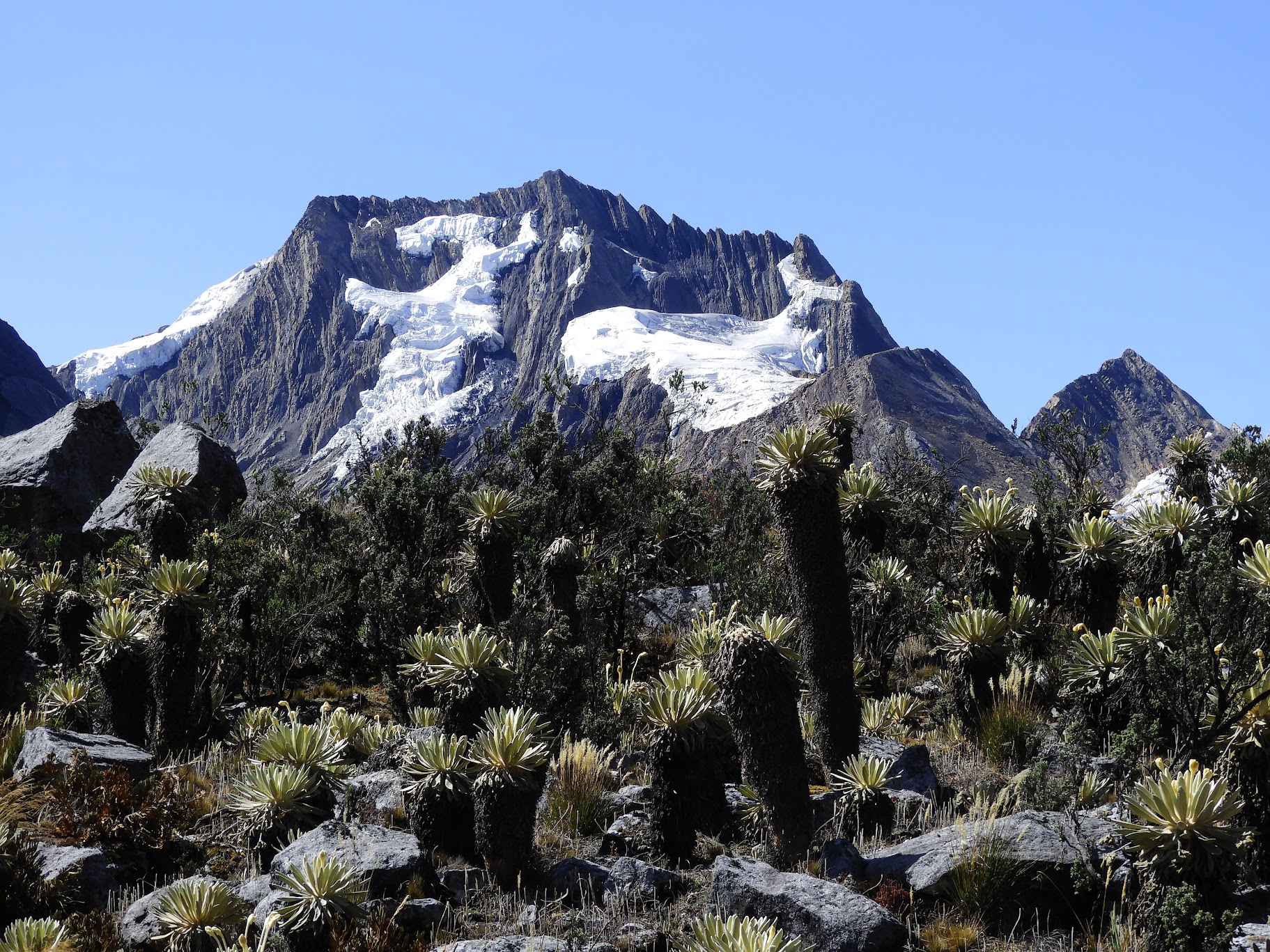
Northwest aspect

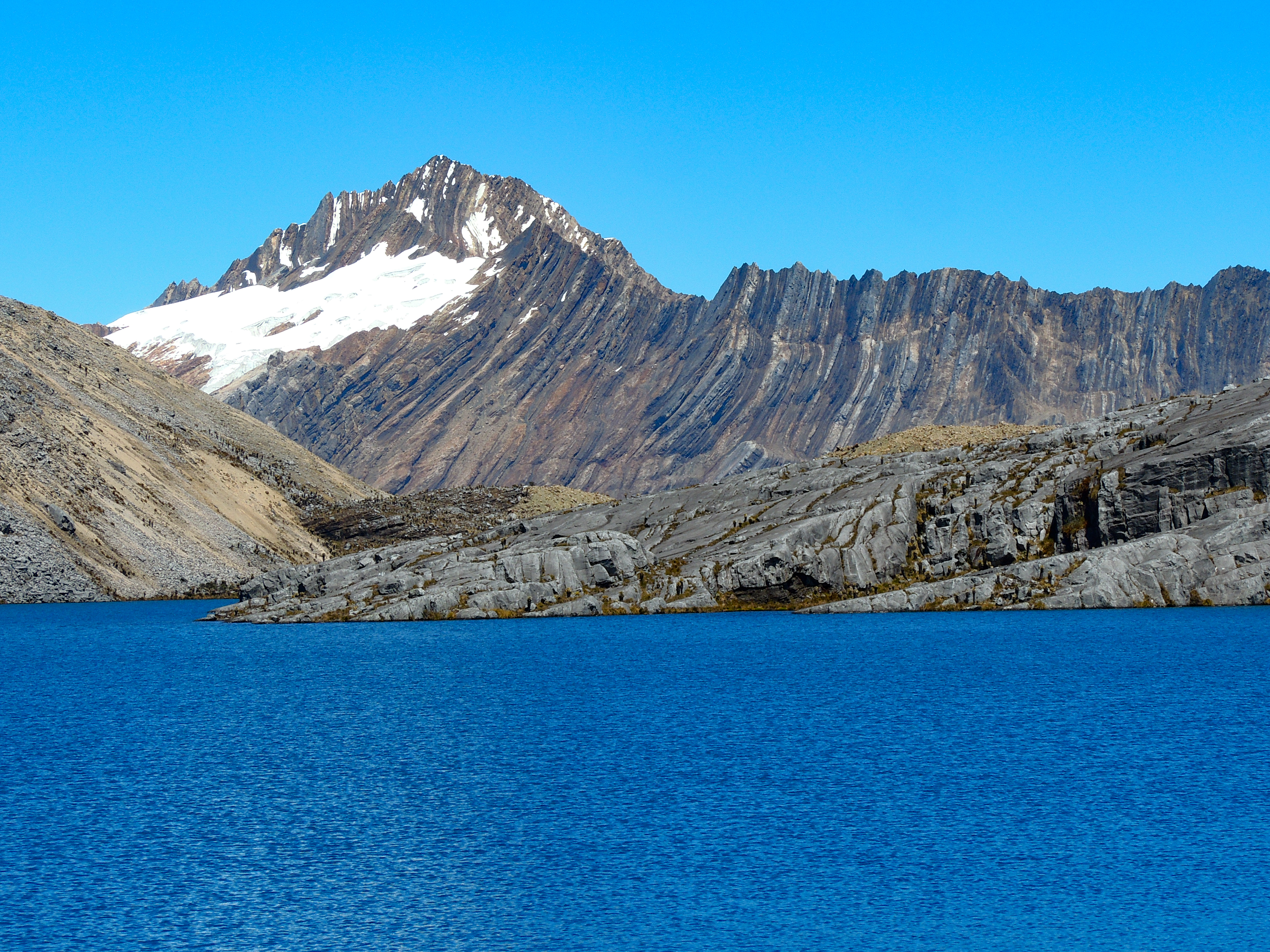
South aspect of El Castillo behind Pico San Antonio. View from Laguna de la Plaza.

== See also ==
- Sierra Nevada del Cocuy
- List of mountains in Colombia
