= Pico Simmonds =

Mountain in Colombia

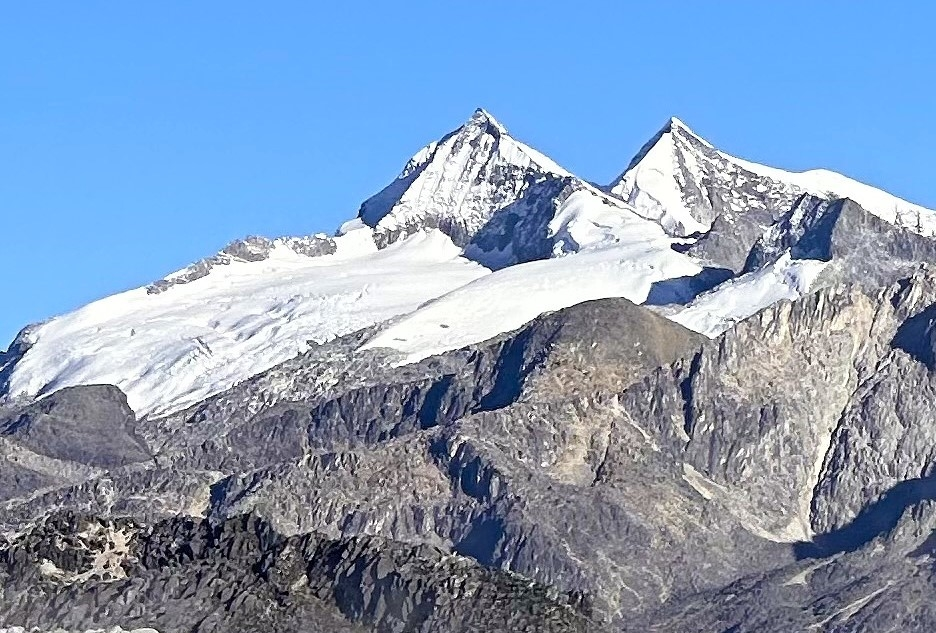
- West aspect, centered (Pico Simón Bolívar to right)

Highest point
- Elevation: 5,596 m (18,360 ft)
- Prominence: 236 m (774 ft)
- Parent peak: Pico Cristóbal Colón
- Isolation: 1.6 km (0.99 mi)
- Coordinates: 10°50′26″N 73°42′20″W

Geography
- Location within Colombia
- Country: Colombia
- Department: Magdalena Department
- Protected area: Sierra Nevada de Santa Marta National Natural Park
- Parent range: Sierra Nevada de Santa Marta

Climbing
- Easiest route: Northwest Ridge

Pico Simmonds is a mountain in northern Colombia.

== Description ==
Pico Simmonds is a 5,596-meter-elevation (18,360-foot) summit in the Sierra Nevada de Santa Marta range. It ranks as the third-highest peak of the range, and the third-highest in the country. The peak is within Sierra Nevada de Santa Marta National Natural Park, Colombia's second oldest national park, established in 1964. Precipitation runoff from the mountain's northwest slope drains to the Tucurinca River, the northeast slope drains to the Palomino River, and the south slope drains to the Aracataca River. Topographic relief is significant as the north slope rises 1,200 meters (3,937 feet) in two kilometers (1.24 miles). The nearest higher peak is Pico Simón Bolívar, 1.6 kilometers (one mile) to the east-southeast. In 1976, Philip de Gruyter and Tom Simpson climbed Pico Simmonds as part of a traverse of the range. On January 23, 2023, Alex Torres and Sergio Garcia Gomez climbed the peak via the North Ridge.

== Climate ==
Based on the Köppen climate classification, Pico Simmonds is located in a tundra climate zone. Here in the tierra fría, air coming off the Caribbean Sea is forced upward by the mountains (orographic lift), causing moisture to drop in the form of rain and snow. This climate supports the Simmonds Glacier on the northwest slope of the peak. The months of December through April offer the most favorable weather for visiting this area.

== See also ==
- List of mountains in Colombia
