= Ritacuba Negro =

Mountain in Colombia

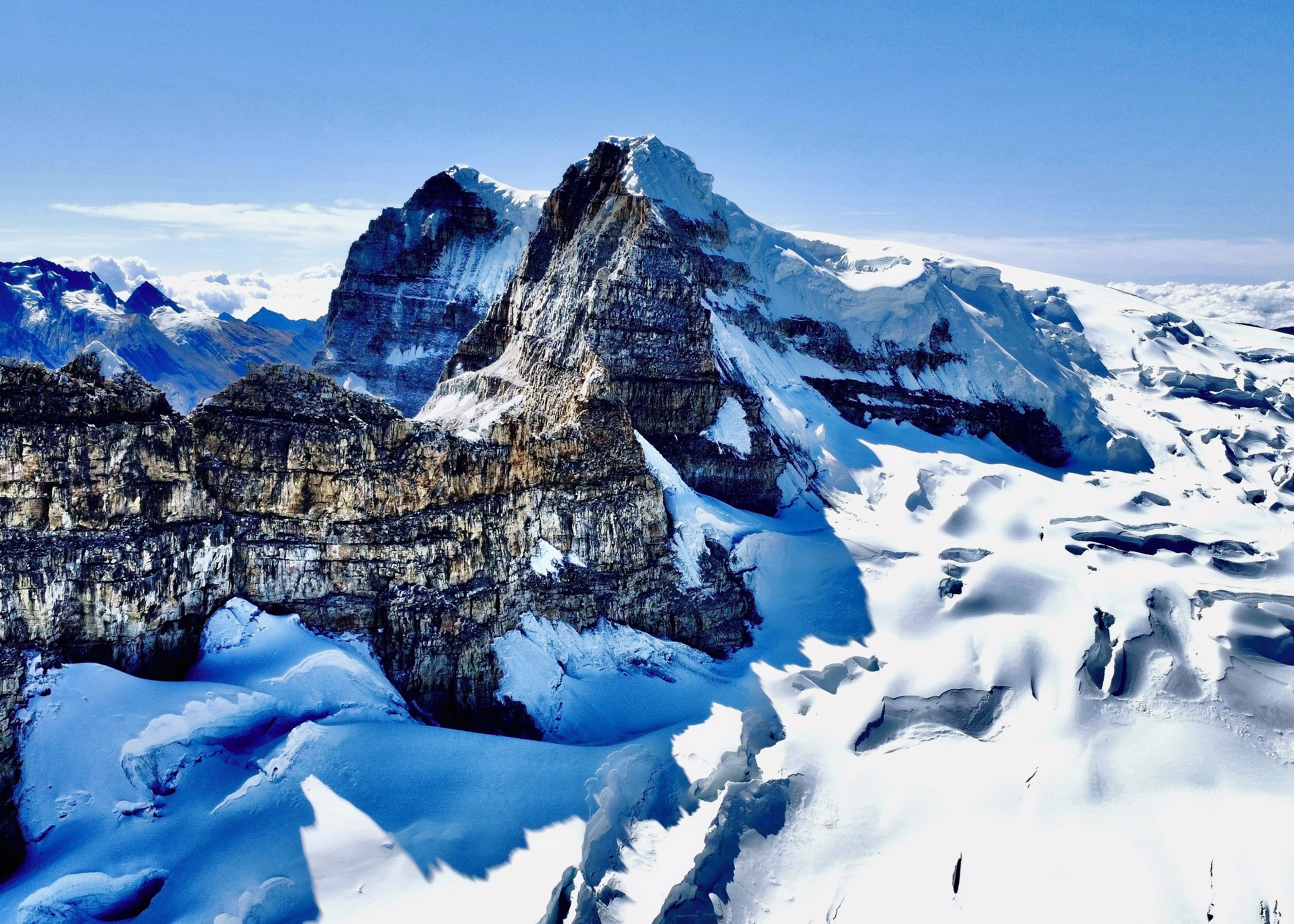
- North aspect, centered (Ritacuba Blanco behind)

Highest point
- Elevation: 5,340 m (17,520 ft)
- Prominence: 212 m (696 ft)
- Parent peak: Ritacuba Blanco
- Isolation: 0.65 km (0.40 mi)
- Coordinates: 6°30′07″N 72°18′12″W

Geography
- Location within Colombia
- Country: Colombia
- Department: Boyacá
- Protected area: El Cocuy National Park
- Parent range: Andes; Cordillera Oriental
- Topo map: CIGM Sheet 137 El Cocuy

Climbing
- Easiest route: Southwest Ridge

Ritacuba Negro is a mountain in Boyacá, Colombia.

== Description ==
Ritacuba Negro is a 5,340-meter-elevation (17,520-foot) summit on the crest of the Cordillera Oriental which is a subrange of the Andes. The peak is within El Cocuy National Park. It ranks as the second-highest peak in the park, the subrange and Boyacá Department, as well as the 10th-highest in the country. Precipitation runoff from the mountain's west slope drains into tributaries of the Chicamocha River, whereas the east slope drains to the Arauca River which is part of the Orinoco watershed. Topographic relief is significant as the summit rises 940 meters (3,084 feet) in two kilometers (1.24 miles) along the east slope. The nearest higher peak is Ritacuba Blanco, 1.12 kilometers (0.69 mile) to the southeast. The first ascent of Ritacuba Negro's summit by Columbians was made on March 26, 1975, by Pepe Luis Moreno and Sergio Gaviria.

== Climate ==
Based on the Köppen climate classification, Ritacuba Negro is located in a tundra climate zone. Here in the tierra fría, air is forced upward by the mountains (orographic lift), causing moisture to drop in the form of rain and snow. This climate supports the Ritacuba Glacier on the west slope of the peak, however this glacier is rapidly melting due to climate change and El Niño. The months of September, December, and January offer the most favorable weather for visiting this area.

== Gallery ==
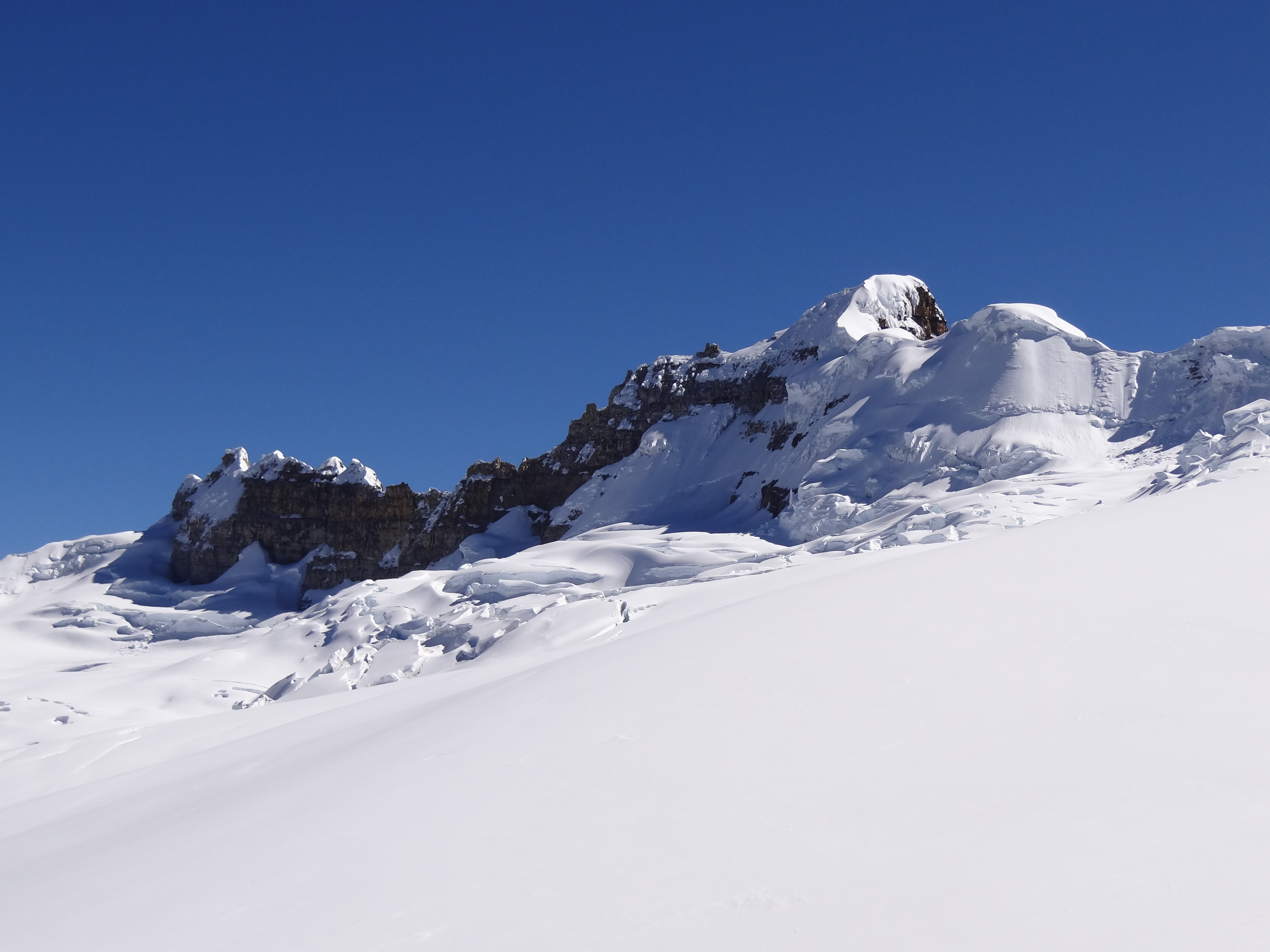
West aspect

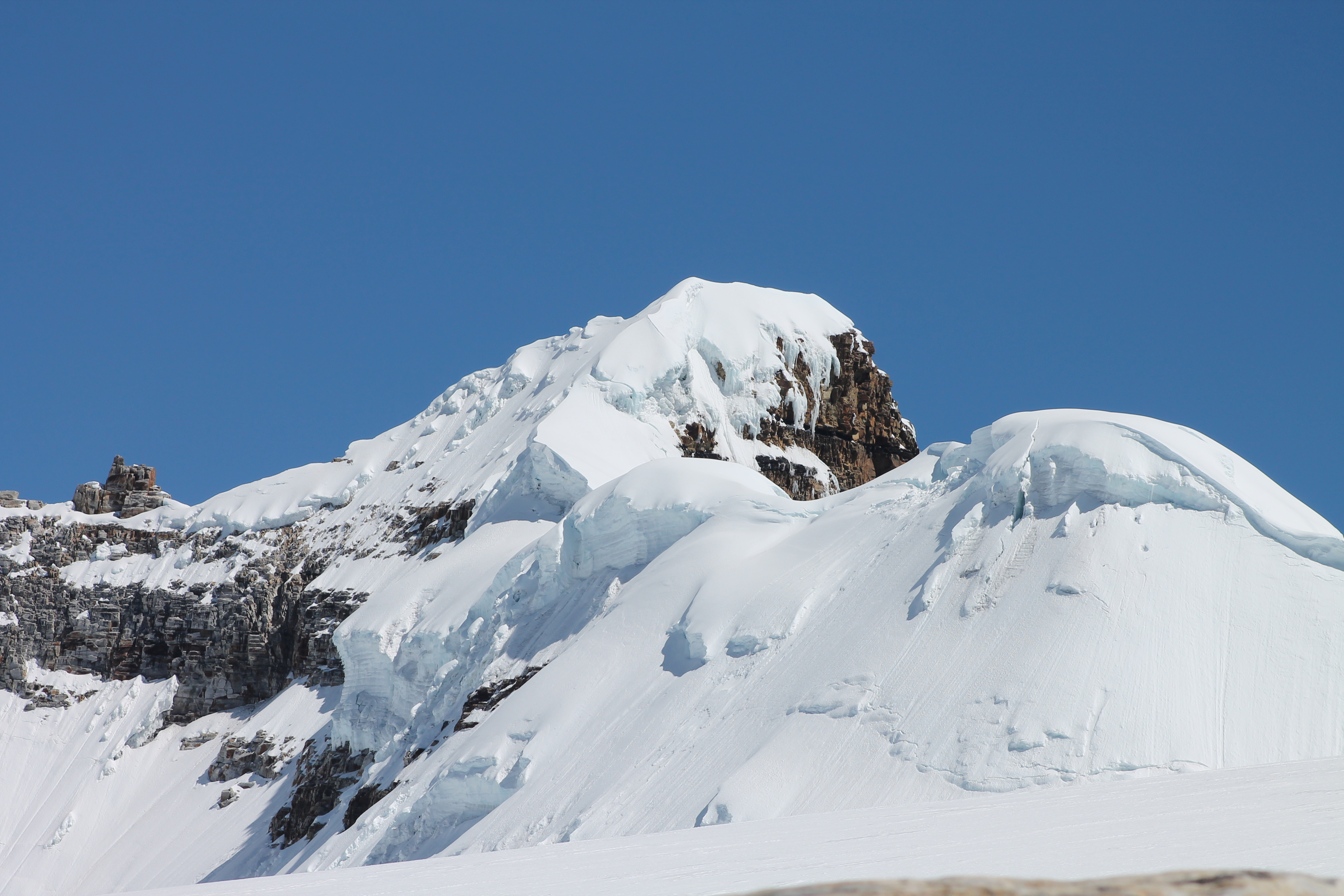
Summit detail

== See also ==
- Sierra Nevada del Cocuy
- List of mountains in Colombia
