= Cumbal Volcano =

Volcano in Nariño, Colombia

Cumbal
- Volcán Cumbal
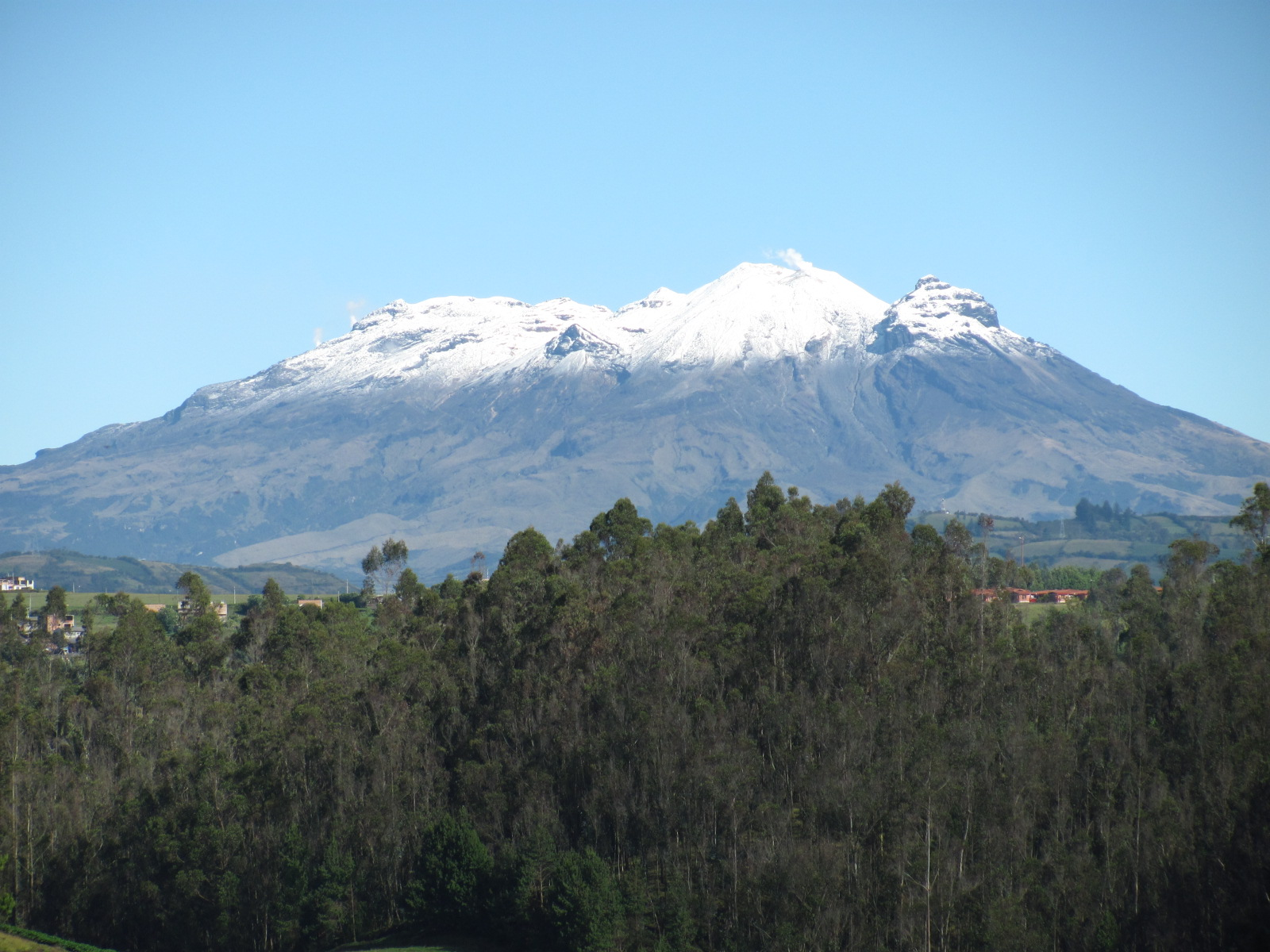
- Cumbal in 2011

Highest point
- Elevation: 4,764 m (15,630 ft)
- Prominence: 1,575 m (5,167 ft)
- Listing: Ultra
- Coordinates: 0°56′56″N 77°53′17″W

Geography
- Location within Colombia
- Location: Colombia
- Parent range: Nudo de los Pastos, Western Ranges; Andes

Geology
- Mountain type: Andesitic stratovolcano
- Last eruption: December 1926

Cumbal is a stratovolcano of the Caribe Terrane, located at the Nudo de los Pastos in Nariño, Colombia. It is the southernmost historically active volcano of Colombia and is together with Chiles and Azufral one of the few volcanoes of the Western Ranges. The volcano is dominated by andesites.

On July 10, 2012, the Colombian Geological Service changed the activity level of the volcano from green to yellow, motivated by changes in the behavior of the volcanic edifice, a situation that still persists.

At its feet is the Cumbal lagoon.

== Plane crash ==
On January 28, 2002 TAME Flight 120 struck one of the sides of the volcano while in a go-around approach to Tulcán. There were no survivors among the 94 occupants.

== Gallery ==
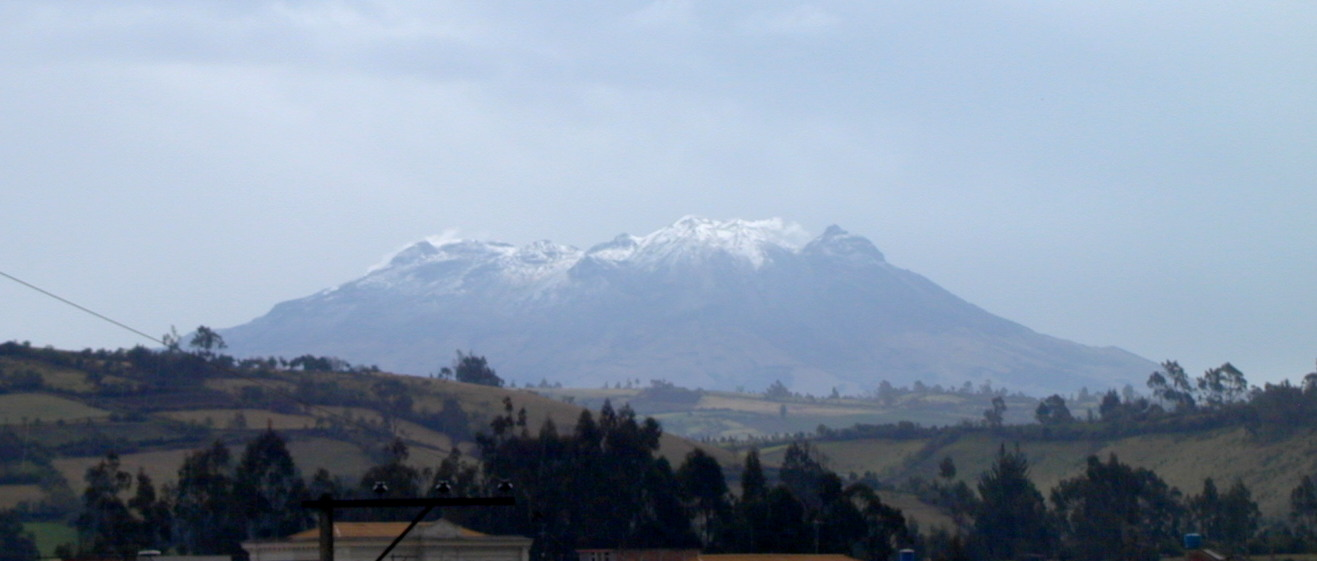
2007

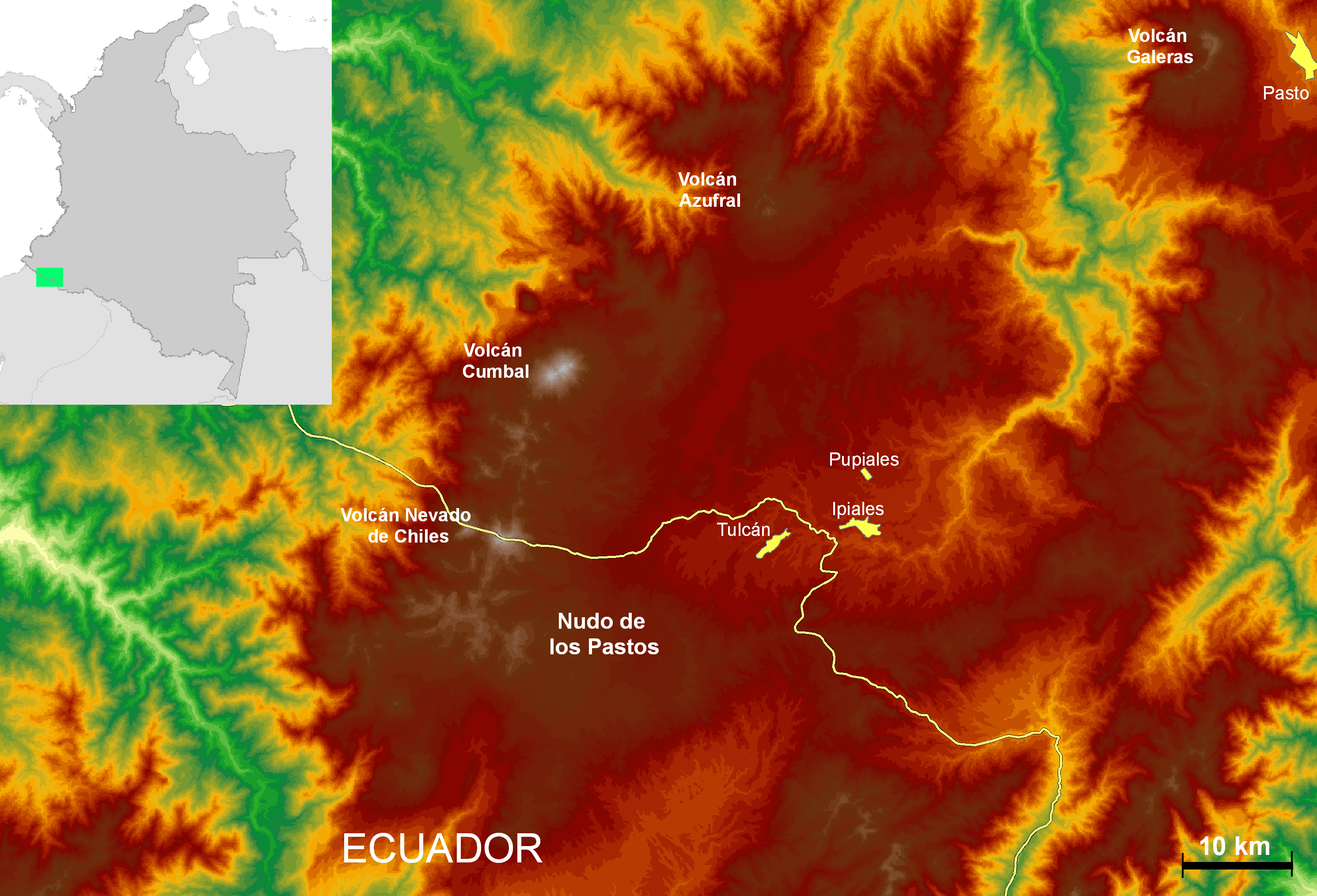
Nudo de los Pastos

== See also ==
- List of volcanoes in Colombia
- List of volcanoes by elevation
- List of mountains in Colombia
