= Doña Juana-Cascabel Volcanic Complex =

Parque Nacional Natural Complejo Volcánico Doña Juana-Cascabel
- Doña Juana-Cascabel Volcanic Complex National Natural Park
- IUCN category II (national park)
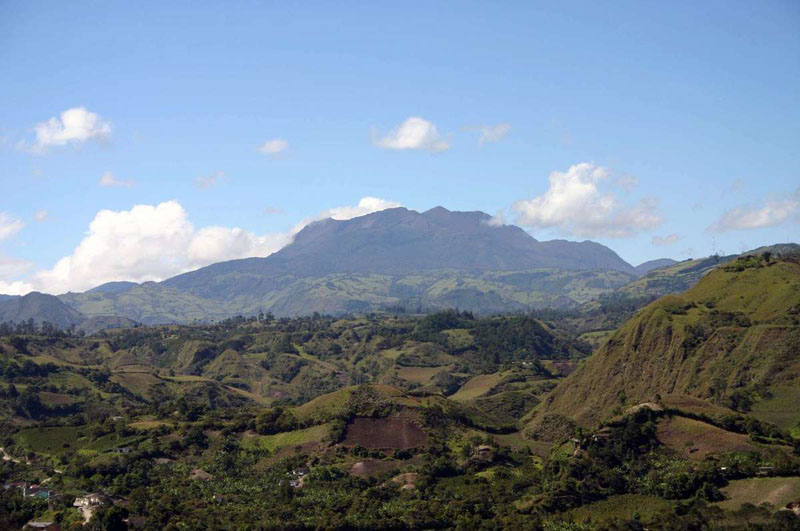
- Panoramic view of the Doña Juana volcanic field
- Interactive map of Parque Nacional Natural Complejo Volcánico Doña Juana-Cascabel
- Location: Nariño and Cauca, Colombia
- Coordinates: 01°28′N 76°49′W
- Area: 65.858 acres (266,520 m^{2})
- Established: March 23, 2007
- Governing body: SINAP

Doña Juana-Cascabel Volcanic Complex National Natural Park (Spanish for Parque Nacional Natural Complejo Volcánico Doña Juana-Cascabel) is a Colombian National Natural Park. The park is located in the Southern Departments of Nariño and Cauca; The park is named after three volcanoes: Doña Juana, Petacas and Las Ánimas. These are in the municipalities of El Tablón, San Bernardo, La Cruz, San Pablo in Nariño Department, and Bolívar, Santa Rosa in the Cauca Department.
