= Pico La Reina =

Mountain in Colombia

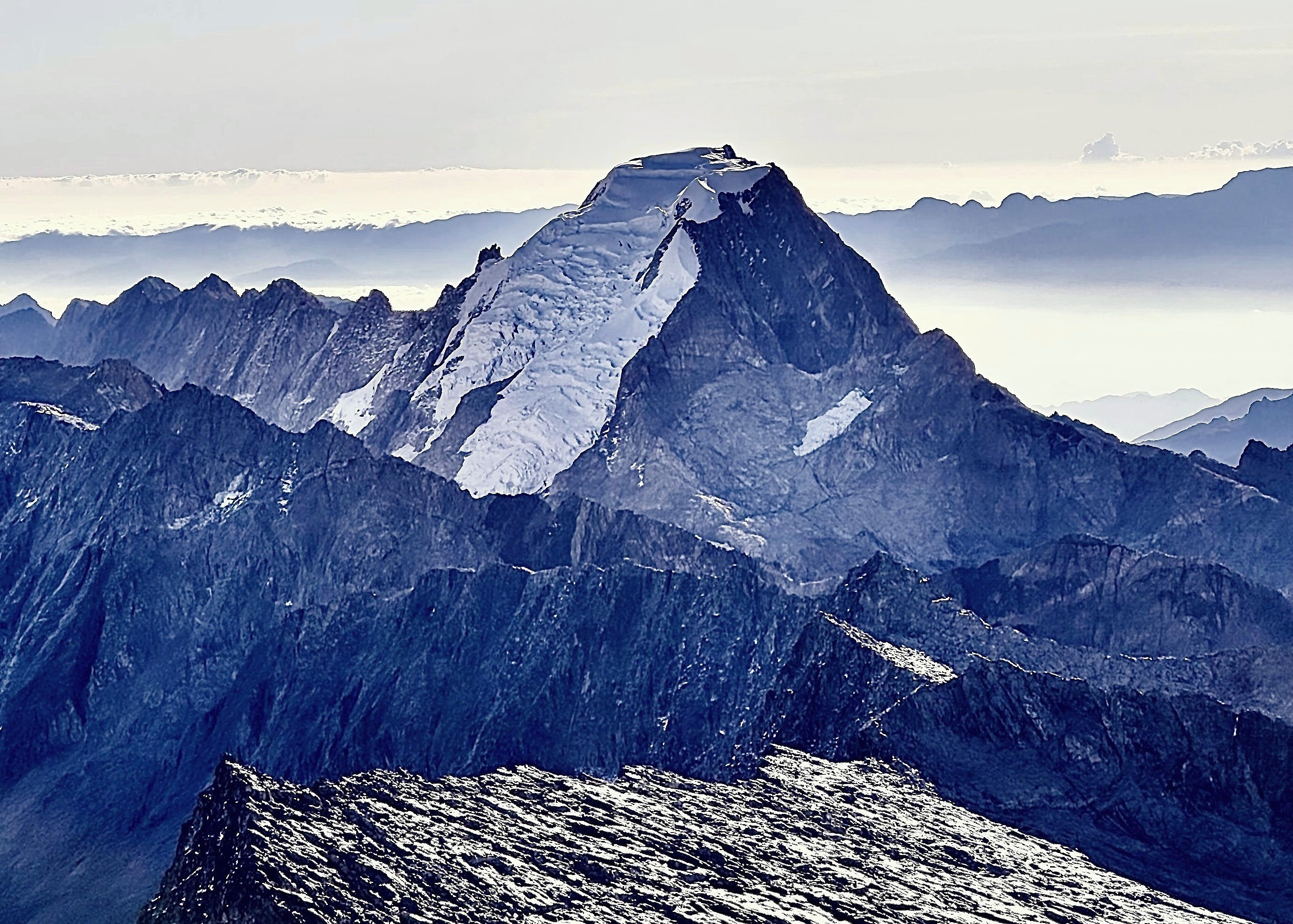
- West aspect

Highest point
- Elevation: 5,510 m (18,077 ft)
- Prominence: 652 m (2,139 ft)
- Parent peak: Pico Cristóbal Colón
- Isolation: 7.99 km (4.96 mi)
- Coordinates: 10°48′51″N 73°36′56″W

Geography
- Location within Colombia
- Country: Colombia
- Department: Cesar Department
- Protected area: Sierra Nevada de Santa Marta National Natural Park
- Parent range: Sierra Nevada de Santa Marta

Climbing
- Easiest route: La Reina Glacier

Pico La Reina is a mountain in northern Colombia.

== Description ==
Pico La Reina is a 5,510-meter-elevation (18,077-foot) summit in the Sierra Nevada de Santa Marta range. It ranks as the highest point of Cesar Department, third-highest of the range, and the fifth-highest in the country. The peak is within Sierra Nevada de Santa Marta National Natural Park, Colombia's second oldest national park, established in 1964. Precipitation runoff from the mountain's slopes drains into tributaries of the Guatapurí River. Topographic relief is significant as the south slope rises 1,510 meters (4,954 feet) in two kilometers (1.24 miles), and the north slope rises 900 meters (2,952 feet) in 1.6 kilometers (one mile). The nearest higher peak is Pico Cristóbal Colón, eight kilometers (five miles) to the west-northwest. Pico La Reina translates from Spanish as "Queen Peak."

== Climate ==
Based on the Köppen climate classification, Pico La Reina is located in a tundra climate zone. Here in the tierra fría, air coming off the Caribbean Sea is forced upward by the mountains (orographic lift), causing moisture to drop in the form of rain and snow. This climate supports the La Reina Glacier on the northwest slope of the peak. The months of December through April offer the most favorable weather for visiting this area.

== See also ==
- List of mountains in Colombia
