= Nevado del Sumapaz =

Nevado del Sumapaz is the highest point in the department of Meta, Colombia. It lies within the Sumapaz National Park. The summit is accessible by road from the city of San Juan del Sumapaz. The official altitude of the summit is given as 4,306 metres (14,127 ft) above sea level. The mountain's snowcap completely disappeared in the early 20th century, owing to climatic and geological conditions.

== Expeditions ==
=== 16th century ===
In the 16th century, the European expeditions of Federmann (1539), López Montalvo de Lugo (1540) Hernán Pérez de Quesada (1540) and Gonzalo Jimenez de Quesada (1570) passed through the region of Nevado del Sumapaz. There was also a commercial trade route that connected Santa Fe and San Martín, but in the end, this route was abandoned because of its wild and rugged nature.

=== 20th century ===
Erwin Kraus made his first excursion to Nevado del Sumapaz in 1939. He had heard of the existence of a glacier at the summit, but upon arrival discovered that it had disappeared, and was only remembered by the oldest of the local residents, who affirmed that it had disappeared in the earthquake of 31 August 1917 whose epicenter was located in the village of Nazareth in Sumapaz.

== See also ==
- List of mountains in Colombia
