= Cerro Bravo =

Volcano in Colombia

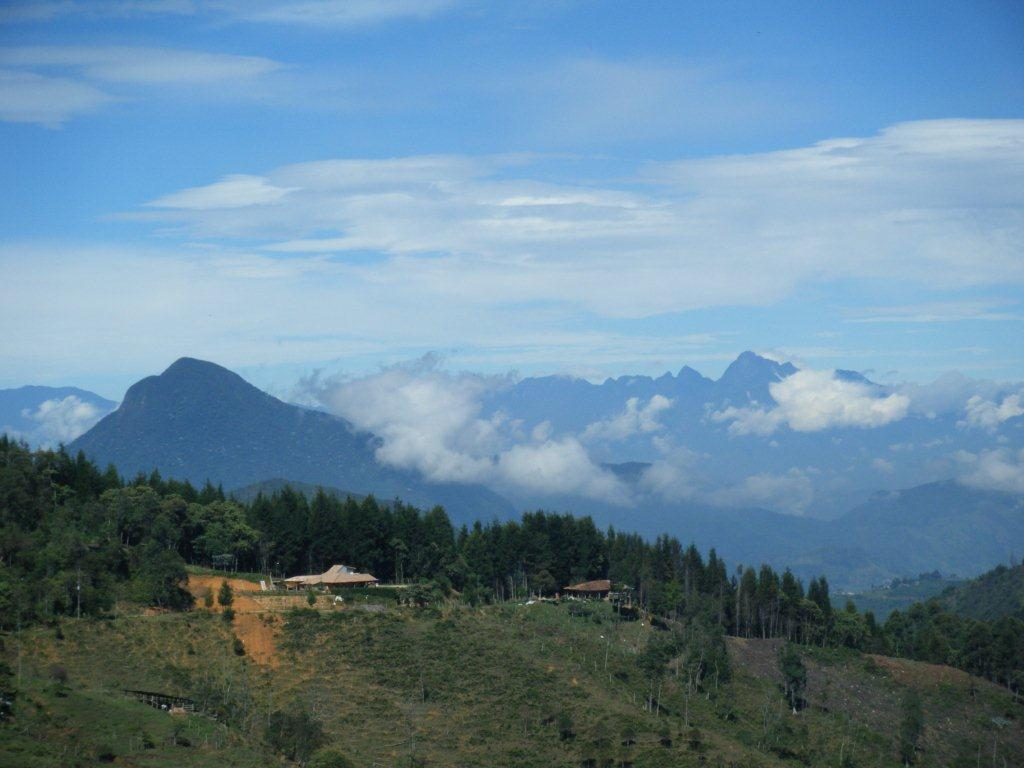
- Cerro Bravo in June 2010

Highest point
- Elevation: 4000+ metres (13,123+ ft)
- Listing: Volcanoes of Colombia
- Coordinates: 5°05′31″N 75°18′00″W

Geography
- Location within Colombia
- Location: Tolima; Colombia
- Parent range: Central Ranges; Andes

Geology
- Rock age: Holocene
- Mountain type: Andesitic stratovolcano
- Last eruption: 1720 ± 150 years

Cerro Bravo is a stratovolcano located in Tolima, Colombia, north of the Nevado del Ruiz volcano. The rock type of the volcano is andesite.

== Eruptive history ==
As with many volcanoes in the region, Bravo's eruptions are often characterized by a central vent (caldera) eruption, followed by an explosive eruption and pyroclastic flows. However, it is unique in the fact that its eruptions have also produced lava domes in its caldera. Such eruptions occurred in 1720 ± 150 years, 1050 ± 75 years, and 750 AD ± 150 years (through radiocarbon dating). Eruptions consisting of just a central vent eruption and subsequent explosive eruption took place in 1330 ± 75 years, 1310 BC ± 150 years, 1050 BC ± 200 years and 4280 BC ± 150 years.

== Gallery ==
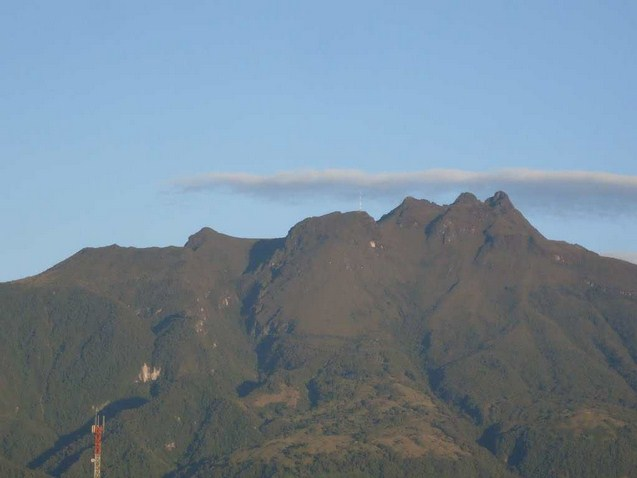
2009

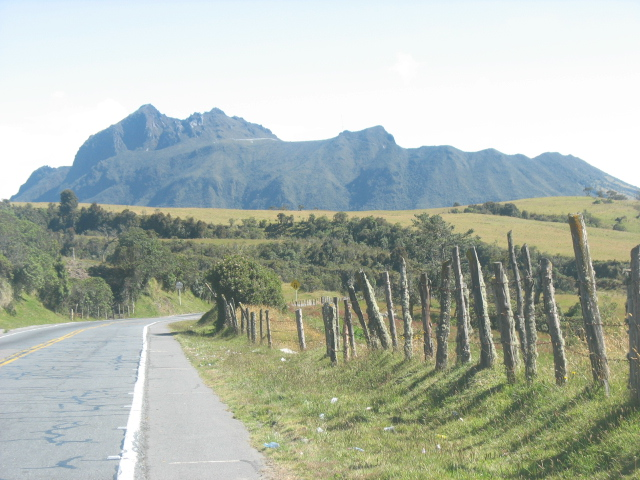
2009

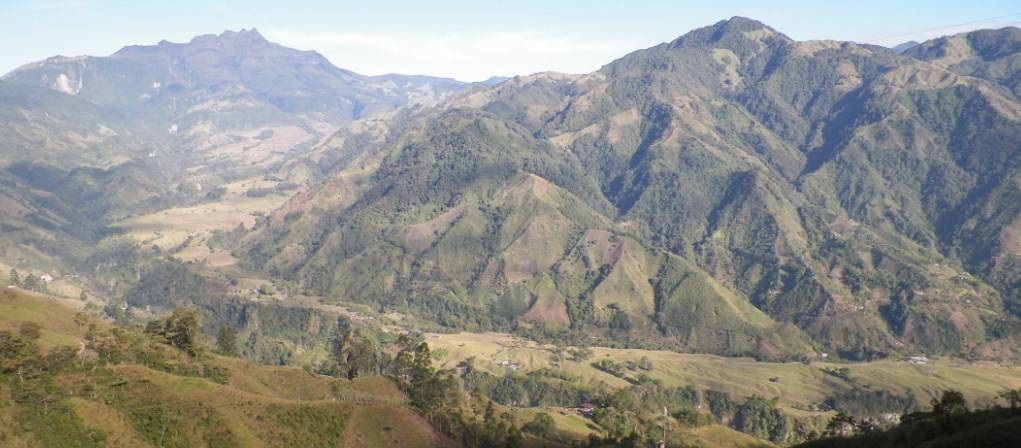
2014

== See also ==
- List of volcanoes in Colombia
- List of volcanoes by elevation
- List of mountains in Colombia
