= Sotará (volcano) =

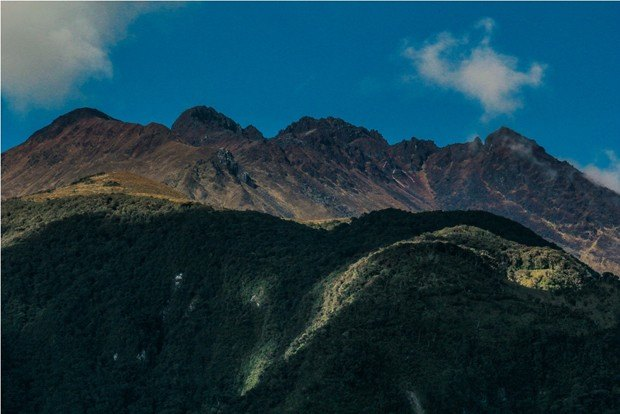
- Sotará in 2016

Highest point
- Elevation: 4,580 m (15,030 ft)
- Listing: Volcanoes of Colombia
- Coordinates: 2°06′29″N 76°35′31″W

Geography
- Location within Colombia
- Location: Sotará, Cauca; Colombia
- Parent range: Central Ranges, Andes

Geology
- Mountain type: Extinct basaltic-andesitic stratovolcano
- Volcanic belt: North Volcanic Zone; Andean Volcanic Belt
- Last eruption: unknown

Sotará is a stratovolcano located in Sotará, Cauca, Colombia. The volcano has hot springs of 80 °C (176 °F) and fumarole activity with a composition of 80% CO_{2} and 20% H_{2}S. The volcano is located between the Silvia-Pijao Fault in the west and the San Jerónimo Fault in the east.

== Gallery ==
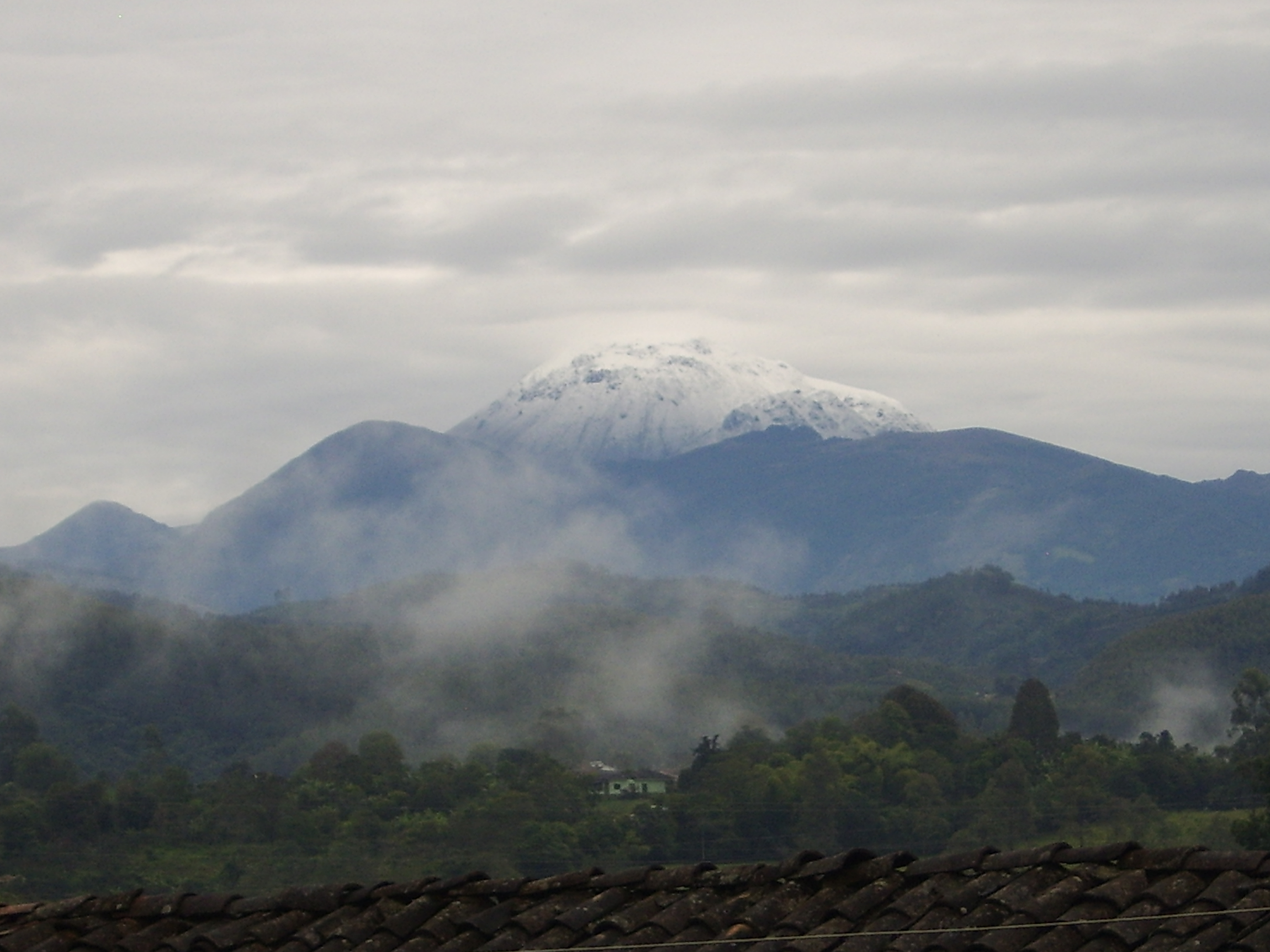
Sotará in 2010

== See also ==
- Geology of Colombia
- List of volcanoes in Colombia
- List of volcanoes by elevation
- List of mountains in Colombia
