= Las Ánimas (volcano) =

- Volcán Las Ánimas
- Location within Colombia

Highest point
- Elevation: 4,175 m (13,698 ft)
- Listing: Volcanoes of Colombia
- Coordinates: 1°33′50.4″N 76°51′15.7″W

Geography
- Location: Cauca & Nariño; Colombia
- Parent range: Central Ranges, Andes

Geology
- Rock age: Plio-Pleistocene
- Volcanic belt: North Volcanic Zone; Andean Volcanic Belt
- Last eruption: Prehistoric

Las Ánimas is a volcano of the Central Ranges of the Colombian Andes at the border of the departments of Cauca and Nariño. The volcano is 4,175 metres (13,698 ft) high.

As is the neighbouring Petacas, the volcano is part of the Doña Juana Volcanic Complex, and lies northeast of the main Doña Juana volcano and southeast of Petacas. The products of the volcanic activity of the volcano have been found in San Pablo, Nariño. The activity of the volcano has been noted as prehistoric.

The volcanoes are located between the El Tablón Fault to the west and the San Jerónimo Fault to the east.

== See also ==
- List of volcanoes in Colombia
- List of volcanoes by elevation
- List of mountains in Colombia
