= Doña Juana =

Active volcano in Colombia

- Volcán Doña Juana
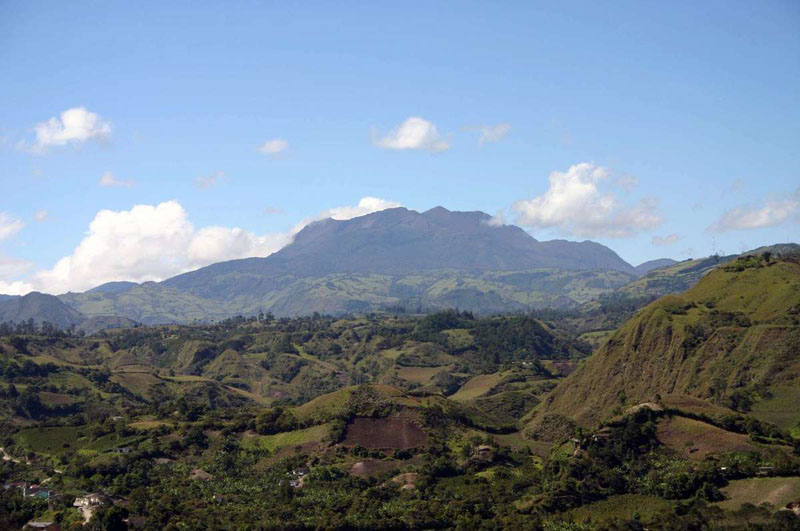
- Panoramic view of the Doña Juana volcanic field

Highest point
- Elevation: 4,137 m (13,573 ft)
- Prominence: 815 m (2,674 ft)
- Listing: Ultra
- Coordinates: 1°30′00″N 76°56′10″W

Geography
- Location within Colombia
- Location: Nariño, Colombia
- Parent range: Central Ranges; Andes

Geology
- Mountain type: Stratovolcano
- Volcanic belt: Andean Volcanic Belt
- Last eruption: 1897 to November 1, 1906

Major volcanoes in Colombia

Doña Juana (Spanish: Volcán Doña Juana) is a stratovolcano, located within the Doña Juana-Cascabel Volcanic Complex National Natural Park (Spanish: Parque Nacional Natural Complejo Volcánico Doña Juana-Cascabel) in Nariño, Colombia.

With a previous eruption of VEI 4, Doña Juana is rated as a "large" volcano of "cataclysmic" destructive power. During its last eruption, in 1906, more than 100 people were killed and many houses were destroyed.

Its largest known historical eruption was on November 13, 1899. In its prehistory, it is known to have erupted in the 23rd century BC in a caldera-forming eruption of unknown magnitude.

== Etymology ==
The name of the volcano originated from a legend of the Chincha Indians, within whose native lands it is located: Mama Juana, a beautiful Quiteña, fell in love with Pedro, a commoner, but with the parents opposed to the marriage, they fled, becoming the victims of a curse that turned them into volcanoes.

== Biodiversity ==
The volcano can be ascended from a slope that is part of the so-called Valley of Orchids. It is surrounded by an area of extraordinary biodiversity, which includes 471 species of birds (the Andean condor included), bears, deer and pumas.

The summit of Dona Juana consists of a number of peaks, which afford a number of views, including of Laguna del Silencio, one of 42 lakes in the national park. Las Animas and Petacas volcanoes are located to the northeast of Doña Juana. All three volcanoes are located between the El Tablón Fault in the west and the San Jerónimo Fault in the east.

== Gallery ==
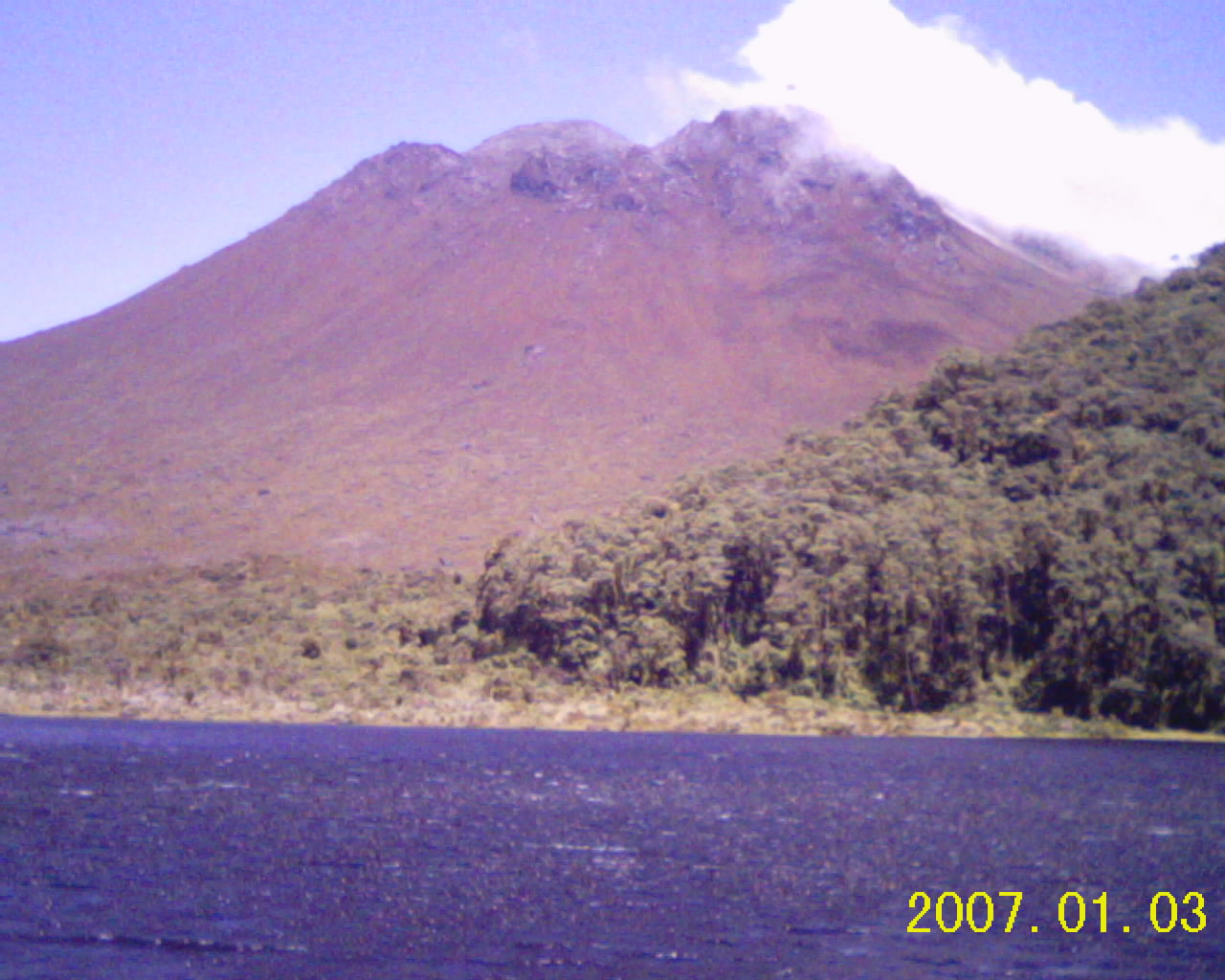
2007

== See also ==
- List of volcanoes in Colombia
- List of volcanoes by elevation
- List of mountains in Colombia
