= Alto de Nique =

Mountain in Colombia and Panama

- Map of Colombia-Panama border

Highest point
- Elevation: 1,730 m (5,680 ft)
- Prominence: 1,557 m (5,108 ft)
- Listing: Ultra
- Coordinates: 7°42′06″N 77°43′38″W

Geography
- Location within Panama Location within Colombia
- Location: Colombia – Panama border

Alto de Nique is a mountain in South and Central America. It is 1,730 metres (5,676 ft) tall and sits on the international border between Colombia and Panama.

== See also ==
- List of mountains in Colombia
