= Azufral =

Volcano in Colombia

- Volcán Azufral
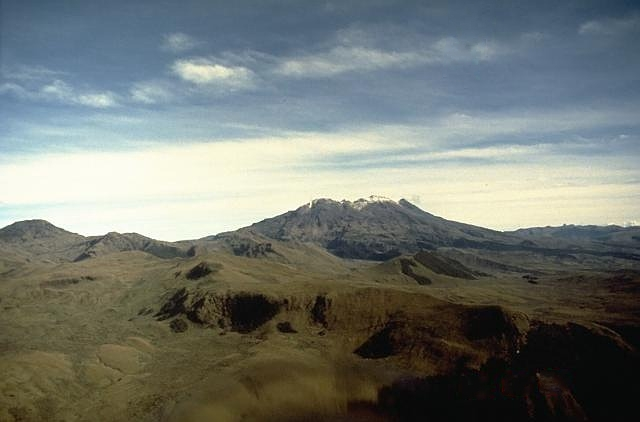
- Azufral in 1989

Highest point
- Elevation: 4,070 m (13,350 ft)
- Listing: Volcanoes of Colombia
- Coordinates: 1°05′N 77°41′W

Geography
- Location within Colombia
- Location: Nariño, Colombia
- Parent range: Western Ranges; Andes

Geology
- Rock age: Holocene
- Mountain type: Stratovolcano
- Volcanic zone: Northern Volcanic Zone
- Volcanic belt: Andean Volcanic Belt
- Last eruption: 930 BC(?)

Azufral is a stratovolcano located in the department of Nariño in southern Colombia, 12 km (7 mi) west of the town of Túquerres. It is the only volcano of the Western Ranges of the Colombian Andes. Its name derives from the Spanish word for sulfur, azufre. The volcano is considered semi-dormant but there are numerous fumaroles in the summit crater. The summit of the volcano has an altitude of 4,070 metres (13,350 ft), and the north-western side of the crater contains a crescent-shaped lake named Laguna Verde (English: Green Lake) at 3,970 m (13,025 ft). The lake is 1,100 m (0.68 mi) long and 600 metres (2,000 ft) wide. and its bright green color is a result of the sulfur and iron-based deposits in the crater. There are also two other much smaller lakes in the crater, Laguna Negra (English: Black Lake) and Laguna Cristal (English: Crystal Lake).

The volcano lies within a nature reserve, the Reserva Natural del Azufral, created in 1990. The reserve covers an area of 5,800 hectares (58 km^{2}) and is free of charge to enter. As Azufral is semi-dormant, there are no restrictions on ascending the volcano and visiting Laguna Verde: there is a road that climbs to within 1.5 kilometers (1 mi) from the summit, and the remaining distance can be covered on foot via a trail.

== Gallery ==
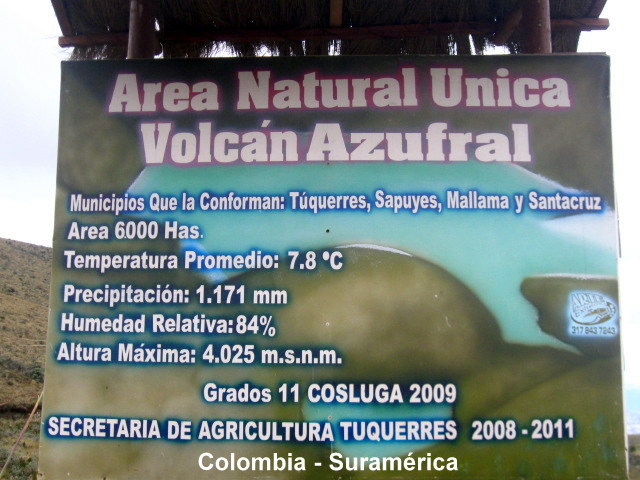
Entrance

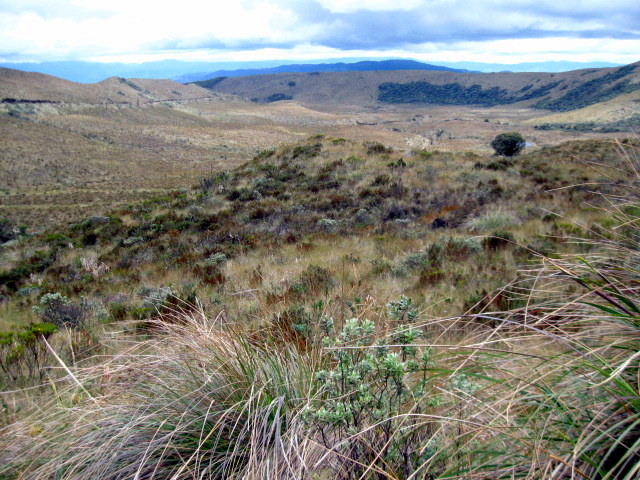
Landscape

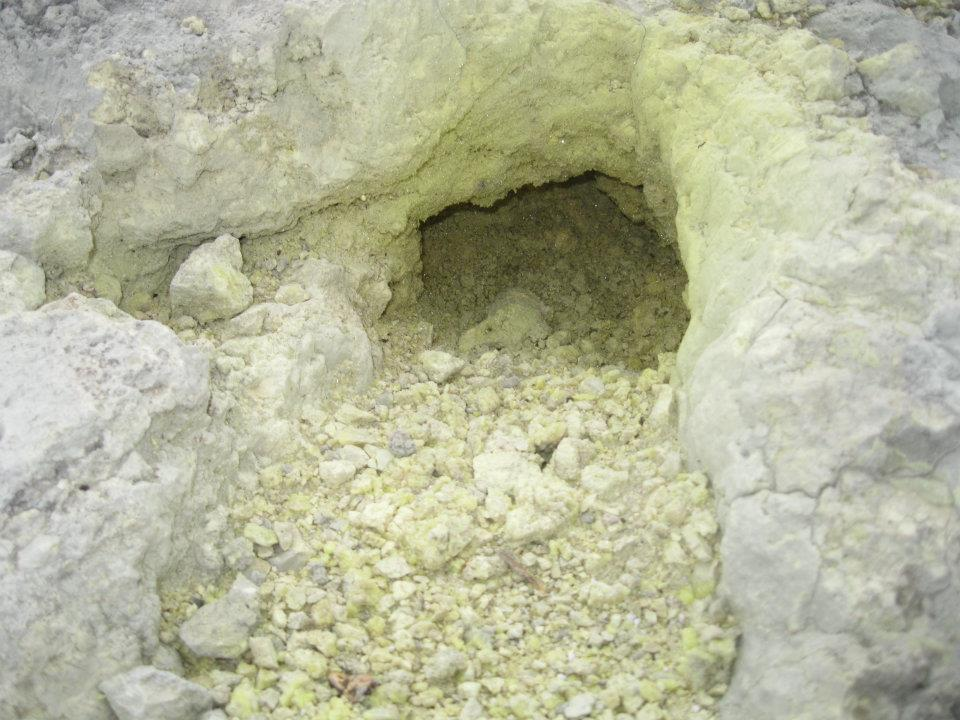
Sulfur
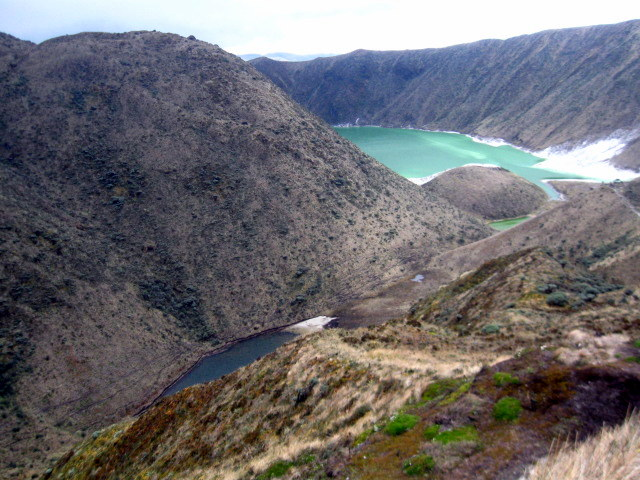
Lagunas Negra and Verde

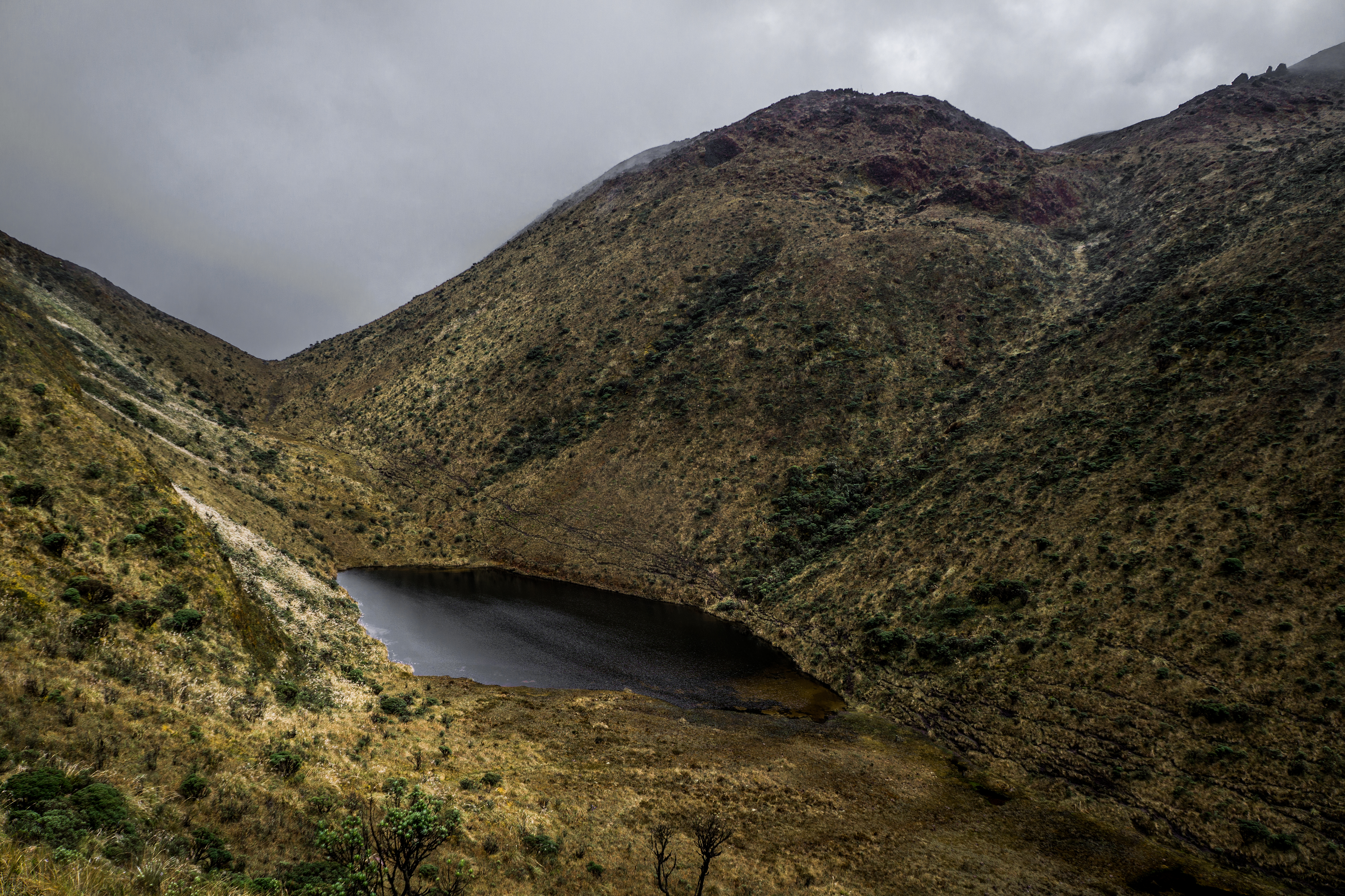
Laguna Negra

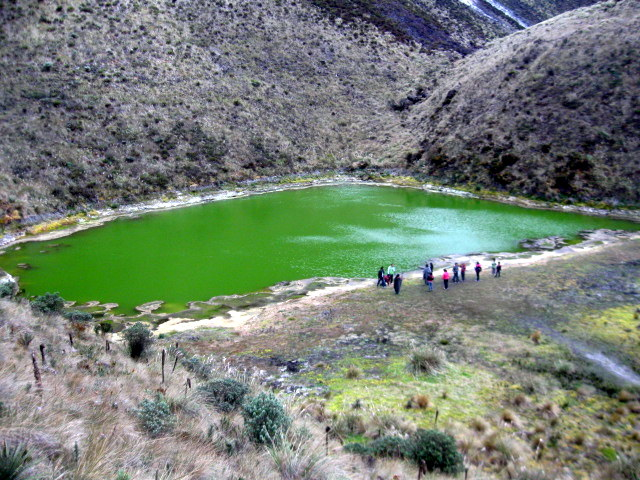
Laguna Verde

== See also ==
- List of volcanoes in Colombia
- List of volcanoes by elevation
- List of mountains in Colombia
