= List of volcanoes in Colombia =

Major volcanoes in Colombia

This is a list of active and extinct volcanoes in Colombia.

Name	Elevation		Coordinates	Last eruption
Name	meters	feet	Coordinates	Last eruption
Azufral	4070	13,353	1.08°N 77.68°W	930 BC ?
Cerro Bravo	4000	13,123	5.092°N 75.30°W	1720 ± 150 years
Cerro Machín	2749	9,019	4.48°N 75.40°W	1180
Cerro Negro de Mayasquer	4445	14,583	0.98°N 77.88°W	1936
Chiles	4756	15,616	0°47′52″N 77°57′3″W	1936
Cumbal	4764	15,630	0.82°N 77.96°W	1926
Doña Juana	4137	13,573	1.47°N 76.92°W	1906
Galeras	4276	14,029	1°13′0″N 77°22′0″W	2014
Nevado del Huila	5365	17,601	2.92°N 76.05°W	2012
Nevado del Tolima	5276	17,310	4.67°N 75.33°W	1943
Nevado del Ruiz	5321	17,457	4°53′N 75°22′W	2012
Petacas	4054	13,300	1.57°N 76.78°W	5950 BC ± 500 years
Puracé	4646	15,243	2.32°N 76.40°W	2026 (Ongoing)
Romeral	3858	12,657	5.206°N 75.364°W	5950 BC ± 500 years
Santa Isabel	4950	16,240	4.82°N 75.37°W	2800 BC ± 100 years
Sotará	4580	15,030	2.12°N 76.58°W	?

== See also ==
- List of earthquakes in Colombia
- List of fossiliferous stratigraphic units in Colombia
- Geology of Colombia
