= Petacas =

- Cerro de las Petacas
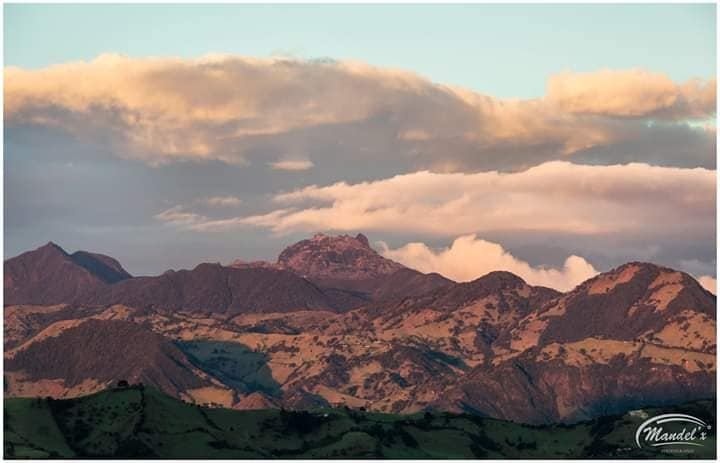

Highest point
- Elevation: 4,018 m (13,182 ft)
- Prominence: 478 m (1,568 ft)
- Listing: Volcanoes of Colombia
- Coordinates: 1.6211°N 76.8425°W

Geography
- Location within Colombia
- Location: Cauca & Nariño; Colombia
- Parent range: Central Ranges, Andes

Geology
- Mountain type: Lava dome
- Volcanic belt: North Volcanic Zone; Andean Volcanic Belt
- Last eruption: unknown

Petacas is a lava dome in the departments of Cauca and Nariño, Colombia.

Doña Juana and Las Animas volcanoes lie nearby. These volcanoes are all located between the El Tablón Fault to the west and the San Jerónimo Fault to the east.

== See also ==
- List of volcanoes in Colombia
- List of volcanoes by elevation
- List of mountains in Colombia
