= Chingaza =

Chingaza may refer to:

- Chingaza Natural National Park, a national park, commonly called "Chingaza", east of Bogotá, Colombia
- Chingaza Dam, a dam in the park
- Ischnura chingaza, a species of dragonfly described from Chingaza National Park
- Araneus chingaza, a species of spider, idem
- Polylobus chingaza, a species of beetle, idem
