= Serranía del Pinche =

Mountain range

- Location within Colombia

Highest point
- Peak: Cerro Napi
- Elevation: 3,860 m (12,660 ft)
- Coordinates: 2°30′28″N 77°18′08″W

Geography
- Country: Colombia
- Region: Cauca

The Serranía del Pinche are part of the Western Ranges of the Colombian Andes. The mountains consist of several high peaks with small patches of isolated páramo and provide a corridor between the Pacific and Andean biogeographic regions. It is located municipality of Argelia in the Department of Cauca. This area is under consideration for protection as a Flora and Fauna Sanctuary by the Colombian government. This area is important for its incredible biodiversity and high percentage of primary forest. An endemic hummingbird - the gorgeted puffleg (Eriocnemis isabellae) - is only found here and the population is considered to be critically endangered.

== Geography ==
The range is located in southwestern Colombia on the western flank of the West Andes in south central Cauca Department, on the border with Nariño Department. It includes the villages of El Naranjal, Las Pilas, La Belleza, Lusitania and Santa Clara within the municipality of Argelia. The altitudinal range varies between 2,200 m (7,200 ft) and 3,800 m (12,500 ft). The western border consists of the upper basins of the Timbiquí and Guapi Rivers. To the north are the Plateado and Napi Rivers and to the south and east is the upper basin of the San Juan de Micay River, one of the most economically important rivers of this region.

This part of the Western Ranges is located south and west of Munchique, a national natural park of equal importance with regards to its high biodiversity.
