= Pico Simón Bolívar =

Mountain in Colombia

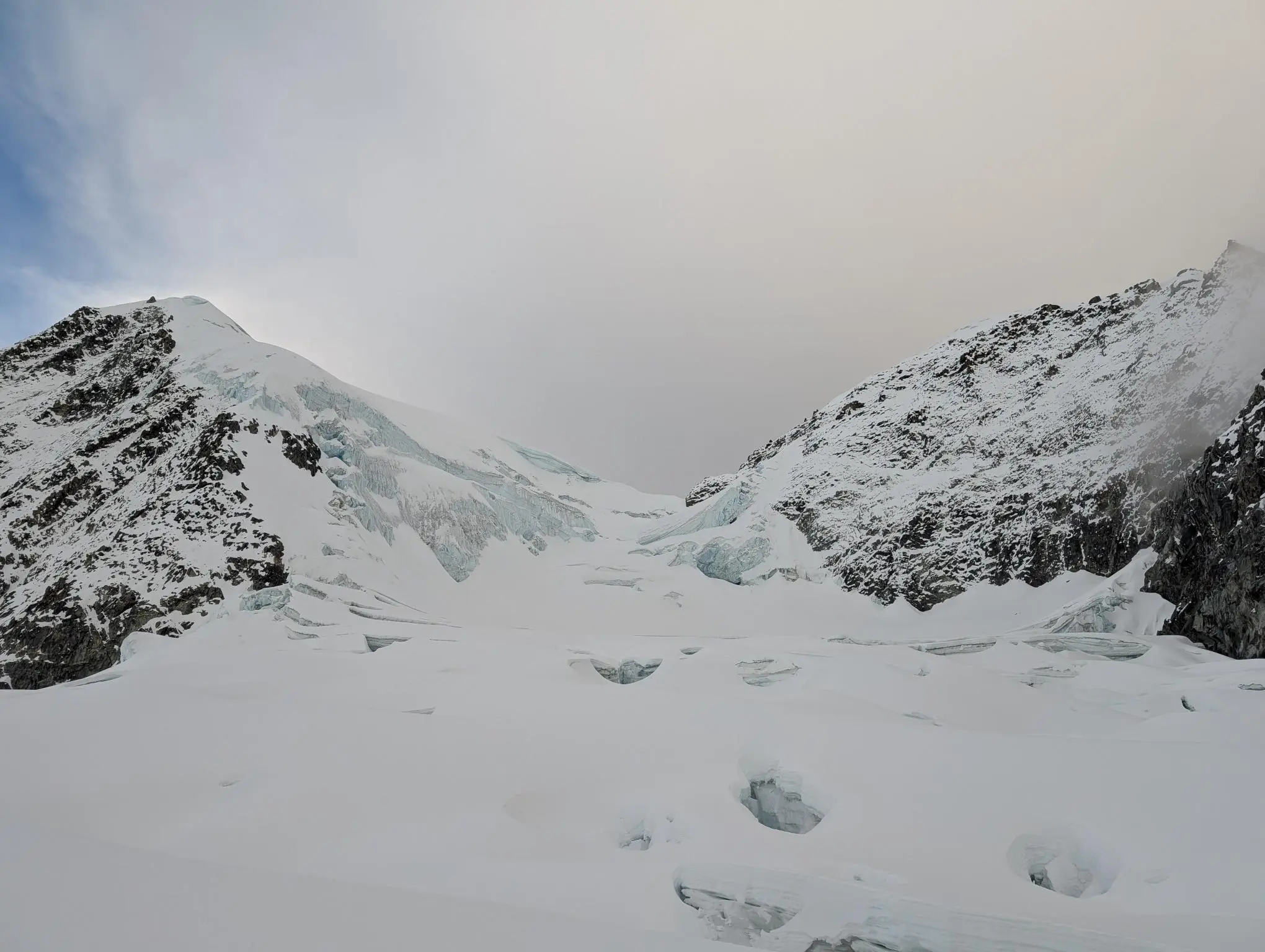
- Pico Cristóbal Colón (left) and Pico Simón Bolívar (right) in 2024

Highest point
- Elevation: 5,720 m (18,770 ft)
- Prominence: 5,529 m (18,140 ft); Ranked 5th
- Listing: Country high point Ultra
- Coordinates: 10°50′05″N 73°41′26″W

Geography
- Location within Colombia
- Location: Magdalena Department, Colombia
- Parent range: Sierra Nevada de Santa Marta

Climbing
- First ascent: 1939 by Wood, Bakerwell and Praolini
- Easiest route: moderate snow/ice climb, Alpine AD

Pico Simón Bolívar is possibly the highest mountain in Colombia, with an estimated height of 5,720 metres (18,770 ft). Pico Bolívar and the neighbouring summit of Pico Cristóbal Colón are the two highest peaks in Colombia and are very nearly equal in elevation. The height difference is about 7 meters. For this reason, it is the fifth most prominent peak in the world (see list of peaks by prominence). The nearest peak that is higher is Cayambe, some 1,288 kilometres (800 mi) away. There is a permanent snowcap on this peak and on the nearby mountains. It is part of the Sierra Nevada de Santa Marta range, along with Pico Cristóbal Colón. The peak is named after Simón Bolívar.

== Climbing history ==
Pico Simón Bolívar was first climbed in 1939 by W. Wood, A. Bakewell and E. Praolini.

Access to these mountains became very difficult after the early 1990s due to hostile locals, drug traffickers, and FARC guerillas. An expedition in 2015 was one of the first to climb in the range for many years, reaching the summit of Pico Cristóbal Colón.

== See also ==
- List of mountains by elevation
- List of Ultras of South America
- List of mountains in Colombia
