= Farallones del Citará =

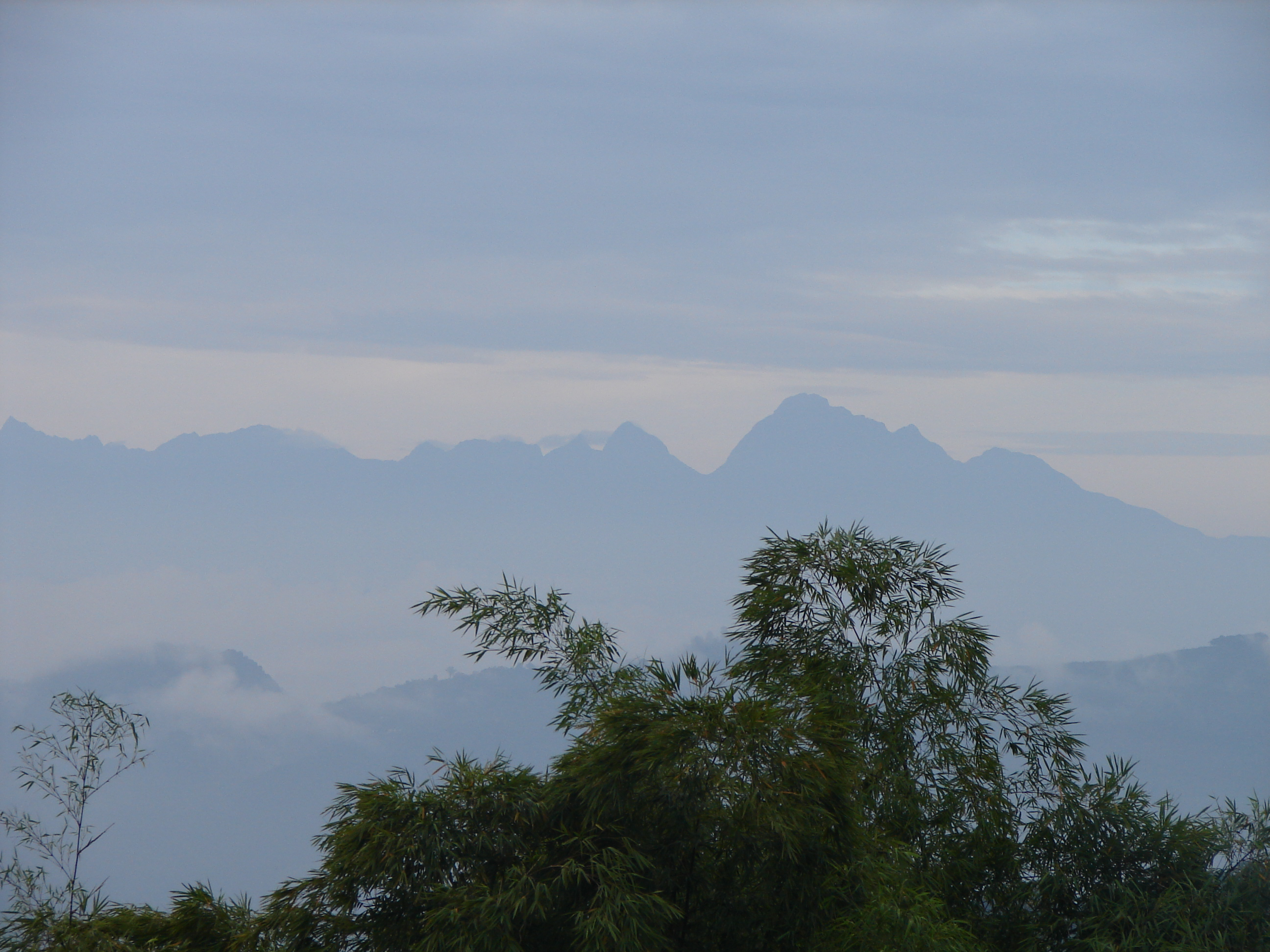
- Farallones del Citará as seen from the municipality of Santa Bárbara, Antioquia.

Highest point
- Elevation: 13,320 ft (4,060 m)
- Coordinates: 05°45′33″N 76°03′41″W

Geography
- Location: Antioquia, Colombia

The Farallones del Citará are situated in the mountains of southwest Antioquia, Colombia, only miles from the border with neighboring Chocó. The area contains two rivers, the Citará river and the Atrato river.

The chain of mountains in the Farallones de Citará are part of a protected forest reserve that comprises more than 75,000 acres of land, including approximately 45,000 virgin forests, 30,000 of which are in a government designated buffer zone to protect from human deforestation. Nonetheless there are also human settlements as well as eco-friendly tourism services in the area.

The elevation of the mountains varies, to a maximum of 13,320 feet above sea level with higher portions of the mountains falling below the freezing point on some nights and receiving snowfall. Lower elevations having a pleasant climate. The region has many native bird species, most notably the chestnut-bellied flowerpiercer and Andean cock-of-the-rock.

The Farallones del Citará are found approximately 10 miles southwest of Ciudad Bolívar, Antioquia, and approximately 48 miles southwest of Medellin, Antioquia. Most excursions into the southwestern mountains begin there.
