= Ritacuba Blanco =

Peak in the Andes Mountains of Colombia

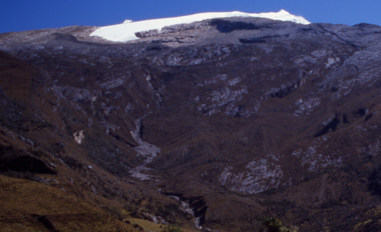
- Ritacuba Blanco from the west

Highest point
- Elevation: 5,410 m (17,750 ft)
- Prominence: 3,645 m (11,959 ft); Ranked 46th
- Listing: Ultra
- Coordinates: 06°29′39″N 72°17′51″W

Geography
- Location within Colombia
- Location: Sierra Nevada del Cocuy, Colombia
- Parent range: Cordillera Oriental, Colombia; Andes
- Topo map: CIGM Sheet 137

Climbing
- Easiest route: glacial hike

Ritacuba Blanco is the highest peak of Cordillera Oriental, in the Andes Mountains of Colombia. It's also named Ritak'uwa, an ancient name from the U'wa indigenous people that live in the lowlands of the National Park Sierra Nevada del Cocuy y Güicán, where the Ritacuba Blanco is located. The summit is accessible from the west via the town of El Cocuy, the village of Güicán, and the hamlet of Las Cabañas. The hike is fairly easy, but the weather is not reliable, and a glacier must be crossed. Because of global warming, its glacier is melting at very high rates, backing down 25 linear mts per year; the same is happening at amazing speeds to all other snow-covered tropical mountains in Colombia. In 1950, Ritacuba Blanco's glacier extended down to 4,100 metres (13,500 ft) above sea level; in January 2007 its lowest point was at 4,500 metres (14,800 ft) above sea level. If this melting rate continues, the glacier is expected to disappear before 2055.

== Directions to access the mountain ==
You can access Ritacuba Blanco either from the Cocuy or Güicán in the Boyacá department. After departing from either town you have to travel to Kanwara to start the main hike to the base of the mountain.

== Climbing Routes ==
North West: This is the normal route which is technically easy. Basic mountaineering knowledge is needed to climb up the mountain.

The east side offers challenging routes for big wall rock climbing, although access to this route is limited.

== See also ==
- List of peaks by prominence
- List of Ultras of South America
- List of mountains in Colombia
