= Pico Cristóbal Colón =

Mountain in Colombia

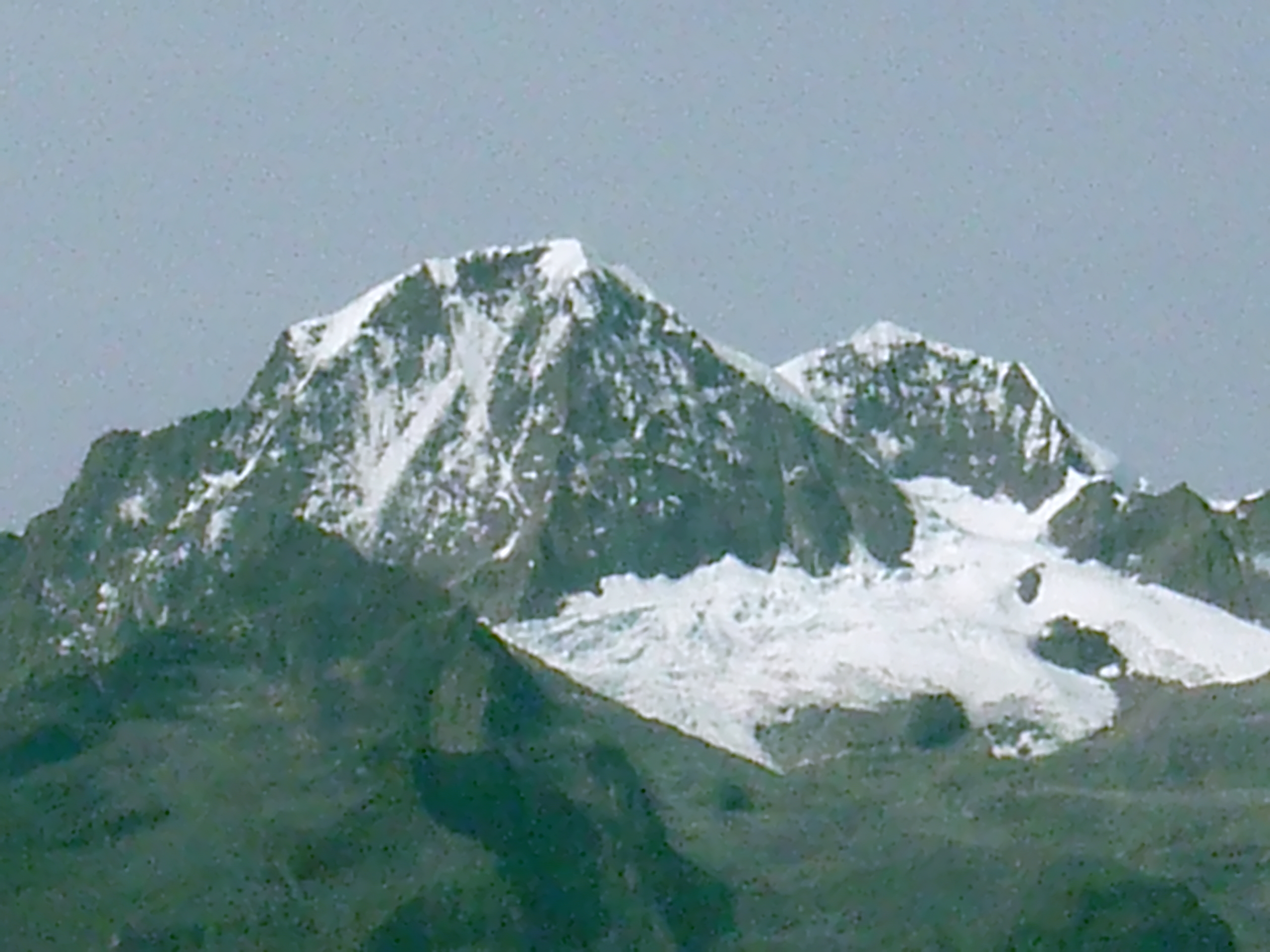
- Pico Cristóbal Colón in 2008

Highest point
- Elevation: 5,775 m (18,947 ft)
- Prominence: 5,509 m (18,074 ft); Ranked 5th
- Listing: Country high point Ultra
- Coordinates: 10°50′18″N 73°41′12″W

Naming
- Native name: Gonawindua (Cogui)

Geography
- Location within Colombia
- Location: Magdalena Department, Colombia
- Parent range: Sierra Nevada de Santa Marta

Climbing
- First ascent: 1939 by Wood, Bakerwell and Praolini
- Easiest route: basic snow/ice climb, Alpine PD

Pico Cristóbal Colón (pre-Columbian name: Gonawindua) is possibly the highest mountain in Colombia, with a reported height of 5,775 metres (18,947 ft). Pico Cristóbal Colón and Pico Simón Bolívar are the two highest peaks in Colombia and almost equal in elevation. One of the two mountains is therefore the fifth most prominent in the world (see list of peaks by prominence). The nearest peak that is higher is Cayambe, some 1,288 kilometres (800 mi) away. There is a permanent snowcap on this peak and on the nearby mountains. It is part of the Sierra Nevada de Santa Marta range, along with Pico Simón Bolívar, and was named after Christopher Columbus. This mountain is the highest point in South America outside the Andes.

== Climbing history ==
Colón was first climbed in 1939 by Walter Wood, Anderson Bakewell and E. Praolini.

Access to these mountains became very difficult after the early 1990s due to hostile locals, drug traffickers and FARC guerillas. An expedition in 2015 led by John Biggar was one of the first to climb in the range for many years, and reached the summit of Pico Colón on 13 December.

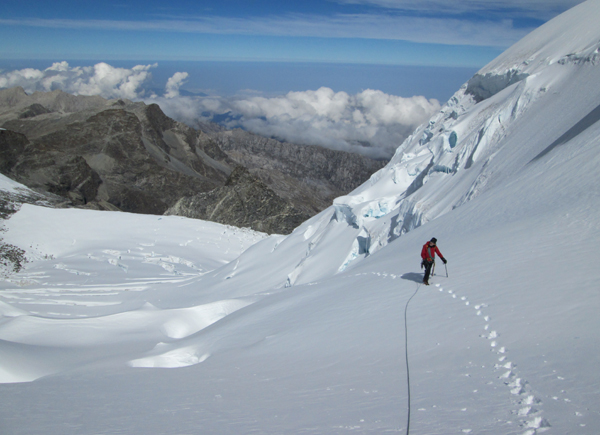
Petter Bjorstad climbing the north glacier on Pico Colon, December 2015

== Cultural Significance ==
The indigenous Kogi honor Pico Colón as a holy mountain which they call "Gonawindua". They believe that this mountain is "The Heart of the World" and they are the "Elder Brothers" who care for it.

== See also ==
- List of mountains by elevation
- List of Ultras of South America
- List of mountains in Colombia
