= Cordillera Oriental (Colombia) =

Widest of the three branches of the Colombian Andes

Cordillera Oriental (Eastern Ranges)
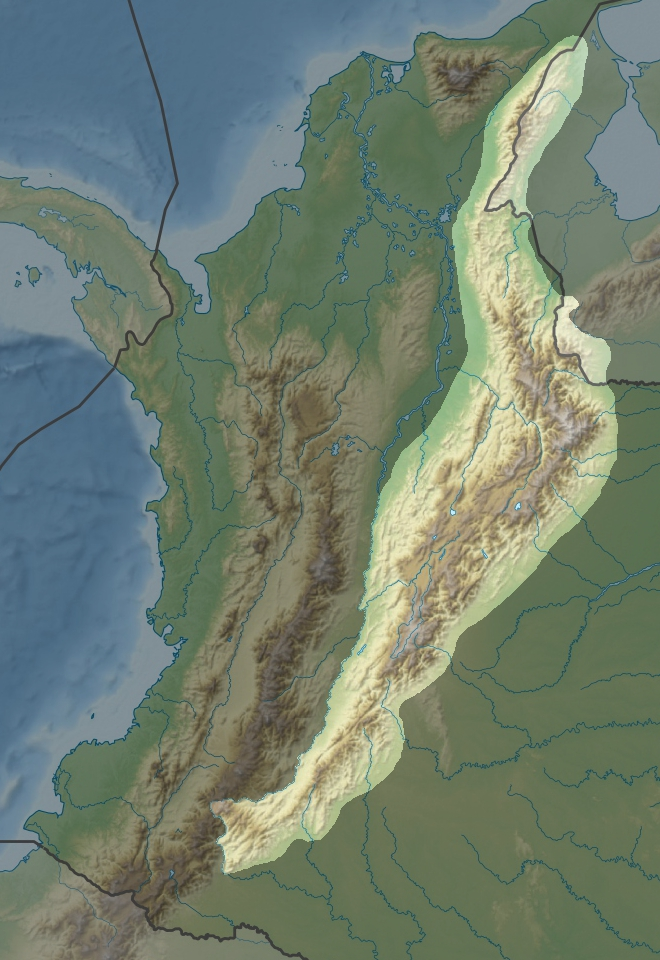

Highest point
- Peak: Ritacuba Blanco
- Elevation: 5,410 m (17,750 ft)
- Listing: Altiplano Cundiboyacense, Serranía de los Yariguíes, Serranía de las Quinchas, Sierra Nevada del Cocuy, Serranía del Perijá

Dimensions
- Length: 1,200 km (750 mi) SW-NE
- Area: 144,252 km^{2} (55,696 mi^{2})

Geography
- Country: Colombia
- Parent range: Andes

Geology
- Rock age: Neoproterozoic-Holocene
- Mountain type: Andean Subduction-related orogen

The Cordillera Oriental (English: Eastern Ranges) is the widest of the three branches of the Colombian Andes. The range extends from south to north, dividing from the Colombian Massif in Huila Department to Norte de Santander Department where it splits into the Serranía del Perijá and the Cordillera de Mérida in the Venezuelan Andes. The highest peak is Ritacuba Blanco at 5,410 m (17,750 ft) in the Sierra Nevada del Cocuy.

== Formation ==
The formation of the Cordillera Oriental is a complex process that occurred over different geological time scales.

The Neoproterozoic era, spanning from approximately 1 billion to 541 million years ago, refers to the time when some of the rocks that make up the Cordillera Oriental were formed. However, the mountain-building process that shaped the range into its current form is more recent.

The Andean orogeny, which formed the modern Cordillera Oriental, occurred in several phases, starting around 25 million years ago during the Oligocene epoch of the Cenozoic era. This process is still ongoing, with continued tectonic activity shaping the region.

The formation of the Cordillera Oriental in Colombia is a complex process involving tectonic plate movements. The Andes mountain range, including the Cordillera Oriental, was formed due to the subduction of the Nazca Plate under the South American Plate.

Some key points about the tectonic plates involved:

- Nazca Plate: A small oceanic plate being subducted beneath the South American Plate.
- South American Plate: A continental plate that is overriding the Nazca Plate, resulting in the formation of the Andes mountain range.

The subduction process has led to volcanic activity, earthquakes, and the creation of the Cordillera Oriental's complex geological structure.

== Geography ==
The western part of the Cordillera Oriental belongs to the Magdalena River basin, while the eastern part includes the river basins of the Amazon River, Orinoco River, and Catatumbo River. Within it, the Altiplano Cundiboyacense and the Sierra Nevada del Cocuy (with the only snowy peaks in this mountain range) stand out. The mountain range contains the most páramos in the world.

The Cordillera Oriental montane forests ecoregion covers the eastern slopes of the cordillera and its northern end. The Magdalena Valley montane forests cover the western slopes. The Northern Andean páramo covers the highest elevations.

== Protected areas ==
- Cueva de los Guácharos
- Chingaza National Natural Park
- Yariguíes National Park
- Sierra Nevada del Cocuy
- Sumapaz Páramo
- Tamá National Natural Park
- Los Estoraques Unique Natural Area
- Lake Iguaque
- Guanentá Alto Río Fonce Flora and Fauna Sanctuary
- Catatumbo Barí National Natural Park
- Los Picachos National Natural Park
- Pisba National Natural Park

== See also ==
- Geography of Colombia
- Altiplano Cundiboyacense, Bogotá savanna, Tenza Valley
- Cordillera Central, Occidental, Andean Region, Venezuelan Andes, continuation of this mountain system
- List of mountains in Colombia
