= San Juan de Rioseco =

- Municipality and town
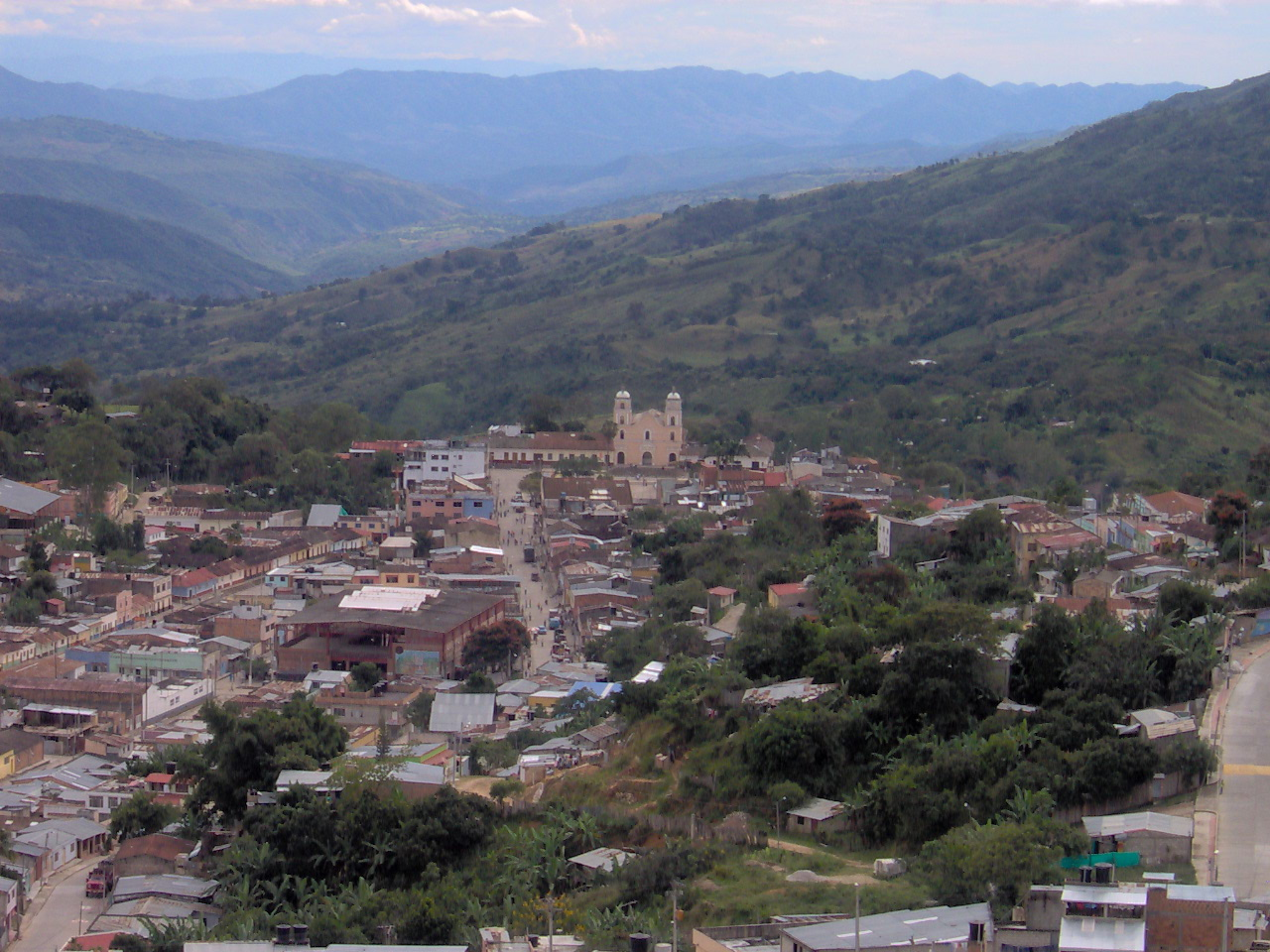
- Looking south across San Juan

- Flag Coat of arms

- Location of the municipality and town inside Cundinamarca Department of Colombia

- Location in Colombia
- Coordinates: 4°50′55″N 74°37′14″W
- Country: Colombia
- Department: Cundinamarca
- Elevation: 1,260 m (4,130 ft)

Population (Census 2018)
  - Total: 7,547
- Time zone: UTC-5 (Colombia Standard Time)

San Juan de Rioseco is a municipality and town of Colombia in the department of Cundinamarca with a population of about 10,000 people. It lies in mountainous terrain in the coffee land at an altitude of about 4,000 feet, high above the Magdalena River, on the western slope of Colombia's eastern cordillera about 60 miles from Bogotá by car. On a clear day the snow-capped peaks of four volcanos in the central cordillera (Nevado del Tolima, Nevado del Quindío, Nevado de Santa Isabel, and Nevado del Ruiz) can be seen in the distance to the west.

The main industry of the region is agriculture, principally coffee grown in small farms on steep slopes in the shade provided by banana trees, guava trees, cacao trees, papaya trees, and other tropical trees, the fruit from which provides an additional income crop for farmers. Higuerilla, the seeds of which yield a fine oil, is another cash crop. Coffee in the San Juan area is still grown and processed in traditional ways, and at some times of the year, coffee is spread out to dry on sunny days in a small plaza located northeast of the central plaza.

Daytime temperatures, year-round, commonly range in the 70s and 80s (degrees Fahrenheit), dropping into the 60s at night. A lovely, light fog often drifts through the air in early morning. Heavy rainstorms are common, but usually of short duration.

The town is busy by day, and the central plaza, dominated by a twin-towered Catholic church on the south side, provides a gathering place for the local population in the evenings, when street-vendors sell delicious arepas and chorizos, and cafés with outdoor seating serve soft drinks and beer. The Rapicono (nearby but off plaza) is a popular spot for an ice cream dessert or a traditional, Colombian fruit cocktail called salpicón.

San Juan and the surrounding area have a variety of birds of all colors: blues, reds, yellows, greens, browns, and blacks. Many dogs socialize throughout the town during the day and return home in the early evening. Local roosters coax their hens to their roosts at 6:00 pm every day and wake the town in the early morning with their quiquiriquís.

The families of some prominent politicians and farmers of Colombia have come from San Juan de Ricoseco. One of them is the maternal family of former President Julio César Turbay Ayala. Another is the family of Lucila López Poveda de García, the first woman elected to the Asamblea of the Department of Tolima, and her uncle Roberto Poveda Ramírez, a coffee farmer legendary in the region who had a large plantation at La Muchagua, about four miles by car west of San Juan. Also from San Juan were the family of Doctor Eduardo Millan Millan (Magistrado de la Corte Suprema de Justicia, the Supreme Court of Colombia), Ingeniero Alfonso Santos Montero (Senador de la República and Rector of both Universidad de Cundinamarca and Universidad Libre), and Álvaro Cruz Vargas (twice governor of Cundinamarca, stripped of his office for embezzlement).
