= Los Nevados National Natural Park =

Colombian national park in the Andes

- Parque Nacional Natural Los Nevados
- IUCN category II (national park)
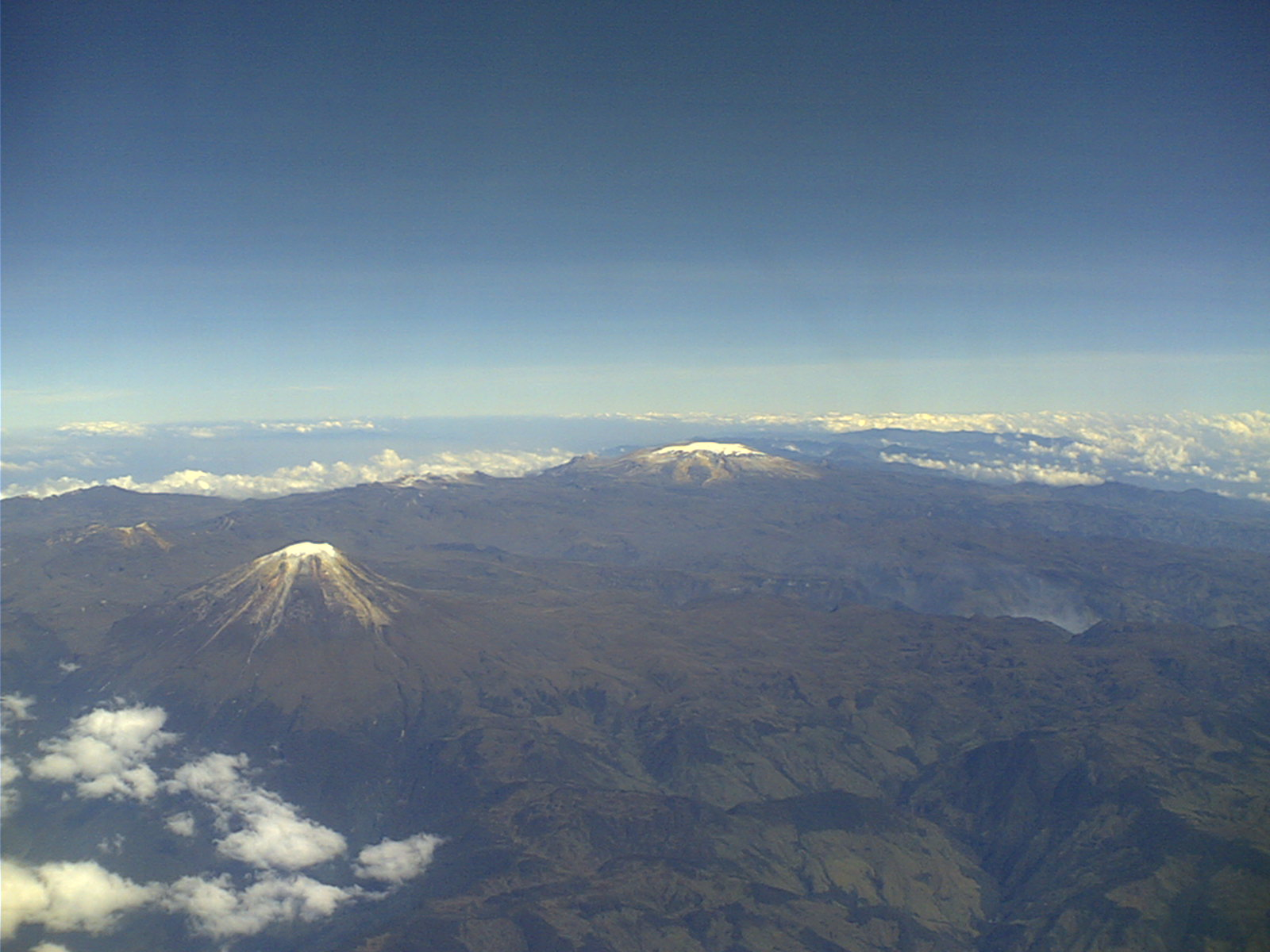
- Aerial view of Los Nevados National Park

- Location within Colombia
- Location: Caldas, Risaralda, Quindío and Tolima, Colombia
- Nearest city: Armenia - Ibagué - Manizales - Pereira
- Coordinates: 4°48′00″N 75°22′00″W
- Area: 58,300 hectares (225 sq mi)
- Established: 1973
- Visitors: 39,904 (in 2016)
- Governing body: SINAP
- Website: Website

Los Nevados National Natural Park (Spanish: Parque Nacional Natural Los Nevados) is a national park located in the Cordillera Central of the Colombian Andes. The park features Colombia's highest and northernmost active volcanoes including the glacier-capped Nevado del Ruiz, Nevado del Tolima, and Nevado de Santa Isabel, and the formerly glaciated superpáramo peaks (paramillos) of Cisne, Santa Rosa and Quindío. Other elevated structures of volcanic origin within the park are Alto La Piraña, La Olleta, Cerro España, and the Peñas de Caracoli. Cerro Bravo and Cerro Machín are located outside the park but form part of the same volcanic region.

The park is located in the departments of Caldas, Quindío, Risaralda, Tolima and spans between the municipalities Manizales, Villamaría, Santa Rosa de Cabal, Pereira, Salento, Villahermosa, Anzoátegui, Santa Isabel, Murillo, Ibagué and Casabianca.

== State of the Park ==
The park was temporarily closed by the authorities on March 31, 2023 amid fears of a possible eruption amid increased activity from the Nevado del Ruiz Volcano. On August 10 2023, the National Natural Parks of Colombia issued a resolution to reopen the park, authorizing the entrance of visitors.

Entrance through Brisas sector (northern sector of the Park) is only allowed to Valle de las Tumbas since the Servicio Geológico Colombiano has declared Nevado del Ruiz Volcano's activity at Orange Alert Level (level II). It is highly recommended for visitors to consult the state of volcanic activity on the Servicio Geológico Colombiano's web page before visiting.

== Geology ==
Glacial activity has shaped the park's landscape 3,000 m (9,800 ft) above mean sea level, leaving U-shaped valleys and moraines behind. Extrusive igneous rock is dominant above 3,500 m (11,500 ft) on the eastern slopes and 2,200 m (7,200 ft) on the western slopes. The Otún Lake, which lies in an extinct volcano crater, and the Green Lake are located in the area.

== Hydrography ==
The protected area is important for the region because of the countless sources of water that originate within. Glaciers occupy 4% of the area belonging to the three volcanoes, Nevado del Ruiz, Nevado de Santa Isabel and Nevado del Tolima. The melting waters from the glaciers give birth to the rivers that originate in the park and that conform 10 basins and 19 streams of different sizes and characteristics; six of the basins flow into the Magdalena River watershed (Gualí, Lagunilla Recio Totare and Coello) and the remaining four (Chinchiná, Campoalegre, Otún and Quindío) into the Cauca River watershed.

The park's hydrographic networks supply water to over for 2,000,000 inhabitants in the region, to coffee-growers and to most of the rice and cotton crops in the Tolima Department.

The Otún wetland system, located within the Park, was declared an internationally important Ramsar Convention wetland.

== Glacial retreat ==
At the start of the 20th century, six peaks had glaciers: El Ruiz, Santa Isabel, Tolima, El Cisne, Quindío and Santa Rosa. The glaciers reached as low as 4000-4500 meters above sea level.

The phenomenon of glacial retreat has been severe since the mid-twentieth century. Of the former six peaks with glaciers, there are currently only three: Nevado del Ruiz, Nevado de Santa Isabel and Nevado de Tolima. The glaciers of the three lower peaks (Quindío, El Cisne, and Santa Rosa) melted completely by the 1960s. The ice line is now above 4800 meters in elevation.

In 2002, IDEAM warned about the melting of the ice caps of the snow-capped mountains of the national park. Further proof of this was the disappearance of the Ice Cathedrals, which were huge caverns in the lower part of the Nevado del Ruiz glaciers. They existed before 1995 and were frequented by climbers.

The surviving glaciers face a constant process of melting, the situation being critical for the Tolima and Santa Isabel volcanoes, whose glacial areas are less than one square kilometer each. These two glaciers are expected to disappear between 2030 and 2040.

== Flora and fauna ==
The park is composed of diverse ecosystems that change depending on the altitude. The lower regions of the park are composed of Andean forests, high Andean forests and high Andean wetlands. The higher regions of the park consist of the páramo and super-páramo ecosystems. The páramo is composed of grassland, peat bog, scrubland, swamps and lagoons and occupies 80% of the park's area. The super-páramo is a lunar-like landscape, composed of rocks, ashes, and sparse vegetation.

=== Flora ===
The area is home to 1250 species of vascular plants, 200 bryophytes, 300 lichens and 180 macroscopic fungi. On the lower slopes and in the valleys the Andean wax palms are dominant. The upper Andean forest has trees reaching up to 30 m (98 ft) in height. In the páramo, frailejones dominate the landscape and a range of mosses, lichens can be observed. Coulored algae can be found in the various lagoons.

=== Fauna ===
Noteworthy birds include blue-crowned motmot, yellow-eared parrot, Fuertes's parrot, rufous-fronted parakeet, Andean condor, brown-banded antpitta and ruddy duck. The buffy helmetcrest hummingbird is endemic to the region. Noteworthy mammals include the mountain tapir, spectacled bear, northern pudú, oncilla, cougar and white-eared opossum.

== Notable peaks ==
The following mountains in the park have an elevation of at least 4500 meters and a topographic prominence of at least 100 meters. Some mountains have multiple peaks, in which case only data for the highest one is listed. (Note: Note that topographic data vary slightly in accuracy/precision due to surveying history and techniques, changing environmental conditions (e.g. melting snow and ice), and digital model selection, which lead to some disagreement between sources.)

#	Peak	Coord.	Dept.	Elev. (m)	Prom. (m)	Col (m)	Jut (m)	Remarks
1	Nevado del Ruiz	4.8926°N 75.3238°W	Caldas, Tolima	5321	2056	3265	635	Active stratovolcano composed of several domes, cones, caldera, and glaciers. Elevation estimates range from 5279 m to 5321 m. Highest point in Caldas. Associated Indigenous terms: Kumanday; Tama; Tabuchía.
2	Nevado del Tolima	4.6583°N 75.3297°W	Tolima	5276	1294	3982	1159	Active stratovolcano with caldera and glaciers. Elevation estimates range from 5215 m to 5276 m. Highest mountain entirely within Tolima. Associated Indigenous terms: Tol-Ima; Dulima; Yulima; Tarib.
3	Nevado de Santa Isabel	4.8182°N 75.3657°W	Caldas, Risaralda, Tolima	4950	505	4445	480	Active shield volcano, composed of three domes almost equal in height, with glaciers. The southern dome is the highest point in Risaralda. Associated Indigenous terms: Poleka Kasue; Tataquí.
4	La Olleta Volcano	4.8930°N 75.3539°W	Caldas	4875	170	4705	583	Pleistocene-age adventitious volcano (parasitic cone) of Nevado del Ruiz Volcanic Complex, with intermittent snow. Highest peak entirely within Caldas.
5	Nevado (Paramillo) del Quindío	4.7010°N 75.3859°W	Quindío, Risaralda, Tolima	4760	381	4379	476	Potentially active stratovolcano composed of six peaks similar in height, with intermittent snow. Highest point in Quindío. Associated Indigenous terms: Quindiu; Quinde; Kinti; Q'inti.
6	Nevado (Paramillo) del Cisne	4.8427°N 75.3454°W	Caldas, Tolima	4700	255	4445	423	Recently active lava dome composed of several peaks of similar height, including Morro Negro. Intermittent snow.
7	Paramillo de Santa Rosa	4.7997°N 75.4576°W	Risaralda	4600	515	4085	606	Recently active stratovolcano composed of several peaks of similar height, with intermittent snow. Highest mountain entirely within Risaralda.
8	Peñas de Caracoli (Cerros de Alsacia)	4.7346°N 75.3824°W	Risaralda, Tolima	4600	175	4425	371	Chain of small recently active volcanic cones and domes of similar heights (from north to south: Otún, Azulero, Alsacia, El Condor, Totarito, Arenero, San Carlos, Caracoli); together with Cerro España they comprise the Cerro España Volcanic Complex. Intermittent snow.
9	La Piraña Volcano	4.9015°N 75.2865°W	Tolima	4600	140	4460	513	Pleistocene-age adventitious volcano (parasitic cone) of Nevado del Ruiz Volcanic Complex. Intermittent snow.
10	Cerro España Volcano	4.7552°N 75.3719°W	Tolima	4550	205	4345	353	Recently active stratovolcano with eroded caldera. Intermittent snow.

== Gallery ==
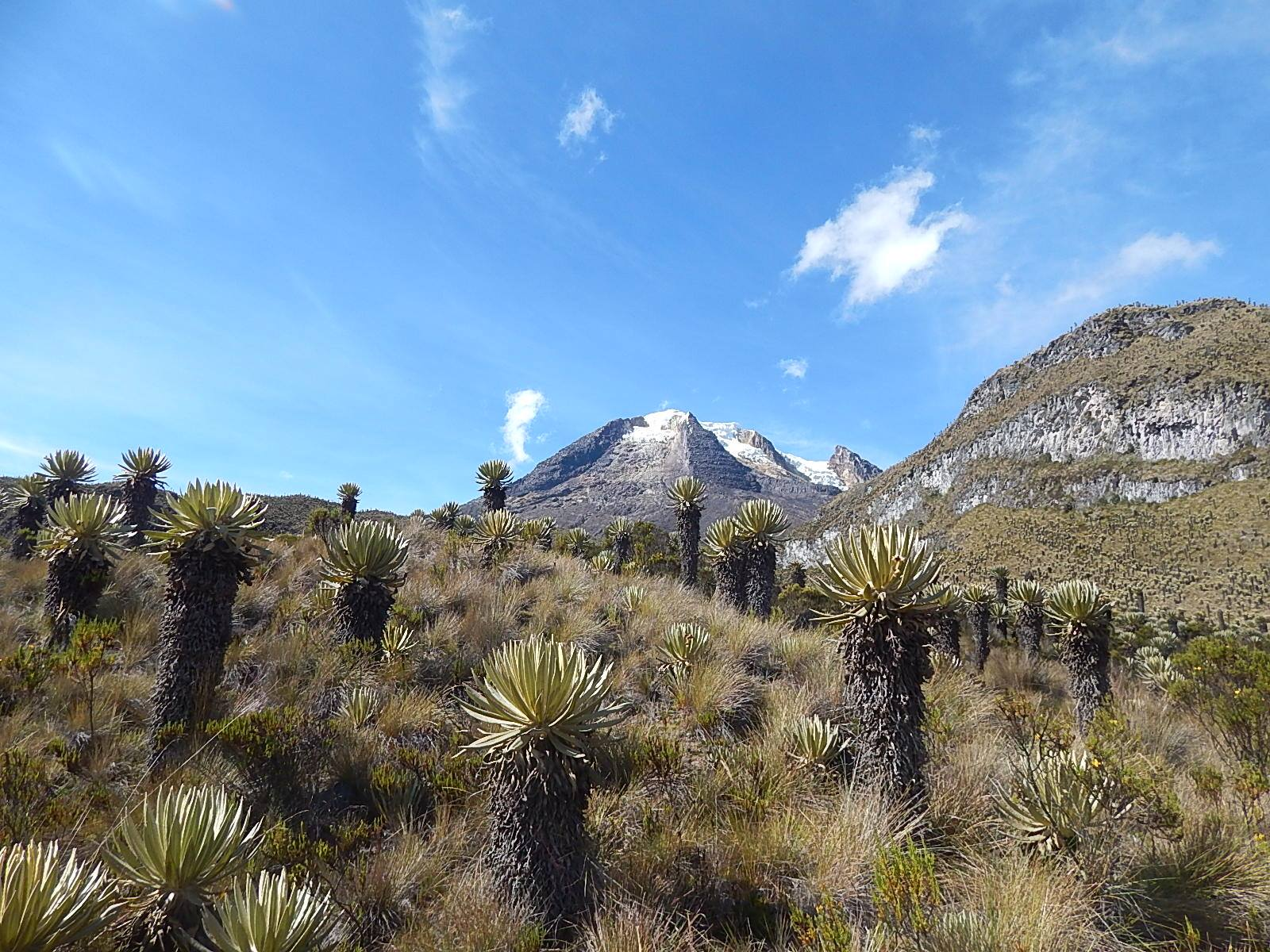
Nevado del Tolima

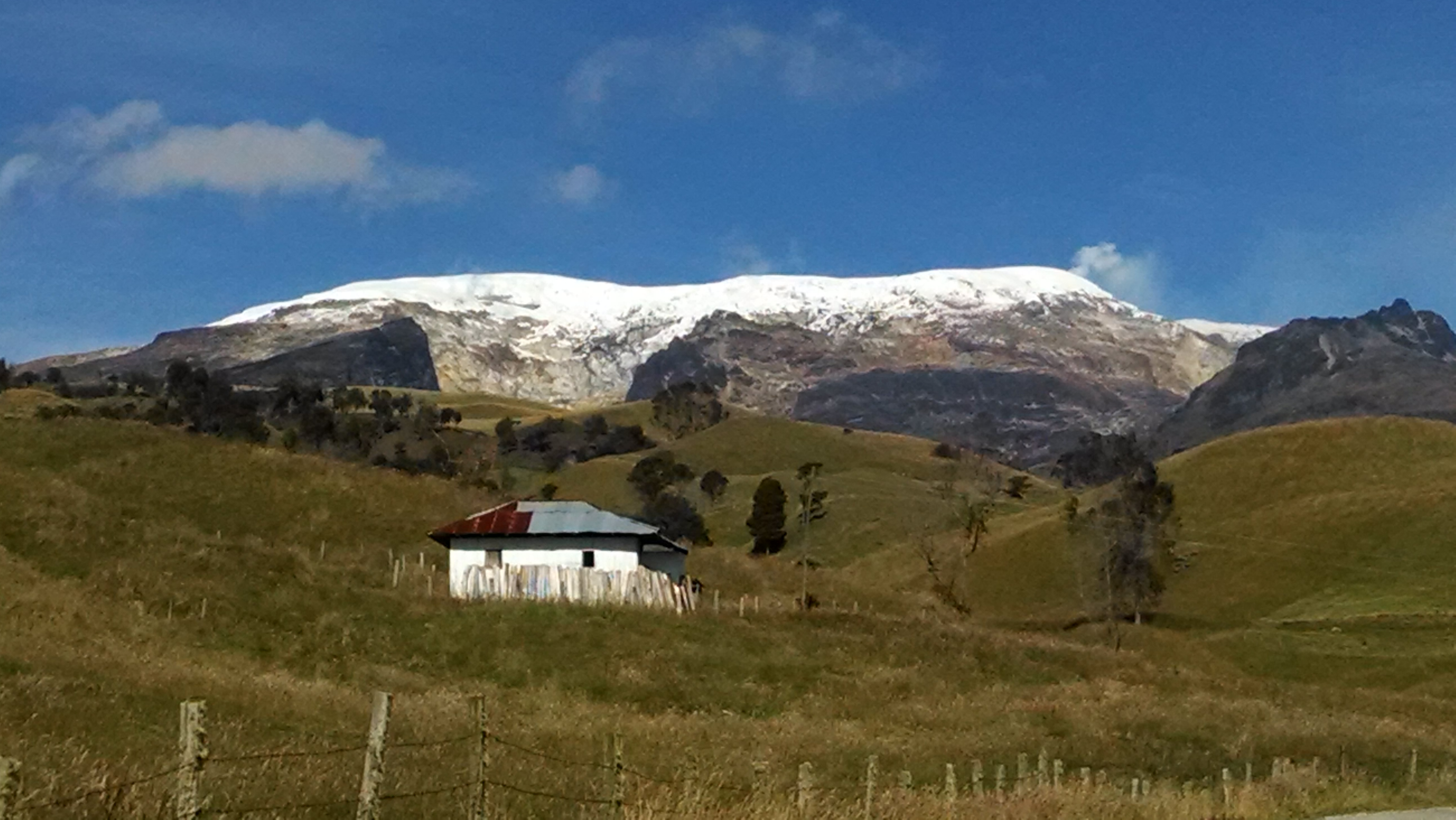
Nevado del Ruiz

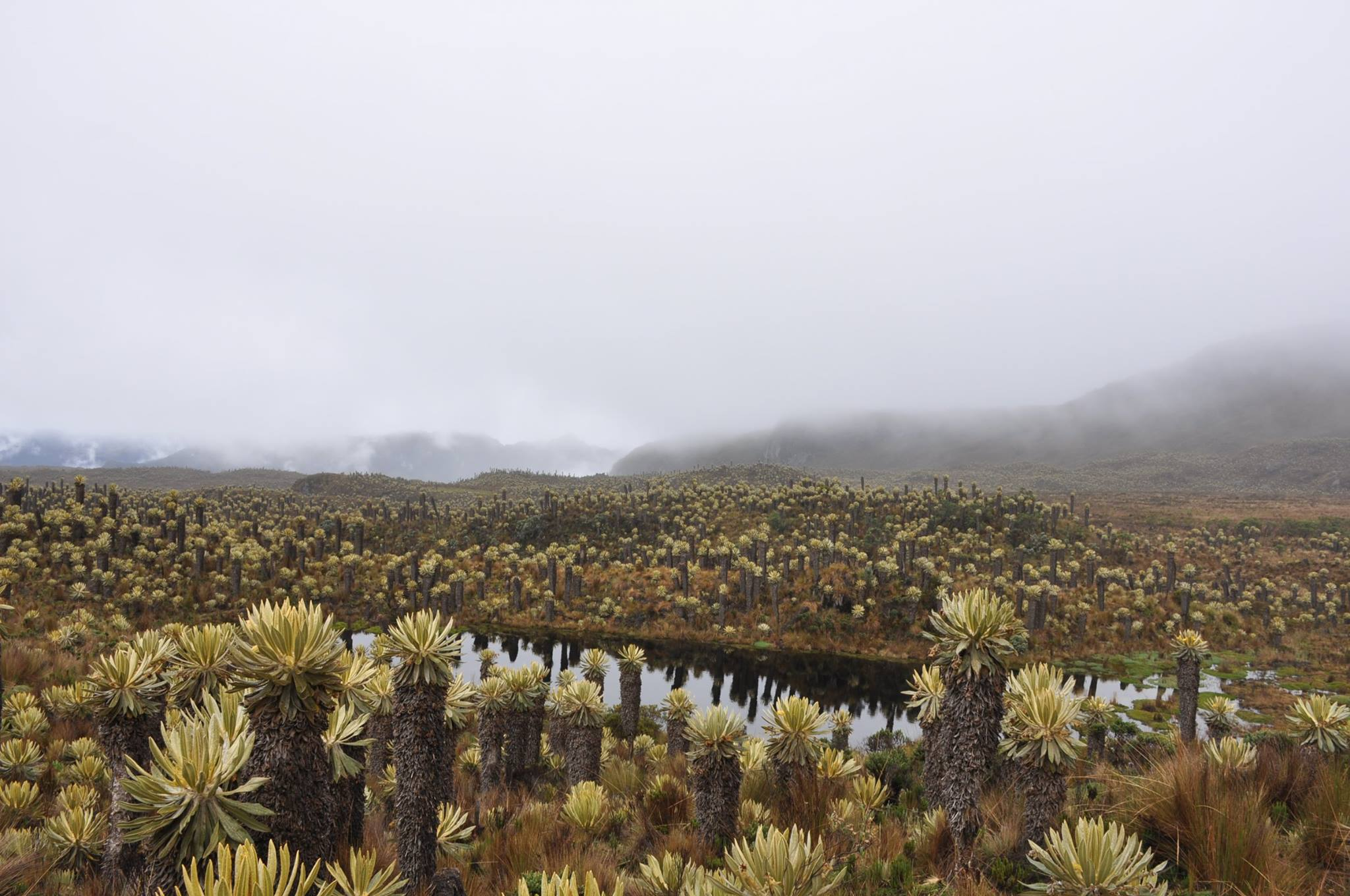
Nevado del Ruiz paramo

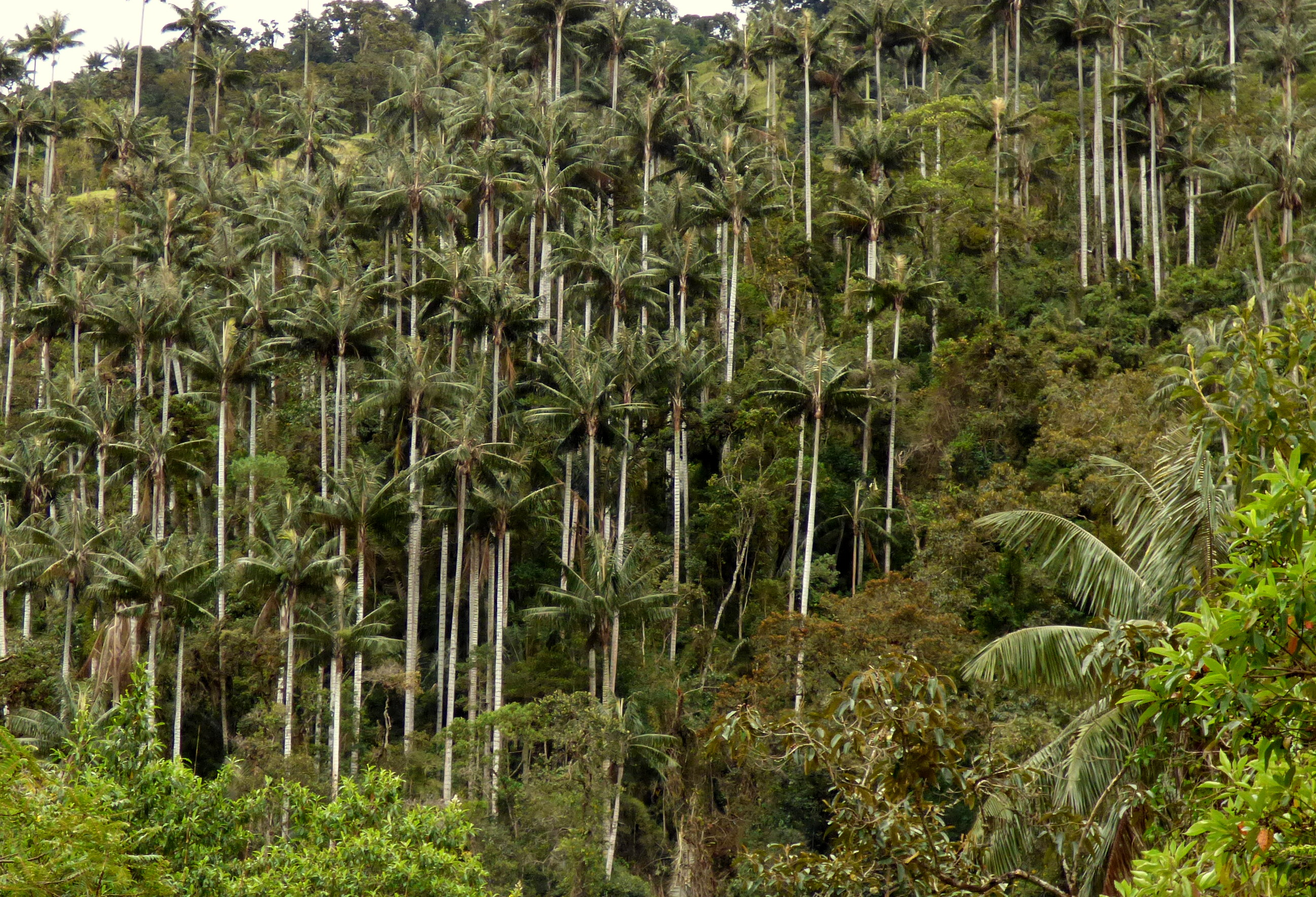
Wax palm

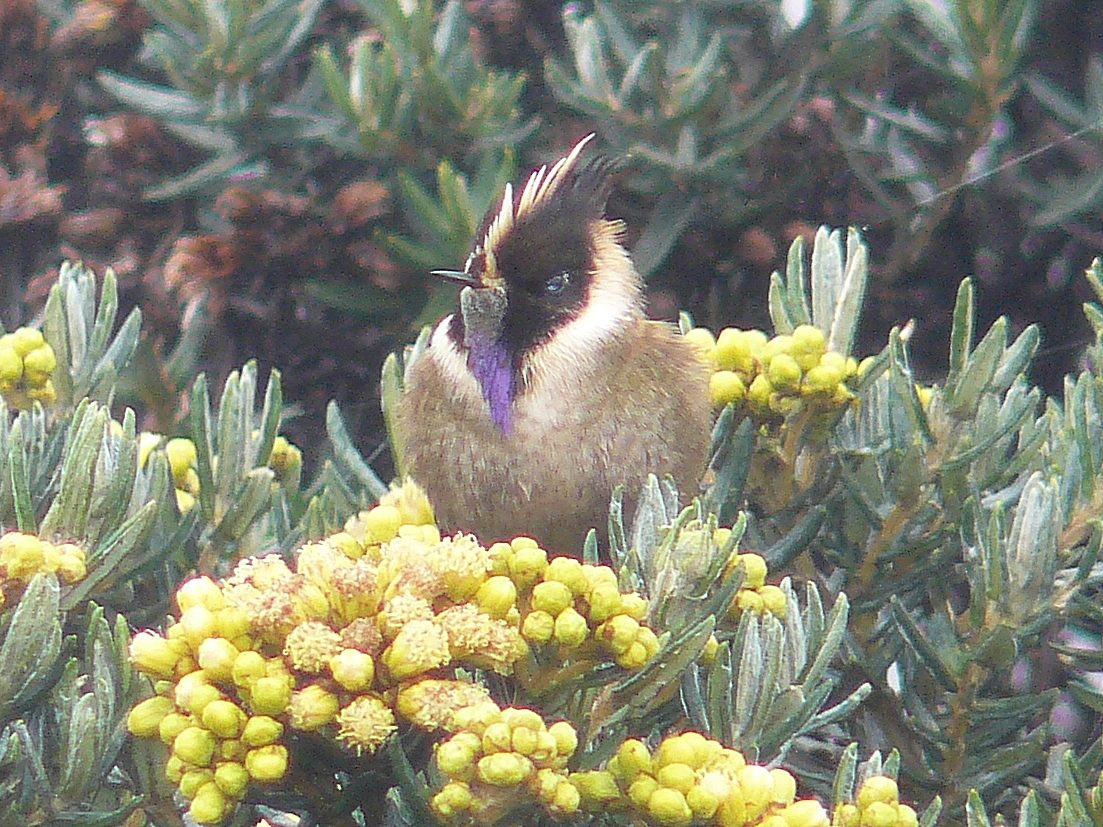
Buffy Helmetcrest (Oxypogon stuebelii)

== General references ==
- IUCN (1982), IUCN directory of neotropical protected areas (in Spanish and English), IUCN, ISBN 978-0-907567-62-2.
- Villegas, Benjamin; Sesana, Laura (2007), Colombia Natural Parks, Villegas Asociados, ISBN 978-958-8156-87-3.
