= Murillo, Tolima =

- Municipality and town
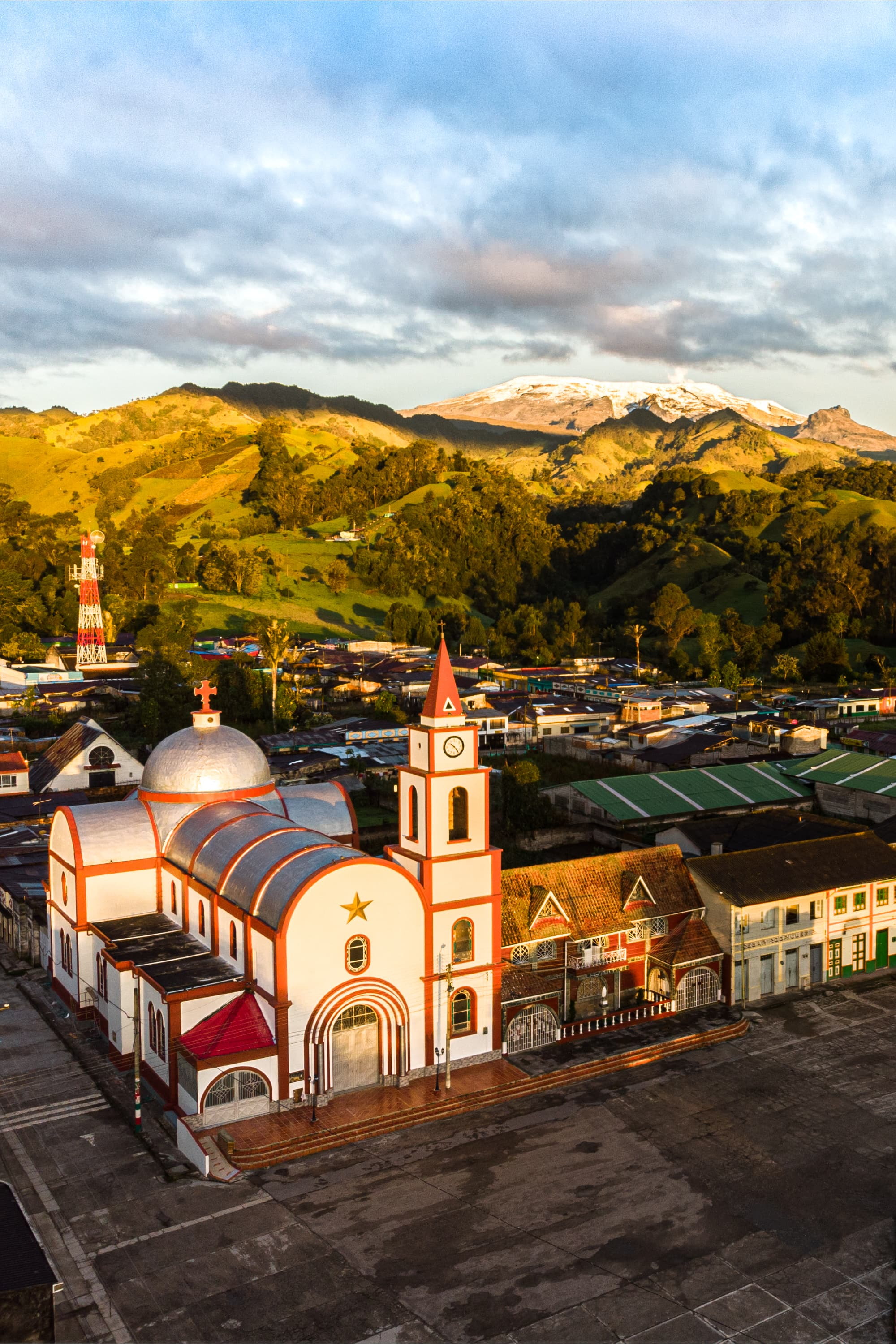
- Main square of Murillo with Nevado del Ruiz behind

- Flag Coat of arms

- Location of the municipality and town of Murillo, Tolima in the Tolima Department of Colombia.
- Coordinates: 4.874°N 75.171°W
- Country: Colombia
- Department: Tolima Department
- Aldea: 1887-10-24

Government
  - Alcaldesa Municipal: Beatriz Valencia Gómez

Area
  - Municipality and town: 417.29 km^{2} (161.12 sq mi)
  - Urban: 1.0 km^{2} (0.39 sq mi)
- Elevation: 2,950 m (9,680 ft)

Population (2005)
  - Municipality and town: 4,953
  - Density: 11.87/km^{2} (30.74/sq mi)
  - Urban: 1,569
- Time zone: UTC-5 (Colombia Standard Time)
- Website: http://www.murillo-tolima.gov.co/

Murillo is a town and municipality in the Tolima department of Colombia. The population of the municipality was 4,953 as of the 2005 census, 1,569 who lived within the town of Murillo, the remainder in rural areas of the municipality.

Murillo is 144 km from the provincial capital, Ibagué. The municipality is bordered on the north by Villahermosa, on the south by Santa Isabel, in the east by Líbano, and to the west by the Departments of Caldas and Risaralda. Murillo is the highest town in the department of Tolima with an altitude of 2950 m above sea level.

The western border of the municipality includes the peaks of Nevado del Ruiz, Nevado El Cisne, and Nevado Santa Isabel.

== Climate ==
Murillo has a cold subtropical highland climate (Cfb) with heavy rainfall year round.

Climate data for Murillo
Month	Jan	Feb	Mar	Apr	May	Jun	Jul	Aug	Sep	Oct	Nov	Dec	Year
Mean daily maximum °C (°F)	15.4 (59.7)	15.7 (60.3)	15.6 (60.1)	14.8 (58.6)	15.0 (59.0)	14.8 (58.6)	15.4 (59.7)	15.0 (59.0)	15.2 (59.4)	14.4 (57.9)	14.7 (58.5)	15.1 (59.2)	15.1 (59.2)
Daily mean °C (°F)	10.6 (51.1)	11.0 (51.8)	11.1 (52.0)	10.7 (51.3)	11.1 (52.0)	10.9 (51.6)	11.0 (51.8)	10.8 (51.4)	10.8 (51.4)	10.4 (50.7)	10.6 (51.1)	10.6 (51.1)	10.8 (51.4)
Mean daily minimum °C (°F)	5.9 (42.6)	6.3 (43.3)	6.7 (44.1)	6.6 (43.9)	7.2 (45.0)	7.0 (44.6)	6.7 (44.1)	6.7 (44.1)	6.5 (43.7)	6.4 (43.5)	6.5 (43.7)	6.1 (43.0)	6.6 (43.8)
Average rainfall mm (inches)	108 (4.3)	116 (4.6)	152 (6.0)	252 (9.9)	247 (9.7)	169 (6.7)	122 (4.8)	133 (5.2)	204 (8.0)	244 (9.6)	220 (8.7)	133 (5.2)	2,100 (82.7)
Average rainy days	11	12	16	19	19	13	11	11	15	19	18	13	177
Source 1:
Source 2:
