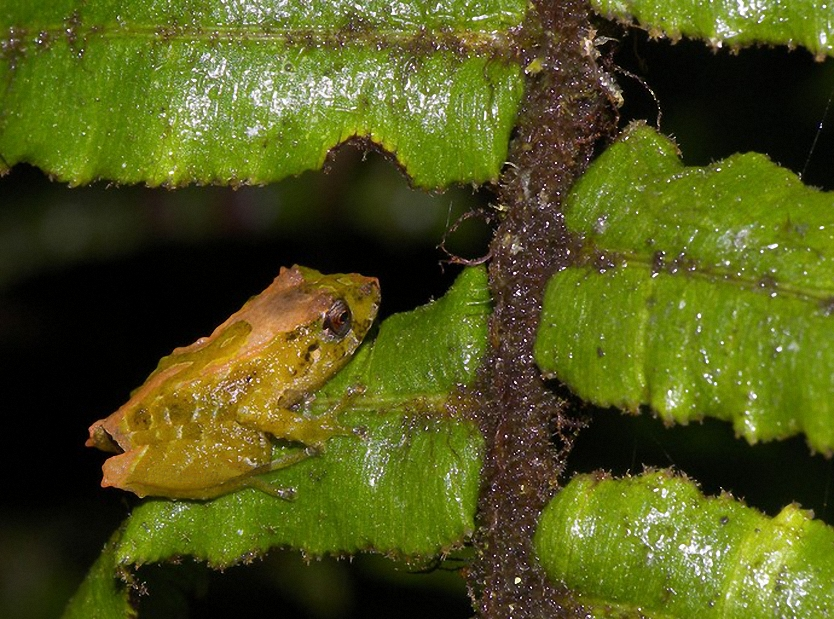

Conservation status
- Least Concern (IUCN 3.1)

Scientific classification
- Kingdom: Animalia
- Phylum: Chordata
- Class: Amphibia
- Order: Anura
- Family: Strabomantidae
- Genus: Pristimantis
- Subgenus: Pristimantis
- Species: P. uranobates

Binomial name
- Pristimantis uranobates (Lynch, 1991)

Synonyms
- Eleutherodactylus uranobates Lynch, 1991

= Pristimantis uranobates =

Species of frog

Pristimantis uranobates is a species of frog in the family Strabomantidae. It is endemic to Colombia and occurs in the Cordillera Central as well as on the western slopes of Cordillera Occidental in Tolima, Quindío, Caldas, Risaralda, and Antioquia Departments. The specific name uranobates is derived from Greek ouranos and bates, meaning "one who haunts the heavens". This refers to "the lofty habitat of the species in the Los Nevados district of Colombia". Common name Caldas robber frog has been coined for it.

== Description ==
Adult males measure 16–20 mm (0.63–0.79 in) and adult females 23–28 mm (0.91–1.10 in) in snout–vent length. The head is wider than the body. The snout is rounded. The canthus rostralis and supra-tympanic fold are prominent, the latter obscuring upper edge of tympanum. The fingers bear narrow lateral fringes and rounded discs. The toes are long, have lateral fringes, and bear discs that are twice as large as the finger ones. Dorsal skin is shagreened and has some scattered warts. The dorsum is reddish-brown and has darker brown markings and cream to orange dorsolateral folds, but the actual pattern is polymorphic. The flanks have brown to black bars on dirty cream to orange-brown ground color. The throat is gold to dull copper-brown, while the venter is greenish-yellow and has brown spots or reticulation.

== Habitat and conservation ==
Pristimantis uranobates occurs in cloud forests and paramos at elevations of 1,750–3,600 m (5,740–11,810 ft) above sea level. It is very common on low vegetation by roads and streams. During the day, they can be found under rocks and logs, whereas at night they climb to vegetation, mostly no higher than half a metre above the ground.

This species is very common and adaptable. No major threats to it are known, although chytridiomycosis remains a potential threat. It occurs at least in the Los Nevados National Natural Park.
