= Cerro Machín =

Volcano in Colombia

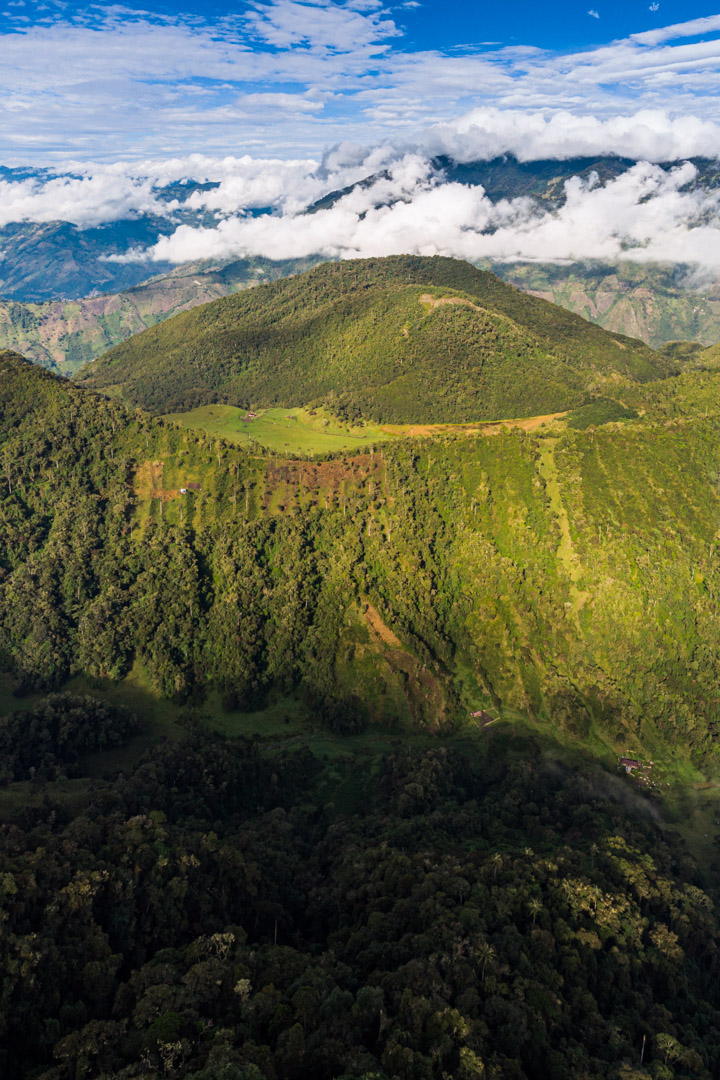
- Cerro Machín in 2021

Highest point
- Elevation: 2,749 m (9,019 ft)
- Listing: Volcanoes of Colombia
- Coordinates: 04°29′00″N 75°23′30″W

Geography
- Location within Colombia
- Location: Tolima; Colombia
- Parent range: Central Ranges; Andes

Geology
- Rock age: Pleistocene
- Mountain type: Stratovolcano
- Last eruption: 1180 ± 150 years

Cerro Machín is a stratovolcano located in Tolima Department, Colombia. Considered the most dangerous active volcano of Colombia, Cerro Machin is a volcanic plug that is approximately the same age (1,000,000+ years) as the Ruiz-Tolima Massif and has the appearance of being part of that volcanic system.

Cerro Machín is a 2.4km-wide tuff ring volcano. It was last known to actively erupt 800 years ago.

Its sisters are Nevado del Tolima, 17,060 feet (5,200 m); Santa Isabel, 16,240 feet (4,950 m), Nevado del Ruiz, 17,457 feet (5,321 m), plus nine other lesser volcanoes and a 10,000 feet (3,000 m) volcanic South Wall containing in excess of thirty volcanic domes.

== Gallery ==
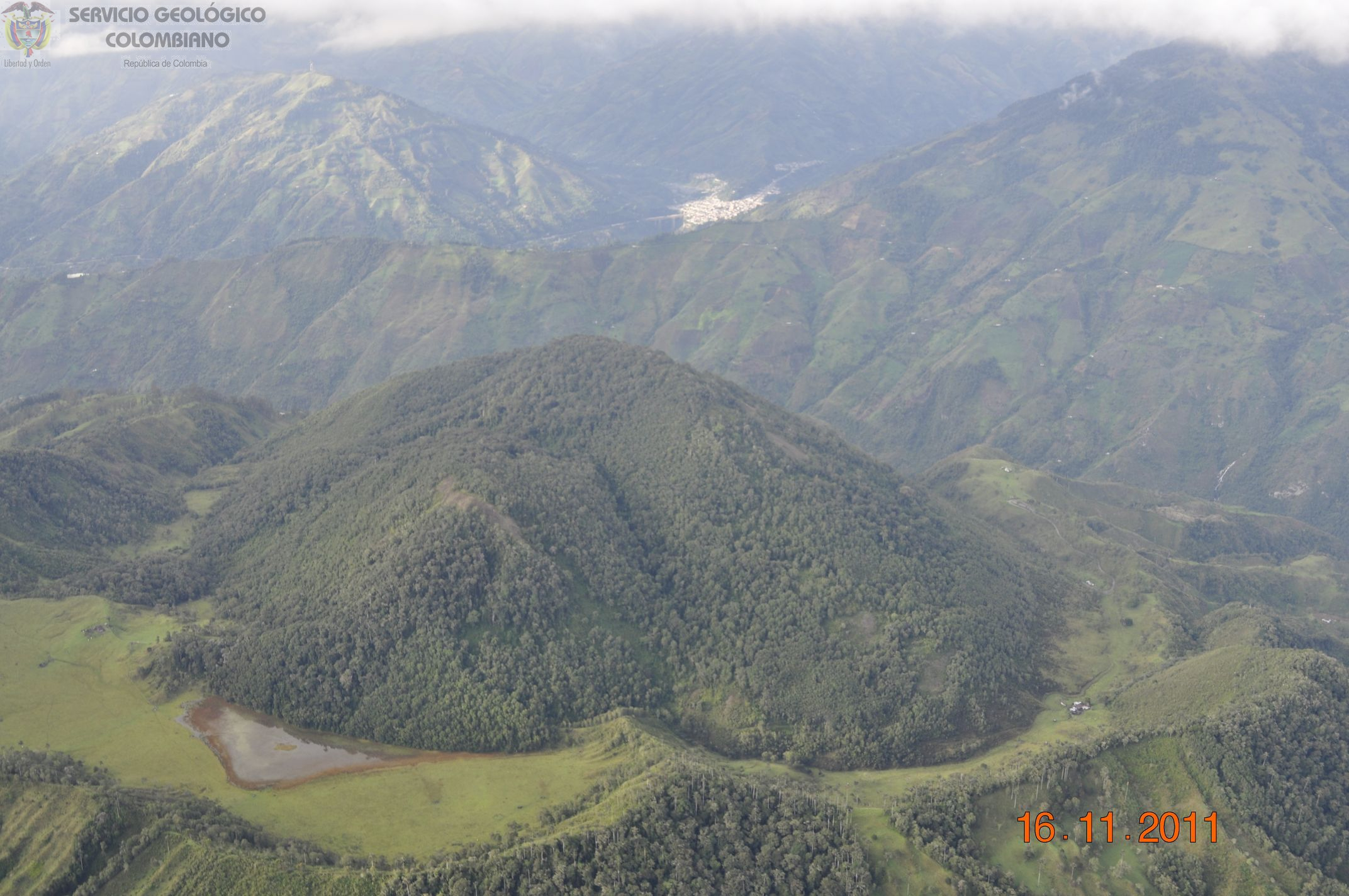
2011

== See also ==
- Nevado del Ruiz
- Mauna Loa
