= Nevado del Tolima =

Active volcano in Colombia

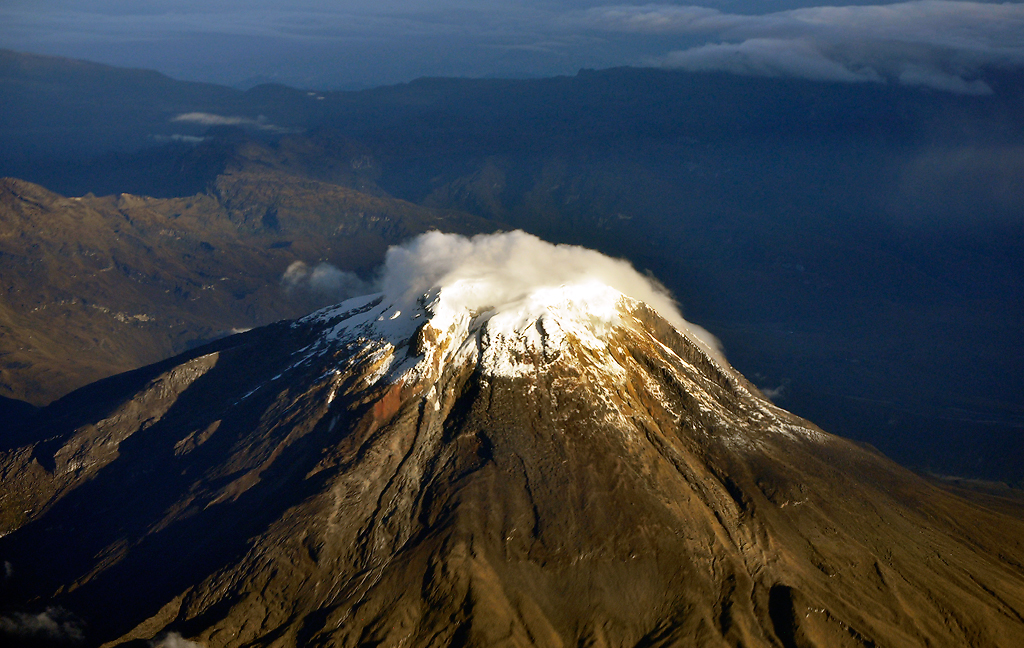
- View of Nevado del Tolima

Highest point
- Elevation: 5,276 m (17,310 ft)
- Prominence: 1,238 m (4,062 ft)
- Listing: Volcanoes of Colombia
- Coordinates: 4°39′30″N 75°19′46″W

Geography
- Location within Colombia
- Location: Tolima, Colombia
- Parent range: Central Ranges, Andes

Geology
- Rock age(s): <40 ka Late Pleistocene-recent
- Mountain type: Andesitic stratovolcano
- Volcanic belt: North Volcanic Zone; Andean Volcanic Belt
- Last eruption: March 1943

The Nevado del Tolima is a Late Pleistocene to recently active andesitic stratovolcano located in the Tolima department, Colombia. The volcano lies south of Nevado del Ruiz volcano and is situated within the Los Nevados National Natural Park. The volcano, whose most recent activity dates to 1943 and last major eruption around 3600 years ago, overlies the Eocene El Bosque Batholith, dated at 49.1 ± 1.7 Ma.

== Geography and geology ==
The steep-sided, glacier-clad Nevado del Tolima volcano contrasts with the broad profile of Nevado del Ruiz to the north. The andesitic-dacitic younger Tolima formed during the past 40,000 years, rising above and largely obscuring a 3 kilometres (1.9 mi) wide Late Pleistocene caldera. The summit consists of a cluster of Late Pleistocene to Holocene lava domes that were associated with thick block-lava flows on the northern and eastern flanks, and extensive pyroclastic-flow deposits. The summit contains a funnel-shaped crater 200 to 300 metres (660 to 980 ft) deep. Holocene activity has included explosive eruptions ranging in size from moderate to plinian. The last major eruption took place about 3600 years ago. Lava dome growth has produced block and ash flows that traveled primarily to the northeast and southeast.

=== Hydrology ===
The snow-capped Nevado del Tolima, with its almost symmetrical structure, has a radial drainage pattern in the upper part. The residual glacier on the top of the mountain feeds the rivers Totare, San Romualdo, Toche and Combeima. The latter is the main water source of the municipality of Ibagué. All these currents drain into the eastern slope of the Cordillera Central, directly into the Magdalena River.

== Flora and Fauna ==
- Espeletia (commonly known as 'frailejones')

The frailejon plant has evolved throughout the years to enhance its survival. It has the ability to absorb water from the atmosphere and can resist the freezing altitude temperatures of the páramo biome, where it is found.

== Los Nevados National Park ==
The Nevado del Tolima is located within the Los Nevados National Natural Park, In addition to the Nevado del Tolima, seven other volcanoes are located in the park: Nevado del Ruiz, Santa Isabel, Nevado del Quindío, Paramillo de Santa Rosa, Cerro Bravo, Cerro Machín and Nevado El Cisne.

The park spans 58,300 hectares (144,000 acres) and stretches across the departments of Caldas, Quindío, Risaralda, and Tolima. The park is administratively part of the municipalities Villamaría, Santa Rosa de Cabal, Pereira, Salento, and Ibagué.

== Eruptive history ==
Holocene activity has included explosive eruptions ranging in size from moderate to plinian. The last major eruption took place about 3600 years ago. Lava dome growth has produced block and ash flows that traveled primarily to the NE and SE. Minor explosive eruptions have been recorded from Tolima in the 19th and 20th centuries.

== See also ==
- List of volcanoes in Colombia
- List of mountains in Colombia
- List of volcanoes by elevation
