= Agrado =

Municipality and town in Huila Department, Colombia

- Flag Coat of arms

- Location of the municipality and town of El Agrado in the Huila Department of Colombia

- Location within Colombia
- Coordinates: 2°15′N 75°47′W
- Country: Colombia
- Department: Huila
- Subregion: Centro
- Founded: 24 March 1753
- Municipality erected: 5 April 1837

Government
  - Mayor: María Nelffy Rincón Méndez (2024–2027)

Area
  - City: 192.1 km^{2} (74.2 sq mi)
- Elevation: 907 m (2,976 ft)

Population (2025)
  - City: 9,630
  - Urban: 6,130
- Demonym(s): Agraduno, -a
- Time zone: UTC−5
- Website: www.elagrado-huila.gov.co

Agrado is a municipality of Colombia located in the central subregion of the Huila Department. It lies in the Magdalena River valley on the foothills of a mountainous region made up of the orographic features of the Serranía de las Minas and the Pan de Azúcar hill. Its territorial extent is 286 km^{2} (110 sq mi), its elevation is 838 m (2,749 ft) above sea level, and its average temperature is 24 °C (75 °F).

It has a population of 9,275 inhabitants according to a 2019 projection by the DANE. It is part of the Subcentro Region of the department. Its economic base is agriculture, with crops of coffee, sugarcane, plantain and vegetables. It is known as "Jardín Agraduno" ("Agraduno Garden").

== Climate ==
This section is summarized considering the regional climatic characteristics, according to the meteorological stations located in the area, which consist of rain gauges and one ordinary climatological station. The temperature ranges from 12 °C (54 °F) (winter early mornings) to 28 °C (82 °F) (summer midday), with a mean of 25 °C (77 °F). According to the Köppen classification, El Agrado has a hot dry BSh semi-arid climate. Average annual precipitation varies between 1,566 and 1,592 mm (1,566 mm (61.7 in) and 1,592 mm (62.7 in)), with two rainy periods during the months of March–April and October–November, and a period of scant precipitation in the months of July and August.

== Economy ==
The economic development of the municipality has been based especially on two aspects, the agricultural sector and the commercial sector, which have become the base of the economy and which need to be reactivated in order to position this territory as a model in the center of the department.

== Transportation ==
Distance in kilometers by road from El Agrado to other cities:

- El Agrado – Garzón: 19 km (12 mi)
- El Agrado – Pitalito: 89 km (55 mi)
- El Agrado – Neiva: 132 km (82 mi)
- El Agrado – Florencia: 136 km (85 mi)
- El Agrado – Mocoa: 221 km (137 mi)
- El Agrado – Popayán: 244 km (152 mi)
- El Agrado – Ibagué: 327 km (203 mi)
- El Agrado – Pasto: 365 km (227 mi)
- El Agrado – Cali: 366 km (227 mi)
- El Agrado – Bogotá: 427 km (265 mi)

== See also ==
- El Quimbo Dam
- Magdalena River
