= Coello River =

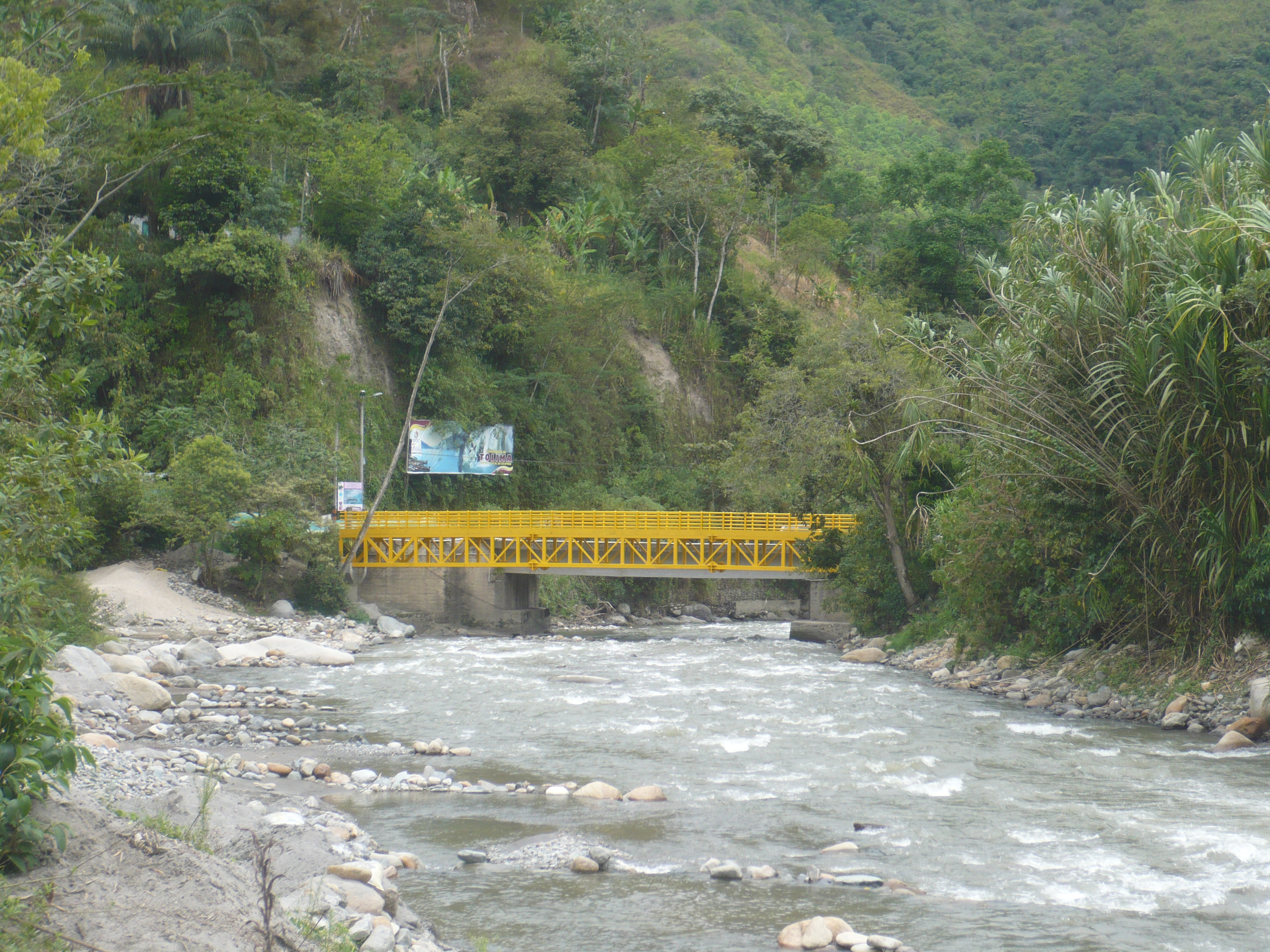
- Coello River in Coello-Cocora

Location
- Country: Colombia

Physical characteristics
- Source
  - location: Nevado del Tolima
  - elevation: 3,600 m (11,800 ft)
- Mouth
  - location: Magdalena River
  - coordinates: 4°17′22″N 74°53′31″W
  - elevation: 256 m (840 ft)
- Length: 111.6 km (69.3 mi)
- Basin size: 1,899 km^{2} (733 sq mi)

The Coello River is a river in Tolima Department of Colombia. It drains into the Caribbean Sea via the Magdalena River.

== See also ==
- List of rivers of Colombia
