= Lake Otún =

Lake in Colombia

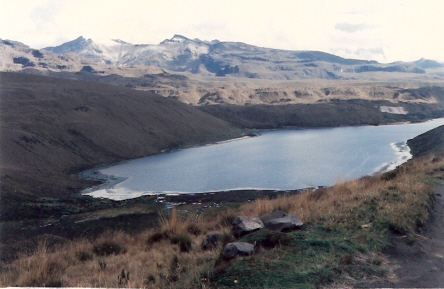

- Location within Colombia
- Location: Nevados National Park, Risaralda
- Coordinates: 4°46′33″N 75°24′53″W
- Primary outflows: Otún River
- Basin countries: Colombia
- Surface area: 1.5 km^{2} (0.58 sq mi)
- Surface elevation: 3,900 m (12,800 ft)

Ramsar Wetland
- Official name: Complejo de Humedales Laguna del Otún
- Designated: 25 June 2008
- Reference no.: 1781

Lake Otún (Laguna del Otún) is a small lake in the Nevados National Park, in the Risaralda department of Colombia. It located at an altitude of 3,900 m over an extinct crater and has an area of 1.5 square kilometres. The lake is of glacial origin and is fed by meltwaters of the Nevado Santa Isabel. Lake Otún is the source of the Otún River, which supplies drinking water to the cities of Pereira and Dosquebradas.

Lake Otún is an important breeding ground for several threatened or endangered bird species, including the Colombian torrent duck (Merganetta armata columbiana), the Colombian ruddy duck (Oxyura jamaicensis andina), the Andean teal (Anas andium) and the Andean snipe (Gallinago jamesoni).

Lake Otún contains a large population of rainbow trout, introduced for recreational fishing and a major attraction for visitors to the lake.

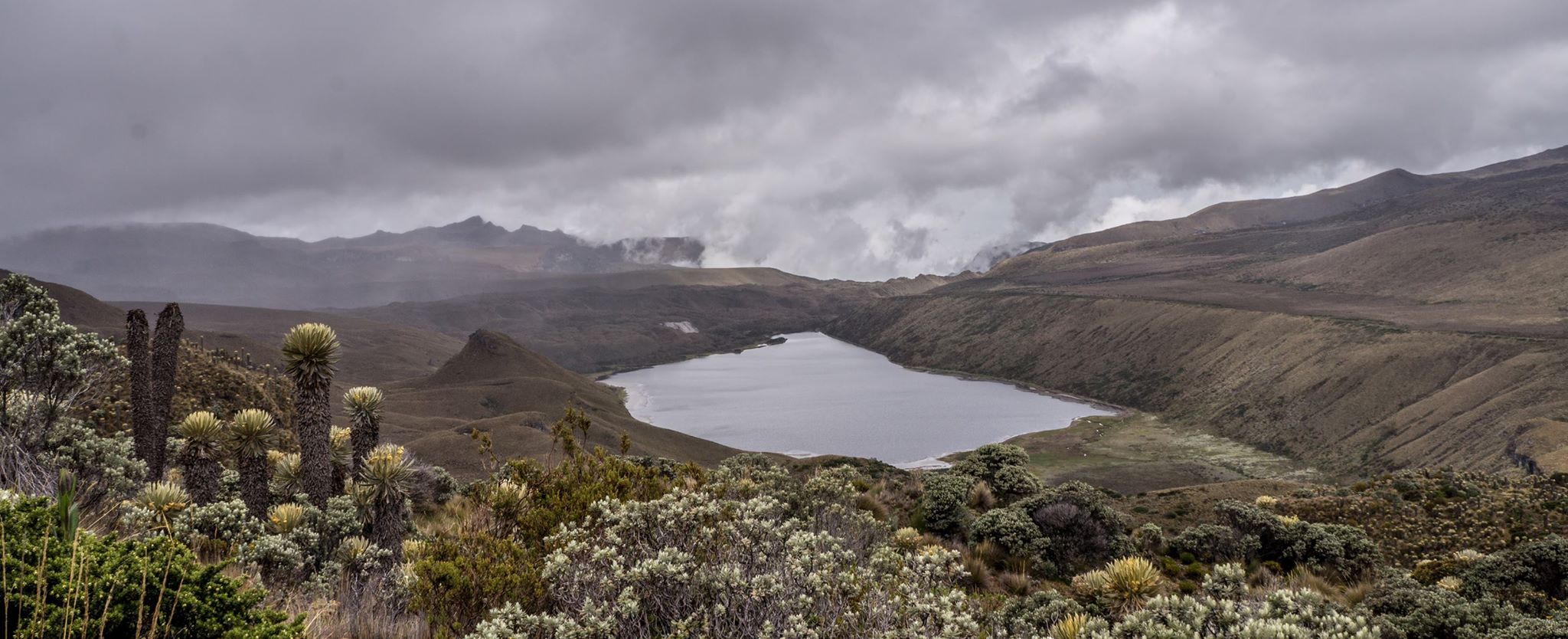
