= Nevado del Ruiz =

Volcanic mountain in Colombia

- La Mesa de Herveo
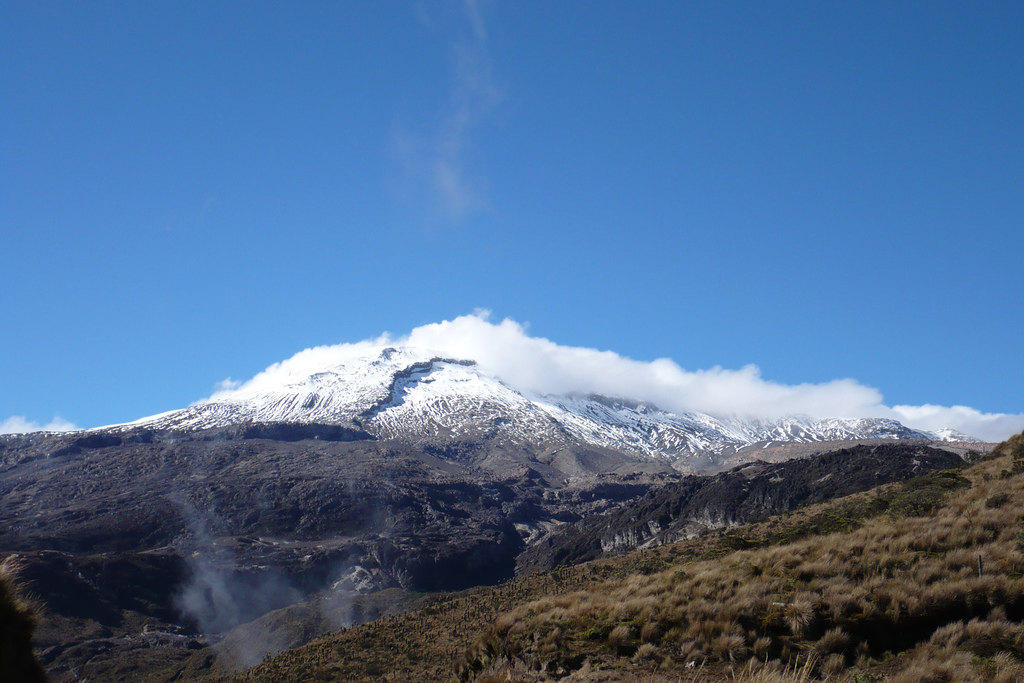
- Steam on the mountain in July 2007

Highest point
- Elevation: 5,389 m (17,680 ft)
- Prominence: 2,035 m (6,677 ft)
- Listing: Ultra
- Coordinates: 04°53′33″N 75°19′24″W

Geography
- Location within Colombia
- Location: Caldas and Tolima, Colombia
- Parent range: Central Ranges, Andes

Geology
- Rock age: Pleistocene–Holocene
- Mountain type: Stratovolcano
- Volcanic zone: Northern Volcanic Zone
- Volcanic belt: Andean Volcanic Belt
- Last eruption: 2022

Climbing
- First ascent: 1936 by Cunet and Gansser

Nevado del Ruiz (Spanish pronunciation: [neˈβaðo ðel ˈrwis]), also known as La Mesa de Herveo (English: Mesa of Herveo, the name of the nearby town) is a volcano on the border of the departments of Caldas and Tolima in Colombia, being the highest point of both. It is located about 130 km (81 mi) west of the capital city Bogotá. It is a stratovolcano composed of many layers of lava alternating with hardened volcanic ash and other pyroclastic rocks. Volcanic activity at Nevado del Ruiz began about two million years ago, during the Early Pleistocene or Late Pliocene, with three major eruptive periods. The current volcanic cone formed during the present eruptive period, which began 150,000 years ago.

The volcano usually generates Vulcanian to Plinian eruptions, which produce swift-moving currents of hot gas and rock called pyroclastic flows. These eruptions often cause massive lahars (mud and debris flows), which pose a threat to human life and the environment. The impact of such an eruption is increased as the hot gas and lava melt the mountain's snowcap, adding large quantities of water to the flow. On November 13, 1985, a small eruption produced an enormous lahar that buried and destroyed the town of Armero in Tolima, causing an estimated 25,000 deaths. This event later became known as the Armero tragedy—the deadliest lahar in recorded history. Similar but less deadly incidents occurred in 1595 and 1845, consisting of a small explosive eruption followed by a large lahar.

The volcano is part of Los Nevados National Natural Park, which also contains several other volcanoes. The summit of Nevado del Ruiz is covered by large glaciers. The volcano continues to pose a threat to the nearby towns and villages, and it is estimated that up to 500,000 people could be at risk from lahars from future eruptions. Today, the Nevado del Ruiz volcano is constantly monitored by the Colombian Geological Survey via the Volcanic and Seismic Observatory of Manizales.

== Geography and geology ==
Nevado del Ruiz, which lies about 129 km (80 mi) west of Bogotá, is part of the Andes mountain range. The volcano is part of the Ruiz–Tolima volcanic massif (or Cordillera Central), a group of five ice-capped volcanoes which also includes the Tolima, Santa Isabel, Quindio and Machin volcanoes. The massif is located at the intersection of four faults, some of which are still active.

Nevado del Ruiz lies within the Pacific Ring of Fire, a region that encircles the Pacific Ocean and contains some of the world's most active volcanoes. It is the third most northernly of the volcanoes lying in the North Volcanic Zone of the Andean Volcanic Belt, which contains 75 of the 204 Holocene-age volcanoes in South America. The Andean Volcanic Belt is produced by the eastward subduction of the oceanic Nazca Plate beneath the South American continental plate. As is the case for many subduction-zone volcanoes, Nevado del Ruiz can generate explosive Plinian eruptions with associated pyroclastic flows that can melt snow and glaciers near the summit, producing large and sometimes devastating lahars (mud and debris flows).

Like many other Andean volcanoes, Nevado del Ruiz is a stratovolcano: a voluminous, roughly conical volcano consisting of many strata of hardened lava and tephra including volcanic ash. Its lavas are andesitic–dacitic in composition. The modern volcanic cone comprises five lava domes, all constructed within the caldera of an ancestral Ruiz volcano: Nevado El Cisne, Alto de la Laguna, La Olleta, Alto la Pirana, and Alto de Santano. It covers an area of more than 200 km^{2} (77 mi^{2}), stretching 65 km (40 mi) from east to west. The mountain's broad summit includes the Arenas crater, which is 1 km (0.62 mi) in diameter and 240 m (790 ft) deep. Nevado del Ruiz, as its neighbours to the southwest Nevado El Cisne and Nevado de Santa Isabel is located over the Palestina Fault that crosscuts the underlying El Bosque Batholith, dated at 49.1 ± 1.7 Ma.

The summit of the volcano has steep slopes inclining from 20 to 30 degrees. At lower elevations, the slopes become less steep; their inclination is about 10 degrees. From there on, foothills stretch almost to the edge of the Magdalena River, north of the volcano and the Cauca River to the west. On the two major sides of the summit, headwalls show where past rock avalanches occurred. At times, ice on the summit has melted, generating devastating lahars, including the continent's deadliest eruption in 1985. On the volcano's southwest flank is the pyroclastic cone La Olleta, which is not currently active, but may have erupted in historical times.

=== Glaciers ===
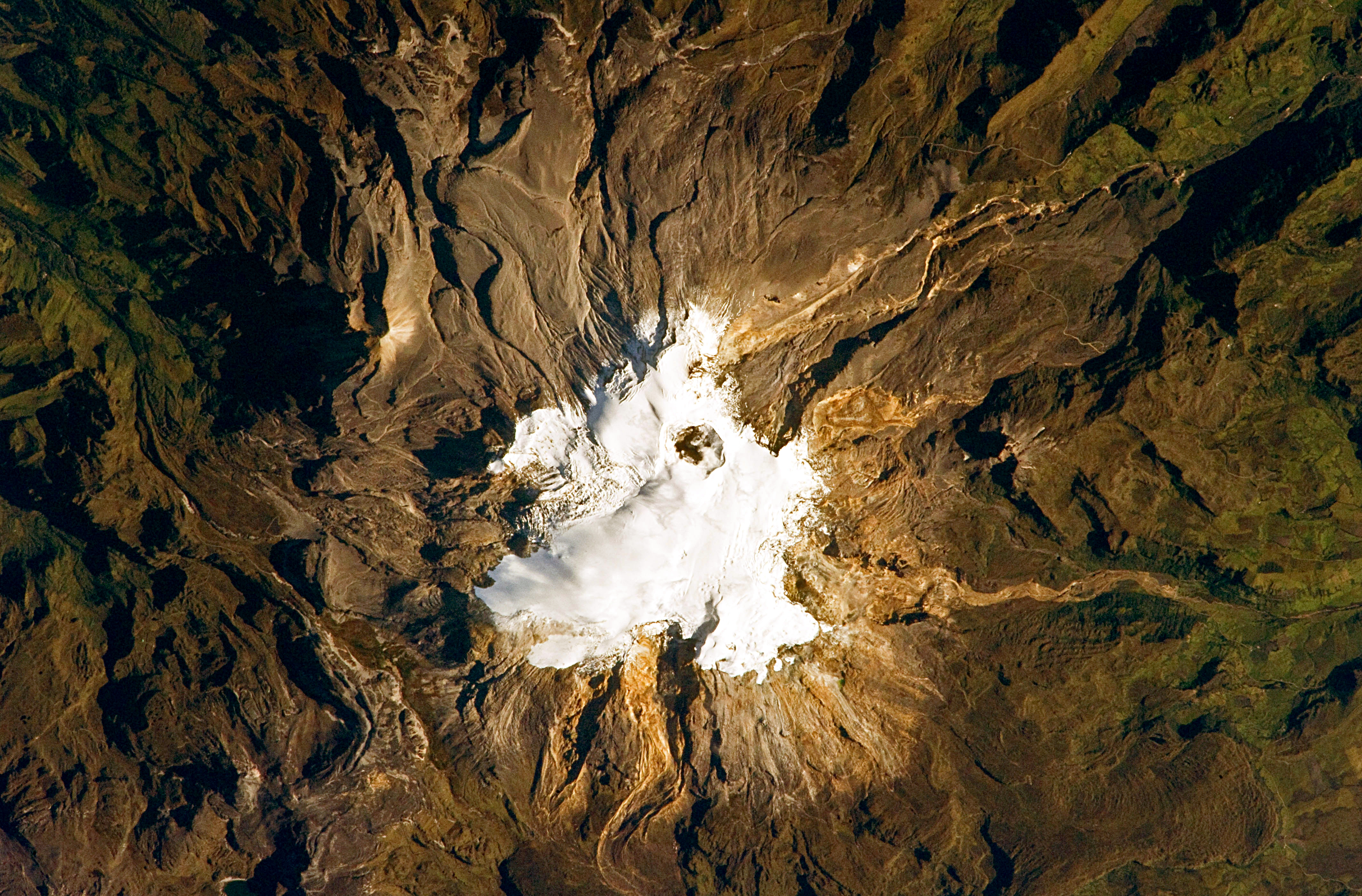
The volcano's summit and upper flanks are covered by several glaciers that appear as a white mass surrounding the Arenas crater.

The summit of Nevado del Ruiz is covered by glaciers (nevado means "snow-covered" in Spanish), which formed over many thousands of years, and have generally retreated since the Last Glacial Maximum. From 28,000 to 21,000 years ago, glaciers occupied about 1,500 km^{2} (600 mi^{2}) of the Ruiz–Tolima massif. As late as 12,000 years ago, when the ice sheets from the last glacial period were retreating, they still covered 800 km^{2} (300 mi^{2}). During the Little Ice Age, which lasted from about 1600 to 1900 CE, the ice cap covered approximately 100 km^{2} (40 mi^{2}).

Since then the glaciers have retreated further because of atmospheric warming. By 1959, the massif's glaciated area had dropped to 34 km^{2} (13 mi^{2}). Since the 1985 eruption, which destroyed about 10% of the summit ice cover, the area of Nevado del Ruiz covered by glaciers has halved—from 17 to 21 km^{2} (6.6 to 8.1 mi^{2}) just after the eruption to about 10 km^{2} (3.9 mi^{2}) in 2003. The glaciers reached altitudes as low as 4,500 m (14,800 ft) in 1985 but have now retreated to elevations of 4,800–4,900 m (15,700–16,100 ft).

The ice cap is approximately 50 m (160 ft) thick on average. It is thickest in parts of the summit plateau and under the Nereides Glacier on the southwestern slopes, where it is as deep as 190 m (620 ft). Glaciers on the northern and, to a lesser extent, the eastern slopes lost the most ice in the 1985 eruption, and therefore reach only up to 30 m (100 ft) deep. The deep ice covering the summit plateau may hide a caldera. Five domes ringing the summit plateau have emerged as the ice has retreated.

The meltwater from the glaciers drains primarily to the Cauca River and Magdalena River via the western and eastern flanks of the volcano, respectively. Runoff from these glaciers and those on the surrounding volcanoes is a source of fresh water for forty surrounding towns, and Colombian scientists and government officials are concerned about the towns' water supply should the glaciers melt completely.

== Flora and fauna ==
Nevado del Ruiz is generally poorly forested because of its high elevation, and its forest cover decreases with increasing elevation. At lower elevations, well-developed mesic forests (20–35 meters; 66–115 ft high) are present. Above these but below the tree line, parts of the volcano are covered with dwarf forests 3–8 m (10–30 ft) high. Above the tree line, in the Páramo zone, the vegetation is dominated by plants such as bunchgrass and Espeletia. Regional vegetation consists of different families of woody plants, including Rubiaceae, Leguminosae, Melastomataceae, Lauraceae, and Moraceae. Flowers such as Polypodiaceae s.l., Araceae, Poaceae, Asteraceae, Piperaceae, and Orchidaceae are also present in the region.

Animals living on the volcano include the mountain tapir and spectacled bear, both of which are designated as threatened. Other animals inhabiting the surrounding region include the rufous-fronted parakeet, buffy helmetcrest, and Herveo plump toad. The volcano is home to 27 species of birds endemic to Colombia, with 14 of these species confined to the region around the volcano. 15 bird species in the area are considered threatened.

== Los Nevados National Park ==
Nevado del Ruiz is one of several stratovolcanoes within Los Nevados National Natural Park, a national park located west of Bogotá in the centre of the Colombian Andes. The park is a popular tourist destination and contains several tourist shelters. The slopes of the volcano are used for winter sports, and nearby Lake Otún offers trout fishing. A number of commercially operated spas can be found nearby. In 1868–1869, German geologists Wilhelm Reiss and Alphons Stübel were the first to attempt to climb Ruiz. In 1936, W. Cunet and Augusto Gansser-Biaggi made the first successful ascent, partly by ski; they repeated the ascent in 1939.

== Eruptive history ==
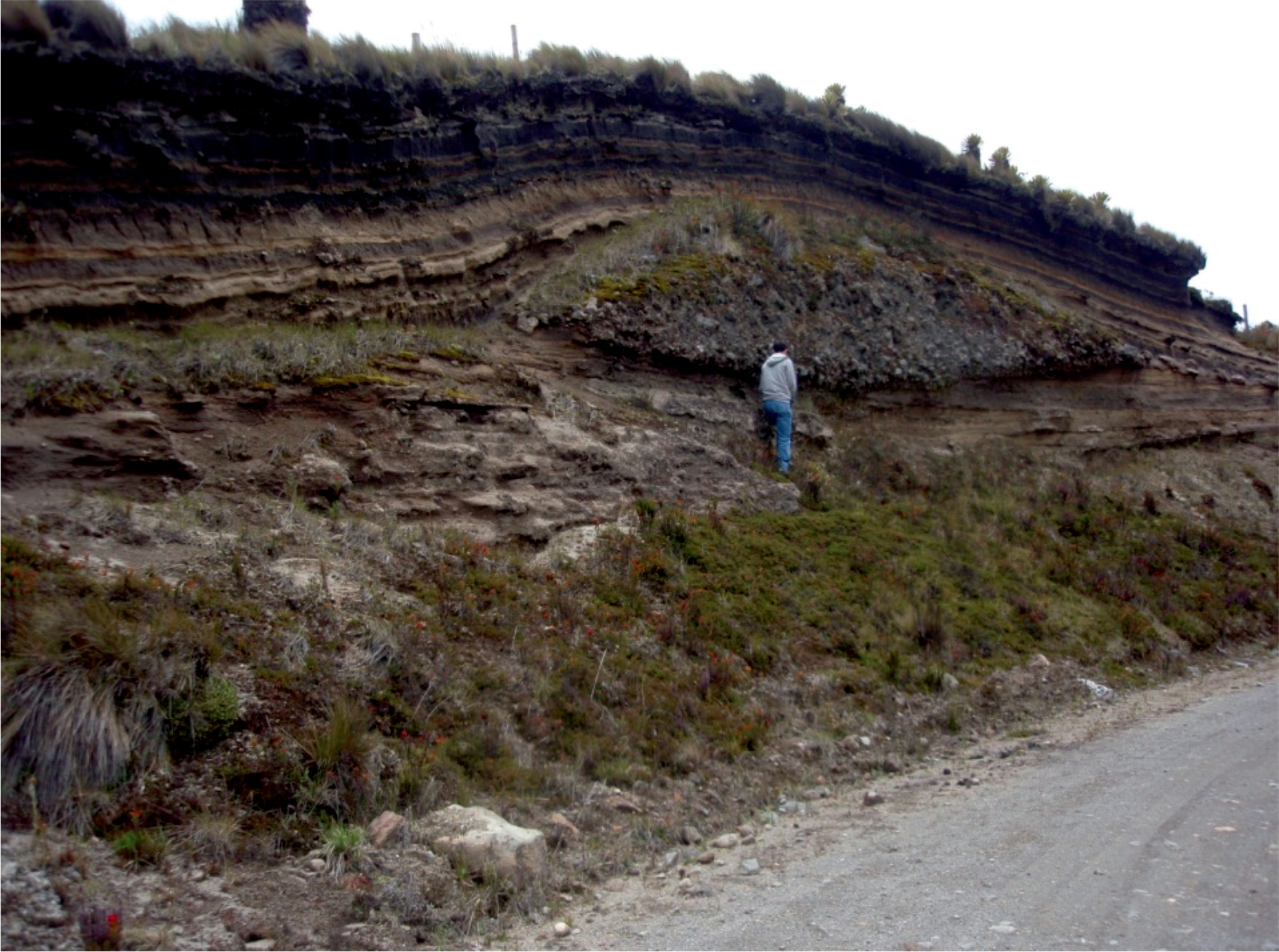
The top of the 11,000 year-old ash fall deposits interstratified with paleosols overlying a channelized debris flow and a sequence of wet surges.

The first eruptions of Nevado del Ruiz occurred about 1.8 million years ago at the beginning of the Pleistocene epoch. Three primary eruption periods in the history of the massif have been identified: ancestral, older and present. During the ancestral period between one million to two million years ago, a complex of large stratovolcanoes was created. Between 1.0 million and 0.8 million years ago, they partially collapsed, forming large (5–10 km wide) calderas. During the older period, which lasted from 0.8 million to 0.2 million years ago, a new complex of large stratovolcanoes developed (including Older Ruiz, Tolima, Quindio, and Santa Isabel). Once again explosive summit calderas formed from 0.2 million to 0.15 million years ago.

The present period began about 150,000 years ago and involved the development of the present volcanic edifice through the emplacement of lava domes made of andesite and dacite (igneous rocks) inside older calderas. During the past 11,000 years, Nevado del Ruiz passed through at least 12 eruption stages, which included multiple slope failures (rock avalanches), pyroclastic flows and lahars leading to partial destruction of the summit domes. During the past several thousand years, eruptions of the volcanoes in the Ruiz–Tolima massif have mostly been small, and the pyroclastic flow deposits have been much less voluminous than during the Pleistocene. Since the volcano's earlier eruptions are not recorded, volcanologists have used tephrochronology to date them.

During recorded history, eruptions have consisted primarily of a central vent eruption (in the caldera) followed by an explosive eruption, then lahars. Ruiz's earliest identified Holocene eruption was about 6660 BC, and further eruptions occurred in 1245 BC ± 150 years (dated through radiocarbon dating), about 850 BC, 200 BC ± 100 years, 350 AD ± 300 years, 675 AD ± 50 years, in 1350, 1541 (perhaps), (Note: Several entries in the Smithsonian's eruptive history for Nevado del Ruiz are marked as "uncertain". An eruption may have occurred at these dates, but this has not been confirmed. They define an eruption as the arrival of volcanic products, excluding gases, at the Earth's surface.) 1570, 1595, 1623, 1805, 1826, 1828 (perhaps),^{[b]} 1829, 1831, 1833 (perhaps),^{[b]} 1845, 1916, December 1984 – March 1985, September 1985 – July 1991, and possibly in April 1994.^{[b]} Many of these eruptions involved a central vent eruption, a flank vent eruption, and a phreatic (steam) explosion. Ruiz is the second-most active volcano in Colombia after Galeras.

=== 1595 lahar ===
On November 13, 1595, Nevado del Ruiz erupted. The episode consisted of three Plinian eruptions, which were heard up to 100 km (62 mi) from the summit of the volcano. A large amount of ash was ejected, which completely darkened the surrounding area. The volcano also erupted lapilli (a form of tephra) and pumice bombs. In total, the eruption produced 0.16 km^{3} of tephra. The eruption was preceded by a large precursor earthquake three days before. The eruption caused lahars, which traveled down the valleys of the nearby Gualí and Lagunillas rivers, clogging up the water, killing fish and destroying vegetation. More than 600 people died as a result of the lahar. The 1595 eruption was the last major eruption of Nevado del Ruiz before 1985. The 1595 and 1985 eruptions were similar in many respects, including in the chemical composition of the erupted material.

=== 1845 lahar ===
On the morning of February 19, 1845, a large earthquake resulted in a substantial mudflow. This mudflow flowed down the valley of the Lagunillas River for approximately 70 km (43 mi), spilling out of the river channel and killing much of the local population. After reaching an alluvial fan, the mudflow split into two branches. The larger portion of it joined the Lagunillas River and flowed into the nearby Magdalena River, while the smaller portion was diverted by hills in front of Lagunillas Canyon, turned 90 degrees to the north until it reached the Sabandija River, and then flowed east with the Sabandija River, until it rejoined the other branch of the mudflow at the junction of the Sabandija and the Magdalena. It is estimated that 1000 people were killed in the mudflows.

=== Eruption (1985) ===
Beginning November 1984, geologists observed an increasing level of seismic activity near Nevado del Ruiz. Such volcanic tectonic seismicity is often a precursor of an upcoming eruption. Other signs of a forthcoming eruption included increased fumarole activity, deposition of sulfur on the summit of the volcano, and small phreatic eruptions. In the latter, hot magma came in contact with water, resulting in explosions as the water was almost instantly turned into steam. The most notable of these events was an ash ejection on September 11, 1985. The activity of the volcano decreased in October 1985. The most likely explanation of the events is that new magma rose into the volcanic edifice before September 1985.

An Italian volcanological mission analyzed gas samples from fumaroles along the Arenas crater floor and proved them to be a mixture of carbon dioxide and sulfur dioxide, indicating a direct release of magma into the surface environment. The mission's report, delivered on October 22, 1985, judged the risk of lahars to be very high. The report proposed various simple preparedness techniques to local authorities.

In November 1985, volcanic activity once again increased as magma neared the surface. The volcano began releasing increasing quantities of gases rich in sulfur dioxide and elementary sulfur. The water content of the fumaroles' gases decreased, and water springs in the vicinity of Nevado del Ruiz became enriched in magnesium, calcium and potassium, which were leached from the magma. The thermodynamic equilibration (stationary heat energy) temperatures, corresponding to the chemical composition of the discharged gases, were from 200 °C (400 °F) to 600 °C (1,000 °F). The extensive degassing of the magma caused pressure to build up inside the volcano, which eventually resulted in the explosive eruption.

==== Eruption and lahars ====
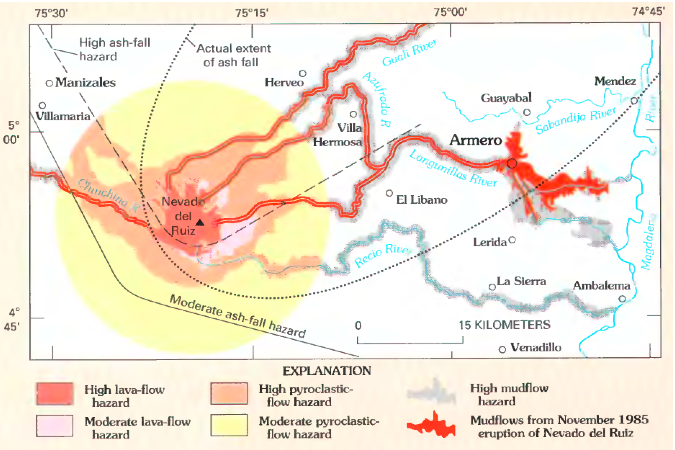
Hazard map for Nevado del Ruiz, with 1985 lahars shown in red

At 3:06 pm, on November 13, 1985, Nevado del Ruiz began to erupt, ejecting dacitic tephra more than 30 km (19 mi) into the atmosphere. The total mass of the erupted material (including magma) was 35 million tonnes—only 3% of the amount that erupted from Mount St. Helens in 1980. The eruption reached a value of 3 on the Volcanic Explosivity Index. The mass of the ejected sulfur dioxide was about 700,000 tonnes, or about 2% of the mass of the erupted solid material, making the eruption atypically sulfur-rich.

The eruption produced pyroclastic flows that melted summit glaciers and snow, generating four thick lahars that raced down river valleys on the volcano's flanks. It also destroyed a small lake that was observed in Arenas crater several months before the eruption. Water in such volcanic lakes tends to be extremely salty and contain dissolved volcanic gases. The lake's hot, acidic water significantly accelerated the melting of the ice; this effect was confirmed by the large amounts of sulfates and chlorides found in the lahar flow.

The lahars, formed of water, ice, pumice, and other rocks, mixed with clay as they travelled down the volcano's flanks. They ran down the volcano's sides at an average speed of 60 km per hour, eroding soil, dislodging rock, and destroying vegetation. After descending thousands of meters down the side of the volcano, the lahars were directed into all of the six river valleys leading from the volcano. While in the river valleys, the lahars grew to almost 4 times their original volume. In the Gualí River, a lahar reached a maximum width of 50 m (160 ft).

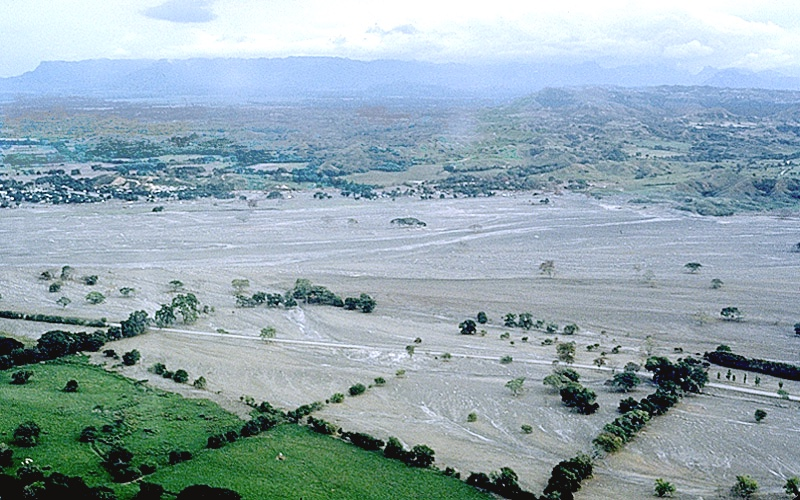
Armero was located in the center of this photograph, taken late November 1985.

One of the lahars virtually erased the town of Armero in Tolima, which lay in the Lagunilla River valley. Only one quarter of its 28,700 inhabitants survived. The second lahar, which descended through the valley of Chinchiná River, killed about 1,800 people and destroyed about 400 homes in the town of Chinchiná, in the department of Caldas. In total, over 23,000 people were killed and approximately 5,000 were injured. More than 5,000 homes were destroyed. The Armero tragedy, as the event came to be known, was the second-deadliest volcanic disaster in the 20th century, being surpassed only by the 1902 eruption of Mount Pelée, and is the fourth-deadliest volcanic eruption in recorded history. It is also the deadliest known lahar, and Colombia's worst natural disaster. A young girl named Omayra Sánchez became a worldwide symbol of the disaster after images of her trapped under the debris of her former home, after the eruption made the news worldwide.

The loss of life during the 1985 eruption was due partly to the fact that scientists did not know precisely when the eruption would occur, and the authorities would not take costly preventive measures without clear warnings of imminent danger. Because the volcano's last substantial eruption occurred more than 140 years earlier, it was also hard for many to accept the danger the volcano presented; locals even called it the "Sleeping Lion". Hazard maps showing Armero would be completely flooded after an eruption were distributed more than a month before the eruption, but the Colombian Congress criticized the scientific and civil defense agencies for scaremongering. Local authorities failed to alert people to the seriousness of the situation, with Armero's mayor and a priest both reassuring the populace after an ash eruption on the afternoon of November 13 and the consequent ashfall early that evening. Another factor was the storm that hit that evening, causing electrical outages and hindering communications. Civil defense officials from four nearby towns tried to warn Armero the lahar was approaching in the hour or so before it reached Armero, but failed to make radio contact.

Scientists later looked back to the hours before the eruption and noticed that several long-period earthquakes, which start out strong and then slowly die out, had occurred in the final hours before the eruption. Volcanologist Bernard Chouet said that, "the volcano was screaming 'I'm about to explode'", but the scientists who were studying the volcano at the time of the eruption were not able to read this signal.

In 2006, heavy rains on Ruiz sent a mudslide down the Chinchiná River, killing nine children aged 12–19 on a scouting expedition near the volcano.

== Current threats and preparedness ==
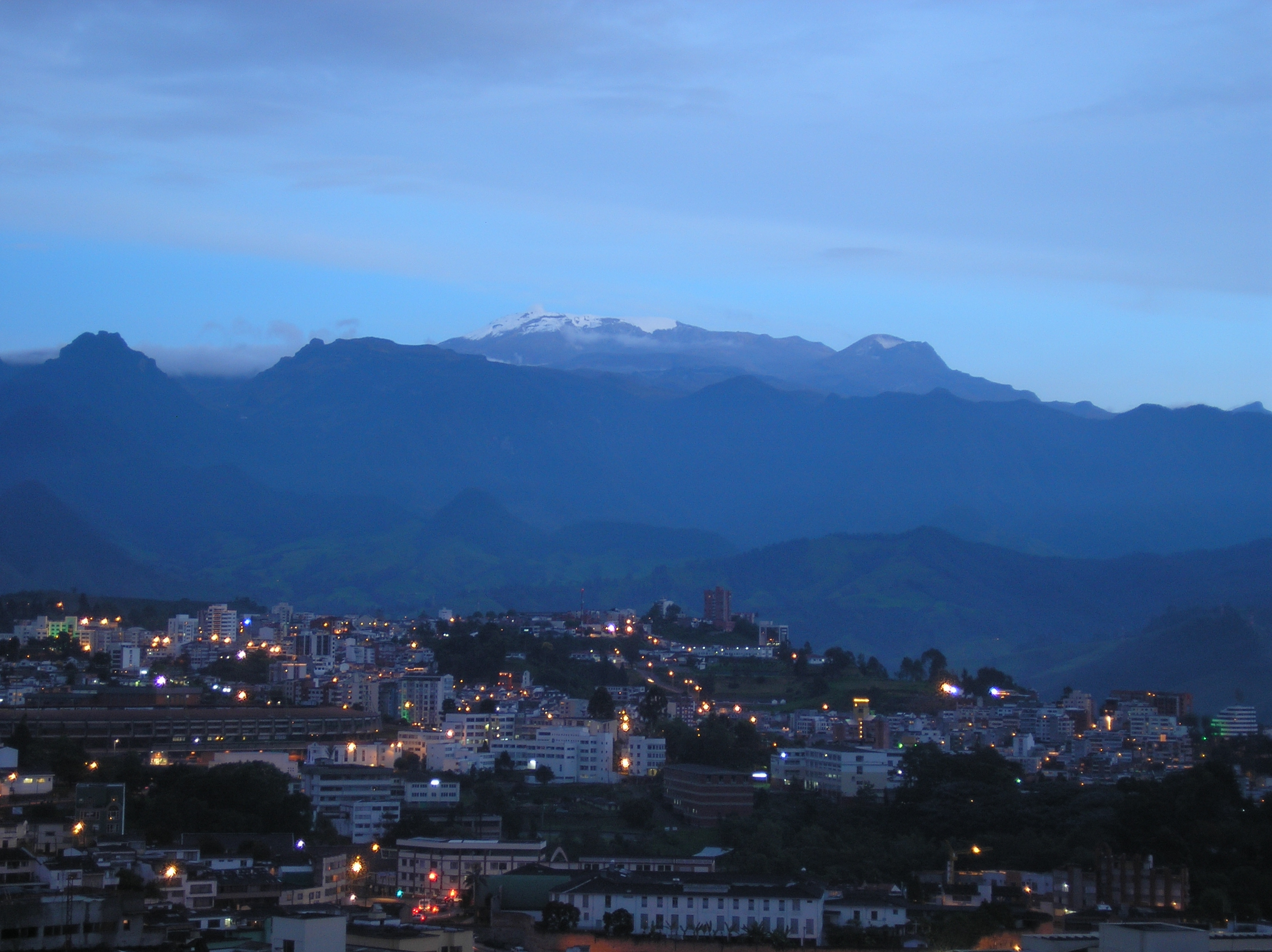
Nevado del Ruiz as seen from Manizales, 2006

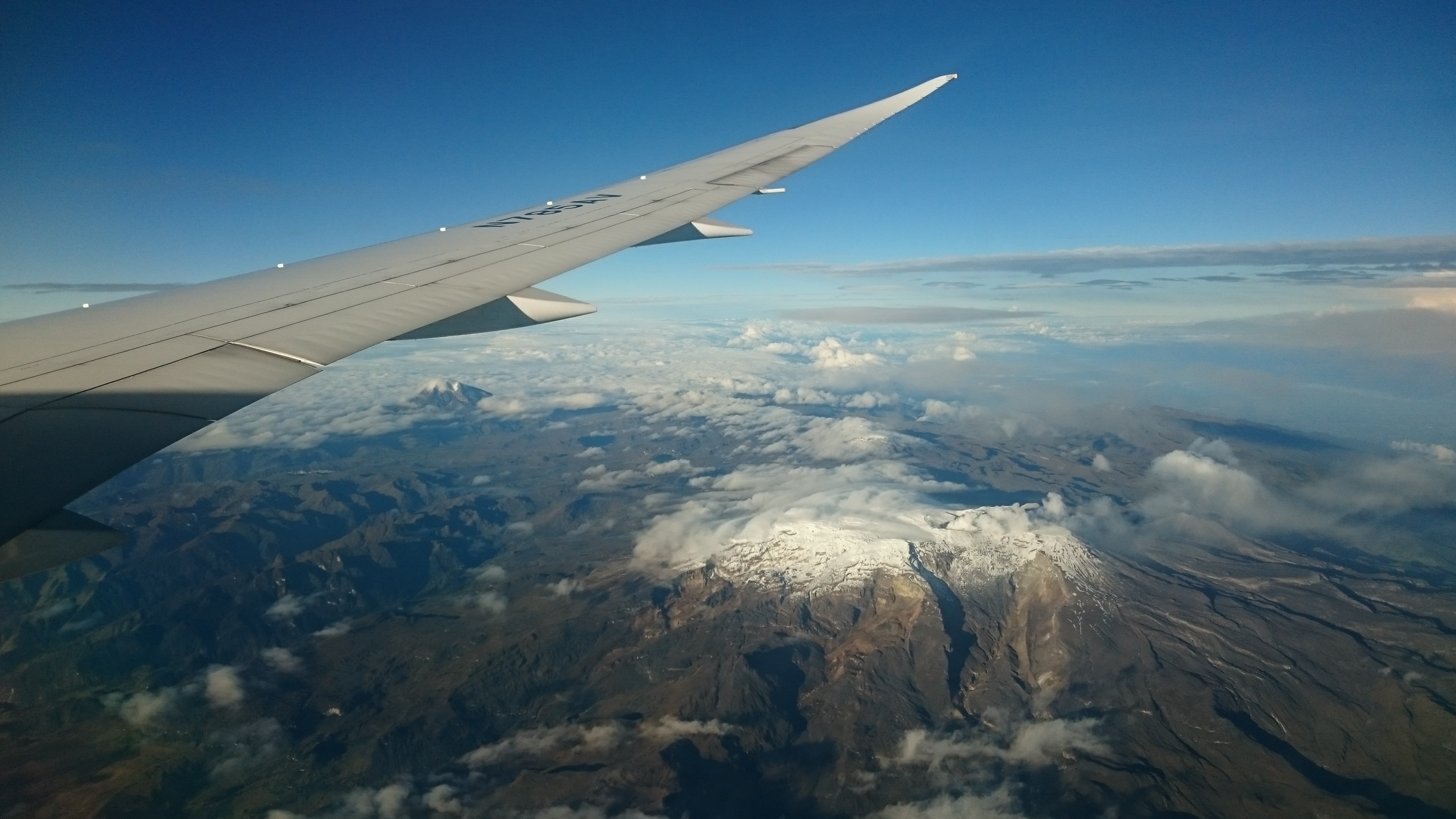
Photo of Nevado del Ruiz taken on approach to El Dorado International Airport, Bogotá. Nevado del Tolima is visible in the background on the left. Approximate altitude of photo: 7,180 m (23,550 ft).

The volcano continues to pose a serious threat to nearby towns and villages. The most likely hazard is small-volume eruptions, which might destabilize glaciers and trigger lahars. Despite the significant retrenchment of the volcano's glaciers, the volume of ice atop Nevado del Ruiz and other volcanoes in the Ruiz–Tolima massif remains large. Melting merely 10% of the ice would produce mudflows with a volume of up to 2,000,000 m^{3} (70,629,333 cu ft)—similar to the mudflow that destroyed Armero in 1985. Such lahars can travel up to 100 km (62 mi) along river valleys in a matter of few hours. Estimates show that up to 500,000 people living in the Combeima, Chinchiná, Coello-Toche, and Guali valleys are in danger, and 100,000 of these are considered to be at high risk. (Note: The available sources do not indicate that lahars from Nevado del Ruiz pose any danger to Bogotá.) Lahars pose a threat to nearby towns of Honda, Mariquita, Ambalema, Chinchiná, Herveo, Villa Hermosa, Salgar and La Dorada. Although small eruptions are more likely, the two-million-year eruptive history of the Ruiz–Tolima massif includes numerous large eruptions, indicating that the threat of a large eruption cannot be ignored. A large eruption would have more widespread effects, including the potential closure of Bogotá's airport due to ashfall.

As the Armero tragedy was exacerbated by the lack of early warnings, unwise land use, and the unpreparedness of nearby communities, the government of Colombia created a special program (Oficina Nacional para la Atencion de Desastres, 1987) to prevent such incidents in the future. All Colombian cities were directed to promote prevention planning in order to mitigate the consequences of natural disasters, and evacuations due to volcanic hazards have been carried out. About 2,300 people living along five nearby rivers were evacuated when Nevado del Ruiz erupted again in 1989. When another Colombian volcano, the Nevado del Huila, erupted in April 2008, thousands of people were evacuated because volcanologists worried that the eruption could be another "Nevado del Ruiz". In October 2022, the International Union of Geological Sciences (IUGS) listed Nevado del Ruiz as one of 100 "geological heritage sites" for being among the "best-studied volcanoes in the world" and a "model for volcanic risk management".

=== Recent activity ===
During September and October 2010, the Colombian Geological Survey noted gradual increases in seismic activity near the Arenas crater. Sulfurous odors and phreatic eruptions reported at Nevado del Ruiz prompted an alert level of Yellow on October 1. (Note: An alert level of Yellow indicates "that activity is not imminently dangerous"; it was altered based on "changes in the behavior of volcanic activity".) Chemical analysis of the volcano demonstrated deformative changes and geochemical alterations. Over the next four months a smattering of long-period earthquakes, considered pseudo-Tornillo events, raised worries that the volcano might erupt. In 2010, tilt increased, and on average 890 volcanic tremors were recorded monthly, roughly eight times as many as had been recorded from 2009 to 2010.

Scientists flying over the volcano on March 8, 2012, noted fresh ash deposits on the east flank of the volcano near the crater, likely from an phreatic eruption on February 22. Later that day, a small ash plume erupted from the crater; by March 13, scientists detected ash deposits at the head of the Gualí River. After seismicity continued to increase, the alert level was raised to Orange, and in April Nevados National Natural Park authority closed the reserve, fearing lahars and ashfall hazards. The sudden activity peak in March did not culminate in a major eruption, and activity declined enough that the alert level was lowered to Yellow on May 3. (Note: The alert level was lowered based on "changes in the behavior of volcanic activity".) On May 29, seismicity rapidly increased, and the alert level was restored to Orange because ash fell into more than 20 nearby communities. Over the next few months ash fell frequently until earthquakes increased again in June. Because of the severity of these tremors, evacuations were ordered by the Emergency Committee of Caldas on news media for 300–1500 people near the volcano. The alert level was raised to Red, indicating an imminent major volcanic event, and an eruption 7.5 km (4.7 mi) in diameter took place on July 2, 2012, continuing intermittently until the end of August. Ash plumes and sulfur dioxide emissions recurred until January 2013.

Through the beginning of July 2013, ashfall took place at Nevado del Ruiz a few times per month. On July 11, 2013, there was a relatively large explosion, followed by inactivity until August, when emission of ash resumed, continuing intermittently until April 2014. Reports of ashfall stopped until October 2014. In November 2014, earthquakes were recorded, and volcanic ash was observed near the summit; ashfall reached local communities within a 19 mi (30 km) radius of Nevado del Ruiz multiple times each month until December 2015. A lava dome was extruded from August to the end of October in 2015, coinciding with thermal anomalies increasing near the summit crater at the end of the same year. According to the Global Volcanism Program, the last documented eruption at Nevado del Ruiz took place in 2017. However, reports from the Servicio Geológico Colombiano observatory at Manizales through the end of October 2018 suggested earthquakes near the volcano, with phreatic eruptions ejecting water vapor, volcanic ash, and volcanic gases up to 0.93 mi (1.5 km) over its crater. In March 2023, seismic activity around the volcano dramatically increased, prompting the Colombian Geological Survey to raise the alert level from yellow to orange. Families living in the area near the volcano were evacuated, and local schools transitioned to online classes; Los Nevados Natural Park was closed. Ultimately, in June 2023, the threat level was lowered back to yellow without an eruption.

== See also ==
- List of volcanic eruptions by death toll
- List of volcanoes in Colombia
- List of mountains in Colombia
- List of volcanoes by elevation
- 22195 Nevadodelruiz, a minor planet named after the volcano
