= Nevado El Cisne =

Mountain in Colombia

- Location within Colombia

Highest point
- Elevation: 4,700 m (15,400 ft)
- Parent peak: Nevado del Ruiz
- Listing: Los Nevados National Natural Park
- Coordinates: 4°50′35″N 75°21′08″W

Geography
- Location: Caldas & Tolima, Colombia
- Parent range: Central Ranges; Andes

Geology
- Mountain type: Basaltic lava dome
- Volcanic belt: North Volcanic Zone; Andean Volcanic Belt

The Nevado El Cisne or Nevado del Cisne (English: The Snowy Swan), also known as Paramillo el Cisne or Paramillo del Cisne (English: The Little Paramo-like Swan), is a volcano in the Central Ranges of the Andes in Colombia. Its summit is at an altitude of approximately 4,700 metres (15,400 ft).

The mountain belongs to the Cisne-Morro Negro lava dome, a small volcanic complex near Nevado del Ruiz.

Despite the nevado part of the name, indicating a permanently snow-capped mountain, the summit of El Cisne is now below the permanent snow line as a result of global warming, and it is no longer considered a true nevado. Hence it is now commonly referred to as a paramillo.

== Geology ==
Nevado El Cisne is the summit of a small volcanic complex which includes El Cisne's sister peak, Morro Negro, and several subpeaks. They are small stratovolcanoes. The complex has well-preserved morphology with barely eroded lava flows, suggesting recent volcanic activity.

Five emission centers have been identified as generators of lava flows. The lava flows are andesitic and present notably smaller volumes compared to those observed in neighbouring volcanic complexes (Ruiz and Santa Isabel).

The volcano is located over the Palestina Fault, that crosscuts the underlying El Bosque Batholith of Eocene age, dated at 49.1 ± 1.7 Ma.

== See also ==
- List of volcanoes in Colombia
- List of volcanoes by elevation
- List of mountains in Colombia
