= Serranía de las Minas =

- Location within Colombia

Highest point
- Elevation: 2,700 m (8,900 ft)
- Coordinates: 2°09′36″N 76°10′055″W

Dimensions
- Area: 156 km^{2} (60 mi^{2})

Geography
- Country: Colombia
- Region: Huila

The Serranía de las Minas is a mountainous region in the Central Andes near Puracé National Natural Park in the Department of Huila of Colombia. This area gives rise to the waters of the Magdalena River. It is a proposed Flora and Fauna Sanctuary for the existence of primary montane forest and habitat for many important species of amphibians, mammals, and birds.

== Geography ==
The mountains are located within the municipalities of Tarqui, La Plata, La Argentina, El Pital, and Oporapa and encompasses an area of approximately 156 square kilometres (60 sq mi). The highest mountain peaks reach up to 2,700 metres (8,900 ft).
