= Nevado del Quindío =

Inactive volcano in the Central Cordillera of the Andes in central Colombia

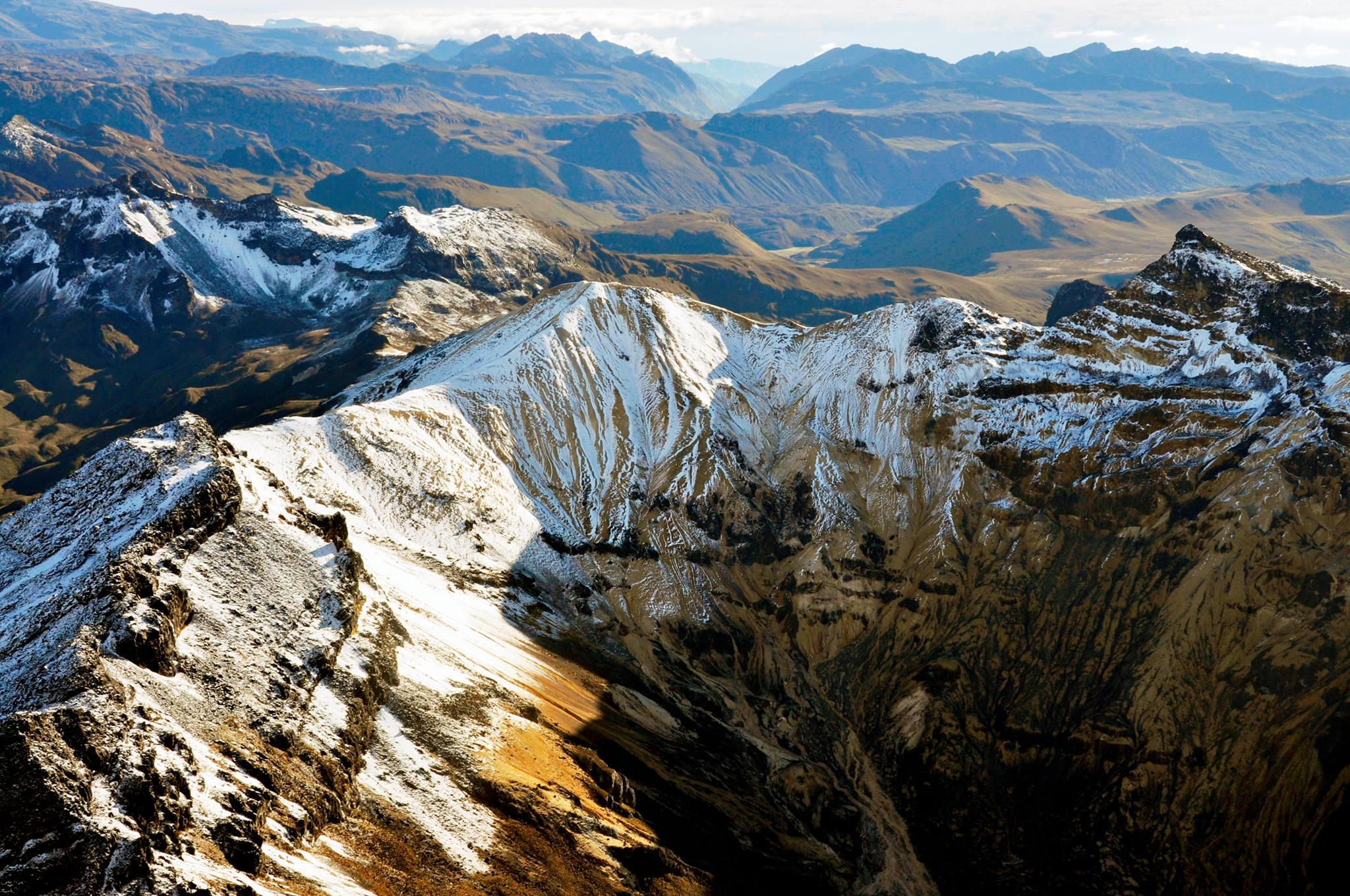
- As snow diminishes, the mountain is increasingly referred to as Paramillo del Quindío

Highest point
- Elevation: 4,760 m (15,620 ft)
- Listing: Los Nevados National Natural Park
- Coordinates: 4°42′56″N 75°23′18″W

Geography
- Location within Colombia
- Location: Risaralda, Quindío & Tolima, Colombia
- Parent range: Central Ranges; Andes

Geology
- Mountain type: Andesitic stratovolcano
- Volcanic zone: North Volcanic Zone
- Volcanic belt: Andean Volcanic Belt
- Last eruption: Pleistocene

Climbing
- Easiest route: Cocora valley, Quindío

The Nevado del Quindío, also known as Volcán Paramillo del Quindío or simply Paramillo del Quindío, is an inactive volcano located in the Central Cordillera of the Andes in central Colombia. The summit marks the tripoint of the departments of Risaralda, Tolima, and Quindío, and is the highest point of the latter. The mountain is the fourth highest peak in Los Nevados National Natural Park among those with a topographic prominence exceeding 300 meters. There are no historical records of any eruption. The andesitic volcano is located on top of the Palestina Fault.

The mountain formerly had glaciers, which disappeared in the second half of the 20th century due to changing climatic conditions associated with global warming. Presently there is no permanent ice, only intermittent snow. The mountain's alternative designation as "paramillo" (like paramo, a high-elevation area of sparse vegetation exposed to wind, rain, and cold) reflects this new reality, whereas the term "nevado" inaccurately implies continuous snow cover.

The mountain area offers beautiful landscapes, attracting touristic visits all the year. The lower part is a cloud forest habitat, rich in endemic species.

Botanist and naturalist Alexander von Humboldt visited the area in 1801, describing new species such as the frailejón.

== In popular culture ==
The postal service of Colombia, Adpostal, released a postage stamp featuring the Nevado del Quindío and Von Humboldt, to celebrate the anniversary of his visit. It is a stratovolcano or composite volcano, evidenced by geological studies.

A watercolor painting of the volcano by Manuel María Paz (1820–1902) is held by the National Library of Colombia.

== Gallery ==
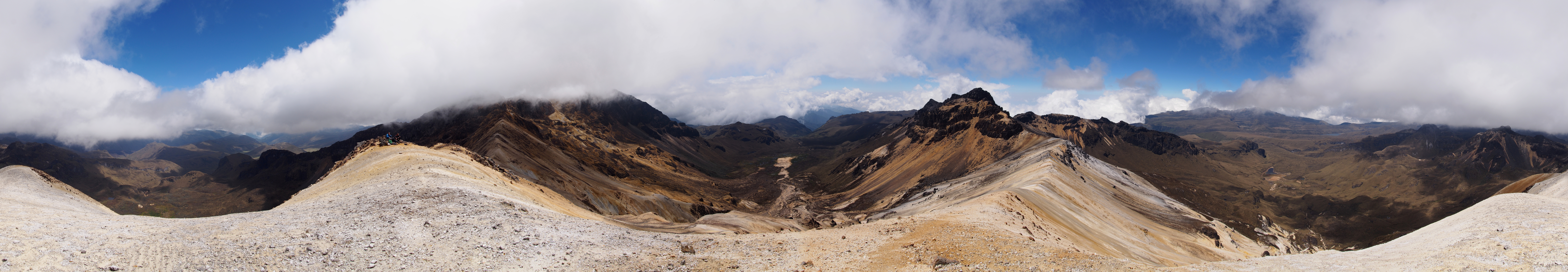
Panoramic view from the north peak of Nevado del Quindío

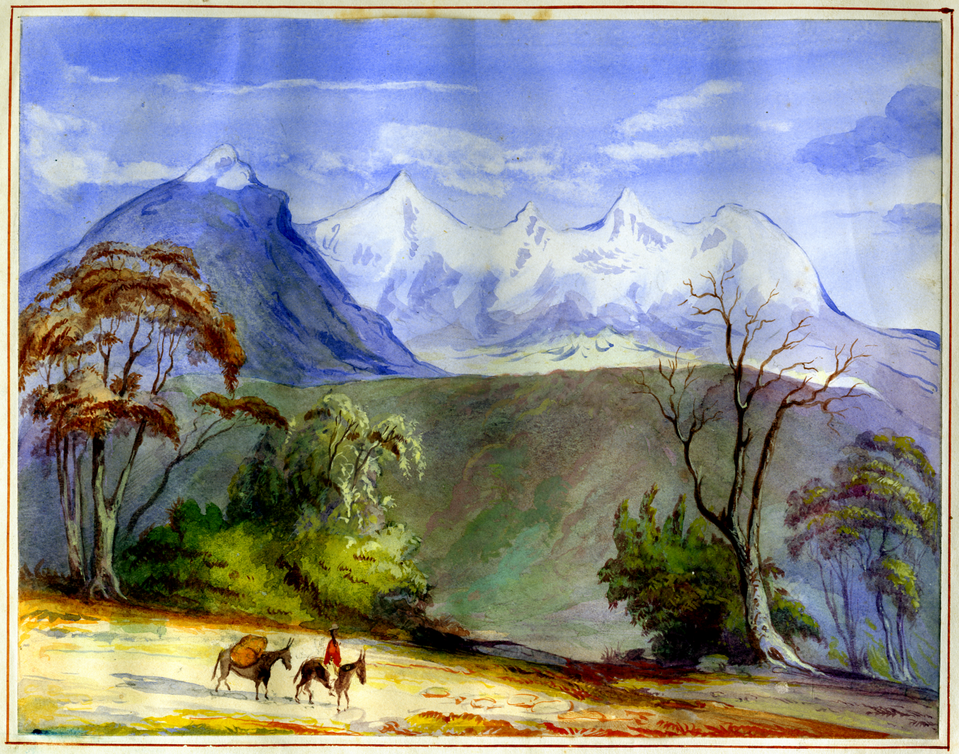
Nevado del Quindio, province of Cauca
aquarel by Manuel María Paz (1853)

== See also ==
- List of volcanoes in Colombia
- List of volcanoes by elevation
- List of mountains in Colombia
