= Villahermosa, Tolima =

Coordinates: 5°00′N 75°10′W

- Municipality and town
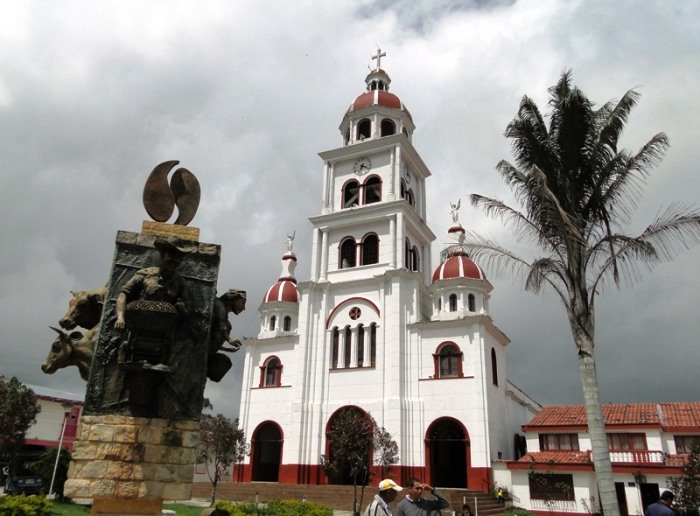

- Flag Coat of arms

- Location of the municipality and town of Villahermosa, Tolima in the Tolima Department of Colombia.
- Country: Colombia
- Department: Tolima Department

Area
  - Total: 264.7 km^{2} (102.2 sq mi)
- Elevation: 2,079 m (6,821 ft)

Population (2015)
  - Total: 10,696
  - Density: 40.41/km^{2} (104.7/sq mi)
- Time zone: UTC-5 (Colombia Standard Time)

Villahermosa is a town and municipality in the Tolima department of Colombia. The population of the municipality was 12,574 as of the 1993 census. The municipality is also one of the most important coffee producers of Tolima's north.

== Climate ==
Villahermosa has a subtropical highland climate (Cfb). It has heavy rainfall year-round.

Climate data for Villahermosa, elevation 2,029 m (6,657 ft), (1981–2010)
Month	Jan	Feb	Mar	Apr	May	Jun	Jul	Aug	Sep	Oct	Nov	Dec	Year
Mean daily maximum °C (°F)	19.7 (67.5)	19.9 (67.8)	20.1 (68.2)	20.2 (68.4)	20.4 (68.7)	20.4 (68.7)	20.3 (68.5)	20.5 (68.9)	20.4 (68.7)	20.0 (68.0)	19.9 (67.8)	19.9 (67.8)	20.1 (68.2)
Daily mean °C (°F)	16.5 (61.7)	16.6 (61.9)	16.8 (62.2)	17.1 (62.8)	17.3 (63.1)	17.1 (62.8)	16.9 (62.4)	17.0 (62.6)	17.0 (62.6)	16.7 (62.1)	16.7 (62.1)	16.6 (61.9)	16.9 (62.4)
Mean daily minimum °C (°F)	13.6 (56.5)	13.8 (56.8)	14.0 (57.2)	14.3 (57.7)	14.3 (57.7)	13.7 (56.7)	13.5 (56.3)	13.3 (55.9)	13.6 (56.5)	13.7 (56.7)	13.7 (56.7)	13.7 (56.7)	13.7 (56.7)
Average precipitation mm (inches)	161.1 (6.34)	192.2 (7.57)	242.4 (9.54)	286.0 (11.26)	292.9 (11.53)	137.2 (5.40)	108.1 (4.26)	125.9 (4.96)	232.0 (9.13)	308.2 (12.13)	270.8 (10.66)	185.0 (7.28)	2,541.7 (100.07)
Average precipitation days	16	16	20	22	21	15	13	13	17	22	21	18	212
Average relative humidity (%)	89	89	89	89	89	88	85	84	86	89	90	89	88
Mean monthly sunshine hours	133.3	107.3	114.7	108.0	133.3	165.0	186.0	186.0	153.0	127.1	105.0	127.1	1,645.8
Mean daily sunshine hours	4.3	3.8	3.7	3.6	4.3	5.5	6.0	6.0	5.1	4.1	3.5	4.1	4.5
Source: Instituto de Hidrologia Meteorologia y Estudios Ambientales
