= Cordillera Central (Colombia) =

Branch of the Colombian Andes

Cordillera Central (Central Ranges)
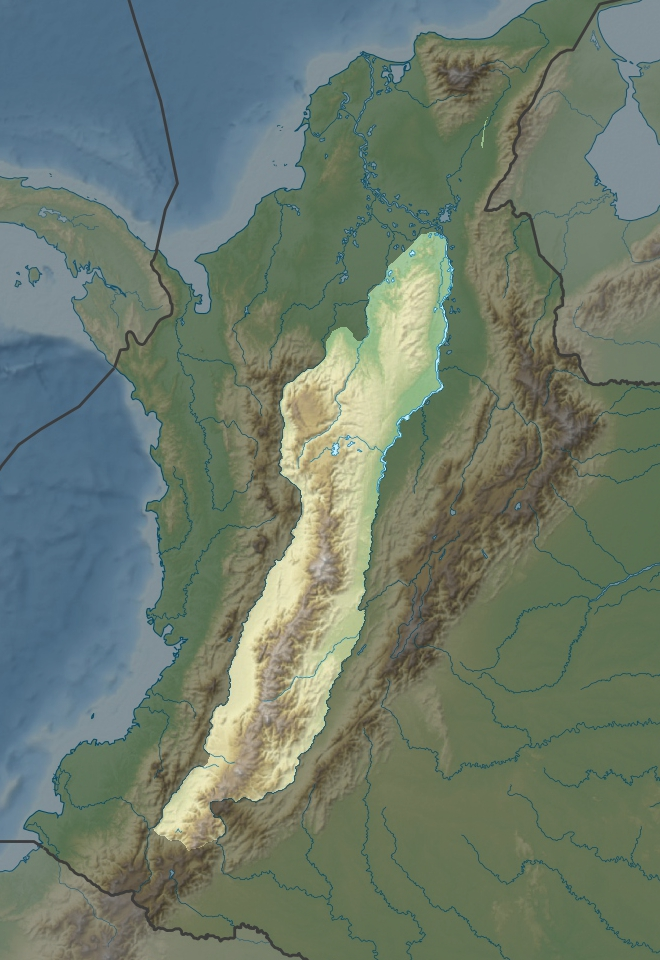

Highest point
- Peak: Nevado del Huila
- Elevation: 5,364 m (17,598 ft)

Dimensions
- Length: 1,023 km (636 mi) north-south
- Area: 129,737 km^{2} (50,092 mi^{2})

Geography
- Country: Colombia

The Cordillera Central (English: Central Ranges) is the highest of the three branches of the Colombian Andes. The range extends from south to north dividing from the Colombian Massif in Cauca Department to the Serranía de San Lucas in Bolívar Departments. The highest peak is Nevado del Huila at 5,364 m (17,598 ft).

Significant graphite resources exist in Cordillera Central in the form of graphite-bearing schists.

== Geography ==
The range is bounded by the Cauca and Magdalena river valleys to the west and east, respectively.

The Cauca Valley montane forests ecoregion covers the western slope of the range. The Magdalena Valley montane forests cover the eastern slopes and the northern end of the cordillera. The Northern Andean páramo covers the highest elevations.

=== Highest peaks ===
- Nevado del Huila – 5,364 m (17,598 ft) – Cauca, Huila & Tolima
- Nevado del Ruiz – 5,311 m (17,425 ft) – Caldas & Tolima
- Nevado del Tolima – 5,215 m (17,110 ft) – Tolima
- Nevado de Santa Isabel – 5,100 m (16,700 ft) – Risaralda, Tolima & Caldas
- Nevado del Quindio – 4,760 m (15,620 ft) – Quindio, Tolima & Risaralda
- Cerro Pan de Azucar – 4,670 m (15,320 ft) – Cauca & Huila
- Puracé – 4,646 m (15,243 ft) – Cauca & Huila

== Protected areas ==
- PNN Los Nevados
- PNN Nevado del Huila
- PNN Puracé
- PNN Las Hermosas
- PNN Selva de Florencia
- SFF Otún Quimbaya
- SFF Serranía de las Minas – proposed

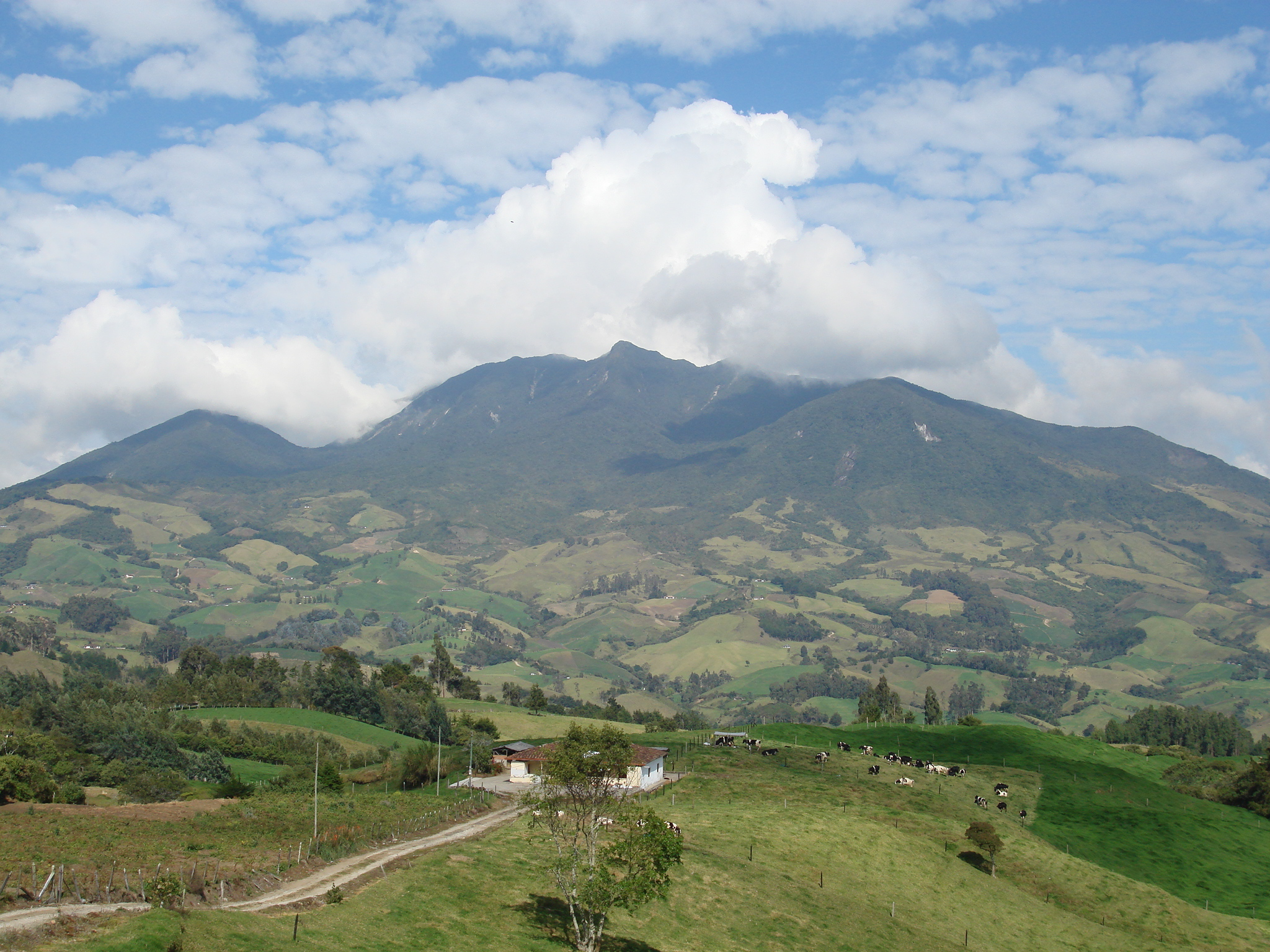
Cordillera Central, Antioquia Department

== See also ==
- Geography of Colombia
- Cordillera Occidental (Colombia)
- Cordillera Oriental (Colombia)
- List of mountains in Colombia
