= Nevado de Santa Isabel =

Shield volcano in Tolima, Colombia

- Santa Isabel Volcano
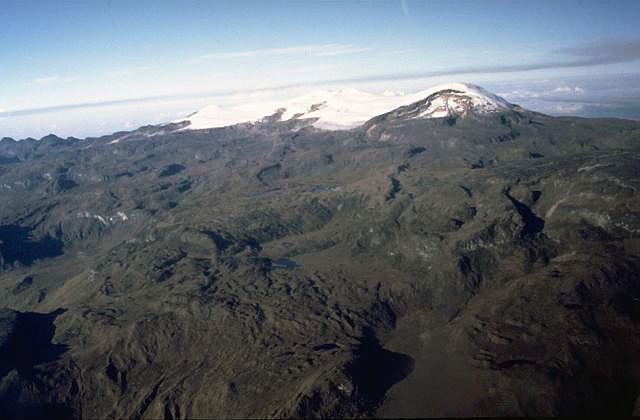
- Nevado de Santa Isabel in 1985

Highest point
- Elevation: 4,950 m (16,240 ft)
- Listing: Volcanoes of Colombia
- Coordinates: 04°49′N 75°22′W

Geography
- Location within Colombia
- Location: Tolima; Colombia
- Parent range: Central Ranges, Andes

Geology
- Mountain type: Shield volcano
- Volcanic belt: North Volcanic Zone; Andean Volcanic Belt
- Last eruption: 1943

Nevado de Santa Isabel (English: "The Snowy of Saint Isabel") is a shield volcano straddling the boundaries of the Colombian departments of Tolima, Caldas, and Risaralda, being the highest point of the latter. The volcano lies approximately 10 kilometers southwest of the larger Nevado del Ruiz volcano. Santa Isabel is the third highest peak in Los Nevados National Natural Park. It is a relatively flat volcano with three domes of nearly equal elevation.

== Geology ==
The volcano is located over the Palestina Fault, that crosscuts the underlying El Bosque Batholith of Eocene age, dated at 49.1 ± 1.7 Ma.

== Gallery ==
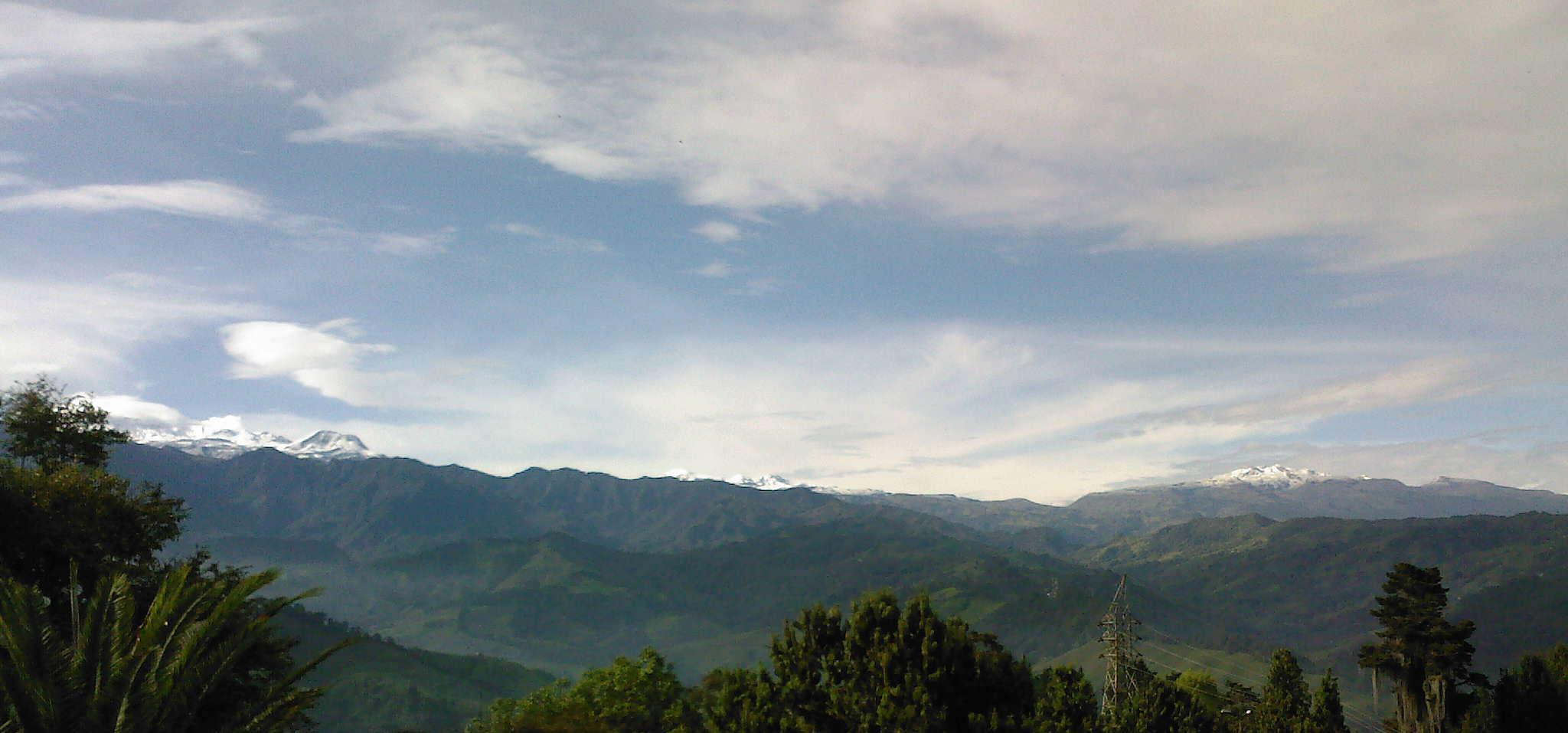
Panorama of Nevado del Ruiz (left), Nevado de Santa Isabel (centre) and Paramillo de Santa Rosa (right)

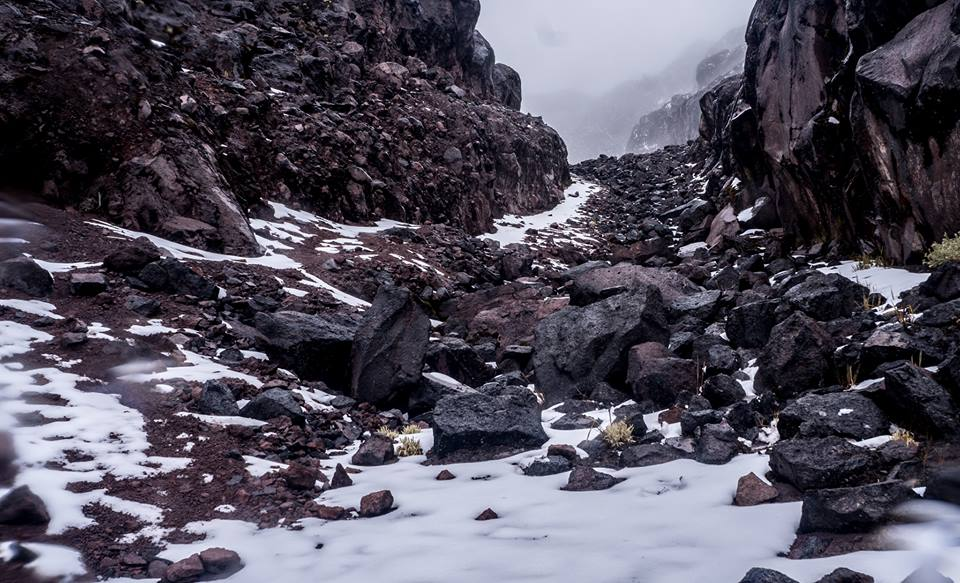
Basalt blocks of Santa Isabel volcano

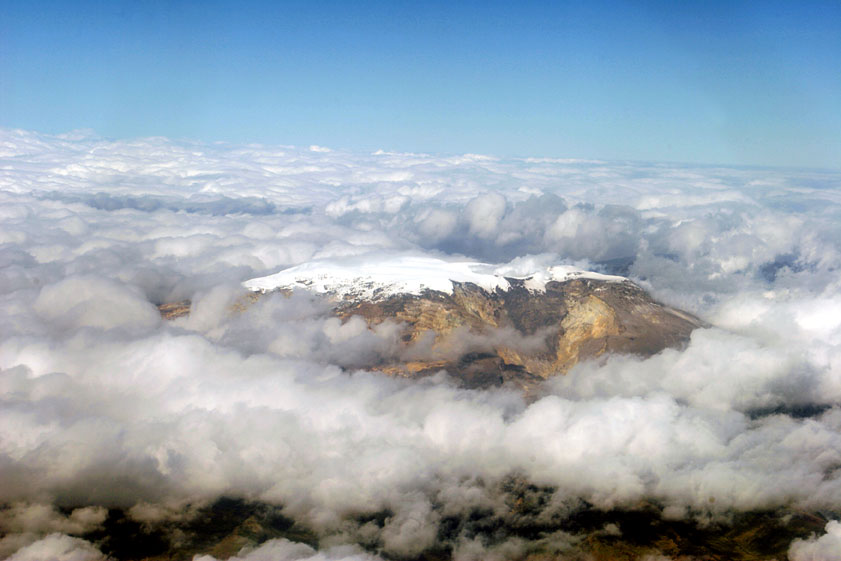
Aerial view of the summit of Nevado de Santa Isabel

== See also ==
- List of volcanoes in Colombia
- List of mountains in Colombia
- List of volcanoes by elevation
