= Megabús =

Bus system in Pereira, Colombia

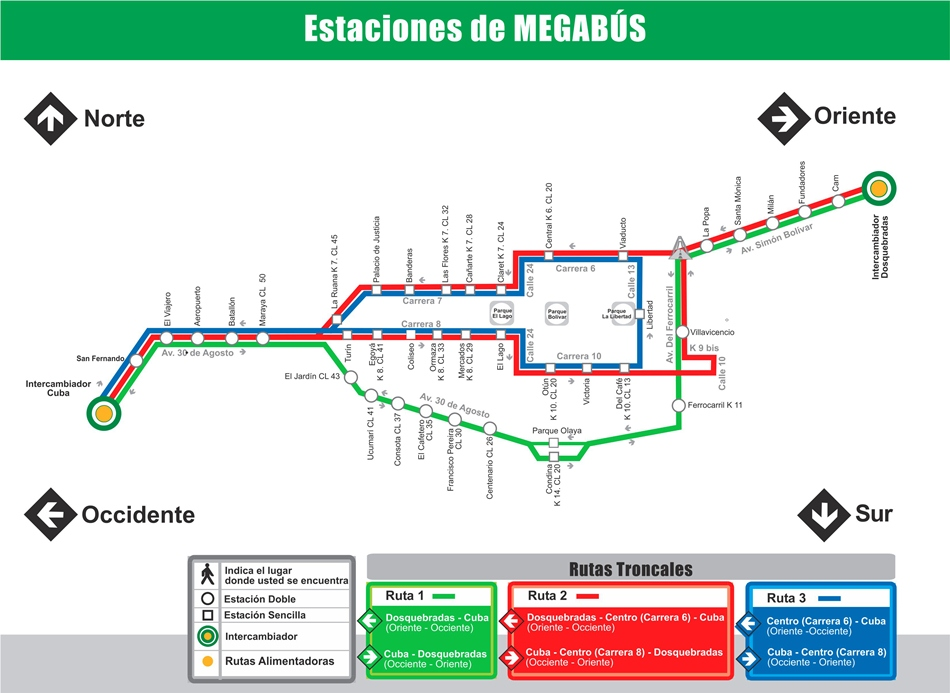
- Megabús main routes.
- Founded: August 21, 2006
- Headquarters: Cra. 10 entre calles 17 y 18; Edificio Torre Central Piso 9, Pereira, Colombia
- Service area: Pereira and Dosquebradas
- Service type: Bus rapid transit
- Routes: 3 BRT lines
- Stops: 17 (Line 1); 18 (Line 2); 25 (Line 3)
- Hubs: 2 (Dosquebradas and Cuba)
- Annual ridership: 33.5 million (2025)
- Website: Megabús

The Megabús is a bus rapid transit system that serves the cities of Pereira and Dosquebradas in Colombia. The Megabús covers most parts of the cities using Av. 30 de Agosto and Av. del Ferrocarril in Pereira, and Av. Simon Bolívar in Dosquebradas. Carrera 6ta, Carrera 7ta, Carrera 8ta, Carrera 10ma, Calle 13ra and Calle 24ta are also used. The system opened on August 21, 2006 using only Line 3. Line 1 and Line 2 were opened on October 23, 2006. The provisional Intercambiador (Transfer Station) in Dosquebradas was opened in 2007 and the final one in the Cuba neighborhood of Pereira in August 2008. It is connected with the Megacable gondola lift line in Parque Olaya station.

== Structure ==
The system is similar to TransMilenio in Bogotá. An additional set of regular buses, known as alimentadores (feeders), carries users from certain important stations to different locations that the main route does not reach. Unlike the main TransMilenio buses, feeders are not operated with dedicated lanes, are not articulated, and are yellow (regular Megabús buses are green). There is no additional fare in order to use the feeder buses.

== Stations ==
Line 1 Cuba to Dosquebradas (without entering downtown)	Line 2 Cuba to Dosquebradas (with entering downtown)	Line 3 Cuba to La Libertad and back
"Intercambiador" of Cuba; El Viajero; Aeropuerto; Batallón; Maraya; El Jardin; Ucumarí; Consota; El Cafetero; Centenario; Condina or Parque Olaya; Ferrocarril; Villavicencio; La Popa; Santa Monica; Milán; Fundadores; CAM; Provisional "Intercambiador" of Dosquebradas (up to 2010)	"Intercambiador" of Cuba; El Viajero; Aeropuerto; Batallón; Maraya; Turín; Egoyá; Coliseo; Ormaza; Mercados; El Lago; Otún; Victoria; Del Café; Villavicencio; La Popa; Santa Monica; Milán; Fundadores; CAM; Provisional "Intercambiador" of Dosquebradas (up to 2010)	"Intercambiador" of Cuba; El Viajero; Aeropuerto; Batallón; Maraya; Turín; Egoyá; Coliseo; Ormaza; Mercados; El Lago; Otún; Victoria; Del Café; La Libertad; Viaducto; Central; Claret; Cañarte; Las Flores; Banderas; Palacio de Justicia; La Ruana; Maraya; Batallón; Aeropuerto; El Viajero; "Intercambiador" of Cuba
