= César Gaviria Trujillo Viaduct =

Cable-stayed bridge

Coordinates: 4°49′3.2″N 75°41′10.2″W

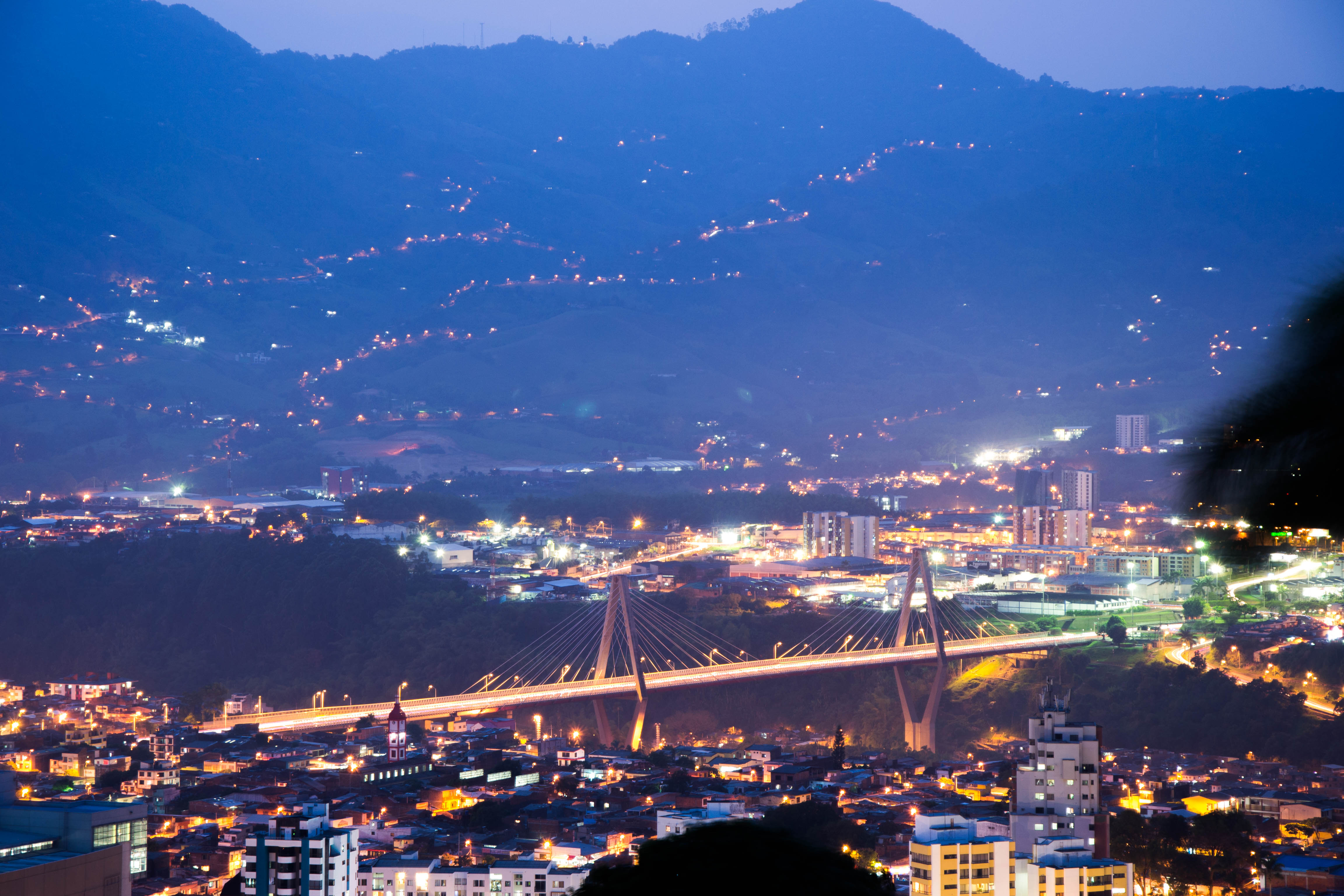
View of the bridge at night

The César Gaviria Trujillo Viaduct (Spanish: Viaducto César Gaviria Trujillo) is a cable-stayed bridge connecting the neighbouring cities of Pereira and Dosquebradas in Risaralda, Colombia. It is one of the longest cable-stayed bridges in South America and, at the time of its completion in 1997, ranked 20th in the world.

The bridge has a total length of 440 metres, including a central span of 211 metres. There are four traffic lanes and two sidewalks, giving a total width of 26 metres. There are two towers (Concrete material) that have a height of 56 metres above the deck (Steel structure), which in turn has a maximum height of 55 metres above the Otún River.

The bridge was built by a Brazilian and German consortium (Consortium of Andrade Gutierrez and Walter Bau AG), with assistance from French and Portuguese firms. The fabrication of the Steel structure was contracted to Industrias Metalurgicas Van Dam in Venezuela. Construction of the bridge took three years and was completed in 1997, at a cost of US$58 million. Twelve workers died during the construction process.

The bridge has had a significant impact on reducing traffic congestion in the two cities. It reduced the travel time between them by up to 40 minutes, avoiding the need to descend to the bottom of the river valley. It also had an important regional effect, through improved transportation links between Manizales, Armenia and Pereira.

The bridge has become infamous as a site for suicides. From the time of its completion until July 2005, 88 people ended their lives by jumping off the bridge, including people from neighbouring departments who were attracted by the high and accessible structure. Two people have survived the fall, in one case by landing in a stand of guadua growing by the river. In a particularly shocking episode in 2003, a woman threw her 2-year-old daughter off the bridge before jumping to her own death with her 7-month-old daughter. In 2008, the government of Pereira demanded the construction of some kind of barrier along the bridge's edges, and, since the barrier's construction, no one has jumped off the bridge.

The bridge is named after Pereira-born César Gaviria Trujillo, president of Colombia from 1990 to 1994.

== Name Change Campaign ==
On May 5, 2021, during the 2021 strike demonstrations, university activist Lucas Villa and two people who were gathered in a plato on the Viaduct, were hit with firearm projectiles from an unknown white car. The balance was three wounded, among which the young Villa stands out, who died after being hit by eight bullets. As a result of the events, on May 6, 2021, several citizens of Pereira, including the human rights defender Sidssy and friends of Villa, began a campaign to change the name of the work to Viaduct Lucas Villa.

== Notes ==
1. Galindez et al. (2003), page 2.
2. Bridge data from Galindez et al. (2003).
3. El Pais (2003).
4. Inter-American Development Bank (1998).
5. El Diario del Otún (2005).
6. El Pais (2003).
