= Otún River =

River in Colombia

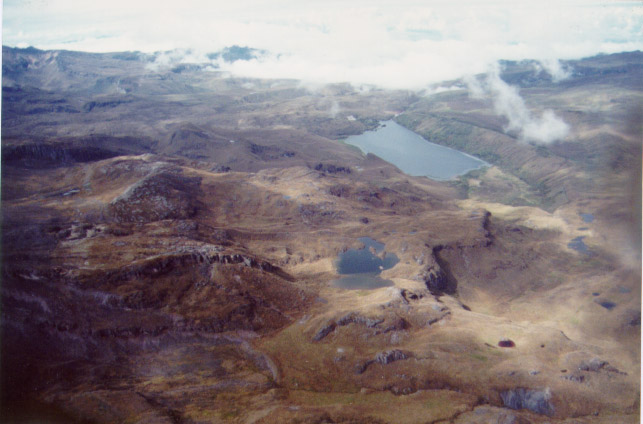
View of the Otún lagoon that gives rise to the river of the same name

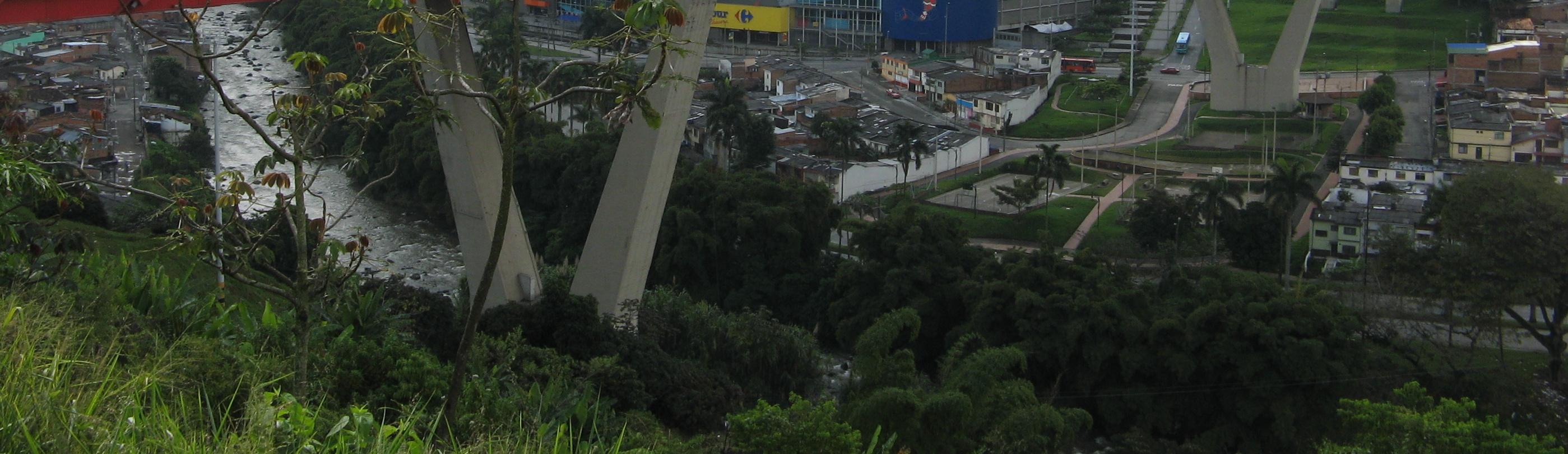
Otún River in Pereira, Colombia

The Otún River (Río Otún) is a river in the Risaralda department of Colombia. Its source is Lake Otún, fed by meltwater from Nevado Santa Isabel, and its outlet is the Cauca River. The Otún River passes between the cities of Pere ira and Dosquebradas, and is crossed at that point by the César Gaviria Trujillo Viaduct, one of the largest cable-stayed bridges in South America.

The Otún River is the only source of drinking water for Pereira and Dosquebradas. The local water company takes about 1.8 cubic metres per second (64 cu ft/s) from the river at a site known as Nuevo Libaré. Agricultural development in that region has affected the quality of the water from the river, with pig and chicken farms as well as human waste water being major sources of bacteriological contamination.

The river passes through several protected zones including the Otún Quimbaya Flora and Fauna Sanctuary.

== Notes ==
1. Trejos Gómez et al. (2003).
