= La Virginia =

Coordinates: 4°55′N 75°50′W

- Municipality and town
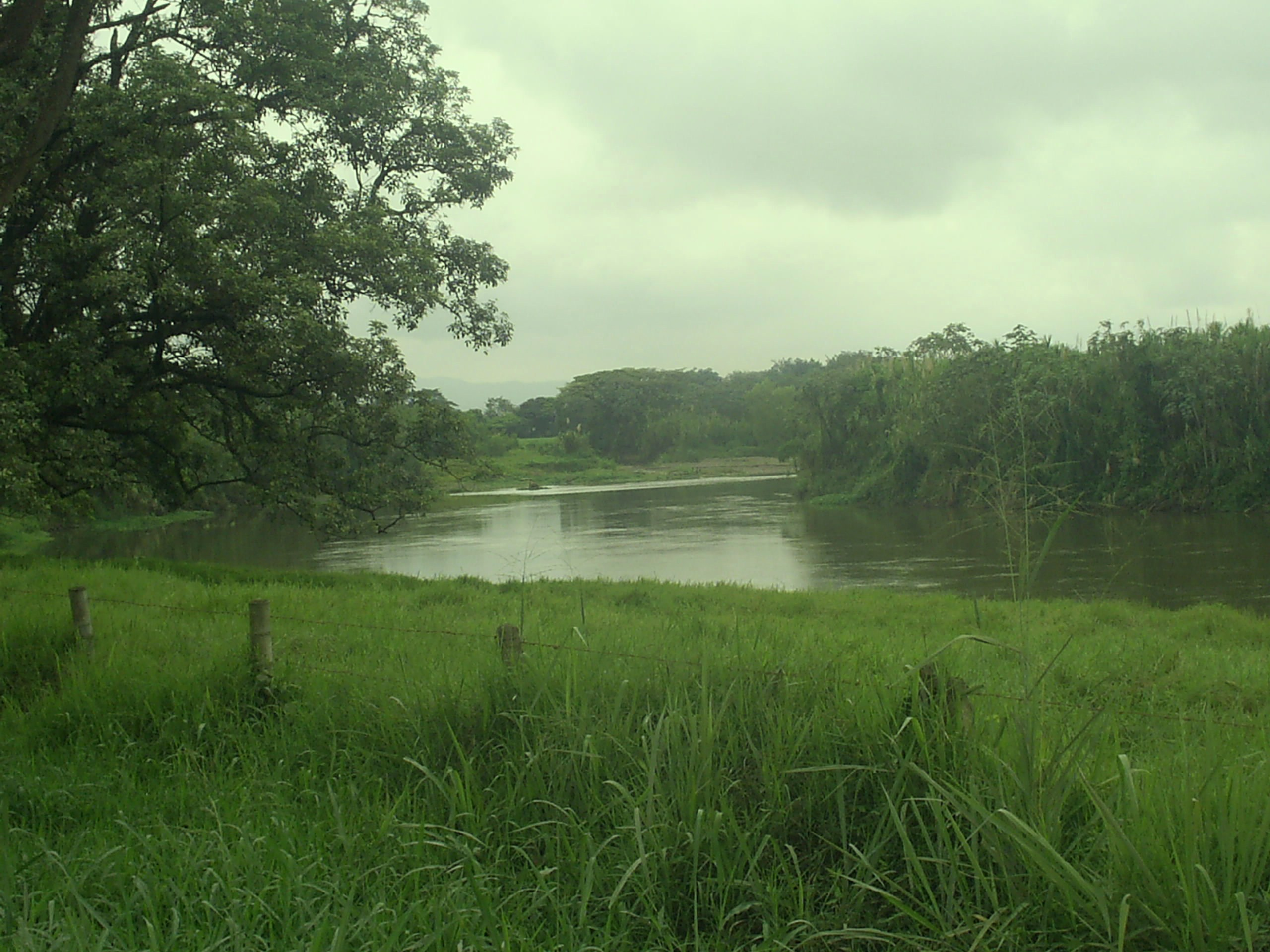
- Cauca River. Between Cartago and La Virginia, Risaralda, Colombia.

- Flag Coat of arms

- Location of the municipality and town of La Virginia in the Risaralda Department of Colombia.
- Country: Colombia
- Department: Risaralda Department
- Elevation: 899 m (2,949 ft)

Population (2023)
  - Total: 28,488
- Time zone: UTC-5 (Colombia Standard Time)

La Virginia (Spanish pronunciation: [la βiɾˈxinja] is a town and municipality in the Department of Risaralda, Colombia. About 50 km away from the capital Pereira. In 2023 the town had an estimated population of 28,488.

== History ==
Founded in 1959 by Francisco Jaramillo, Pedro Martínez and Leonardo Villa, among others. This Municipality was in its beginnings a Palenque for black fugitives from slavery. The initial hamlet was called Sopinga and then Nigricia in the mid-19th century. On November 27, 1959, La Virginia was declared a municipality, since it previously belonged to Belalcazar, Caldas.

== Climate ==
La Virginia has an average annual temperature of 23°C.

Climate data for La Virginia (Bomehia La), elevation 970 m (3,180 ft), (1981–2010)
Month	Jan	Feb	Mar	Apr	May	Jun	Jul	Aug	Sep	Oct	Nov	Dec	Year
Mean daily maximum °C (°F)	30.6 (87.1)	31.0 (87.8)	30.6 (87.1)	29.9 (85.8)	29.6 (85.3)	29.7 (85.5)	30.3 (86.5)	30.7 (87.3)	30.5 (86.9)	29.5 (85.1)	29.2 (84.6)	29.6 (85.3)	30.1 (86.2)
Daily mean °C (°F)	24.1 (75.4)	24.3 (75.7)	24.2 (75.6)	23.9 (75.0)	23.8 (74.8)	23.9 (75.0)	24.1 (75.4)	24.4 (75.9)	23.9 (75.0)	23.4 (74.1)	23.4 (74.1)	23.7 (74.7)	23.9 (75.0)
Mean daily minimum °C (°F)	19.1 (66.4)	19.3 (66.7)	19.3 (66.7)	19.5 (67.1)	19.5 (67.1)	19.1 (66.4)	18.8 (65.8)	18.7 (65.7)	18.8 (65.8)	18.9 (66.0)	19.1 (66.4)	19.1 (66.4)	19.1 (66.4)
Average precipitation mm (inches)	109.3 (4.30)	105.7 (4.16)	176.0 (6.93)	210.5 (8.29)	247.2 (9.73)	148.4 (5.84)	131.0 (5.16)	122.2 (4.81)	161.3 (6.35)	184.6 (7.27)	216.7 (8.53)	139.4 (5.49)	1,952.3 (76.86)
Average precipitation days	13	13	17	20	20	17	14	13	16	20	20	16	197
Average relative humidity (%)	74	73	75	78	80	78	74	72	74	77	78	77	76
Mean monthly sunshine hours	198.4	166.6	170.5	141.0	148.8	150.0	182.9	186.0	162.0	151.9	156.0	179.8	1,993.9
Mean daily sunshine hours	6.4	5.9	5.5	4.7	4.8	5.0	5.9	6.0	5.4	4.9	5.2	5.8	5.5
Source: Instituto de Hidrologia Meteorologia y Estudios Ambientales
