= Megacable (Pereira) =

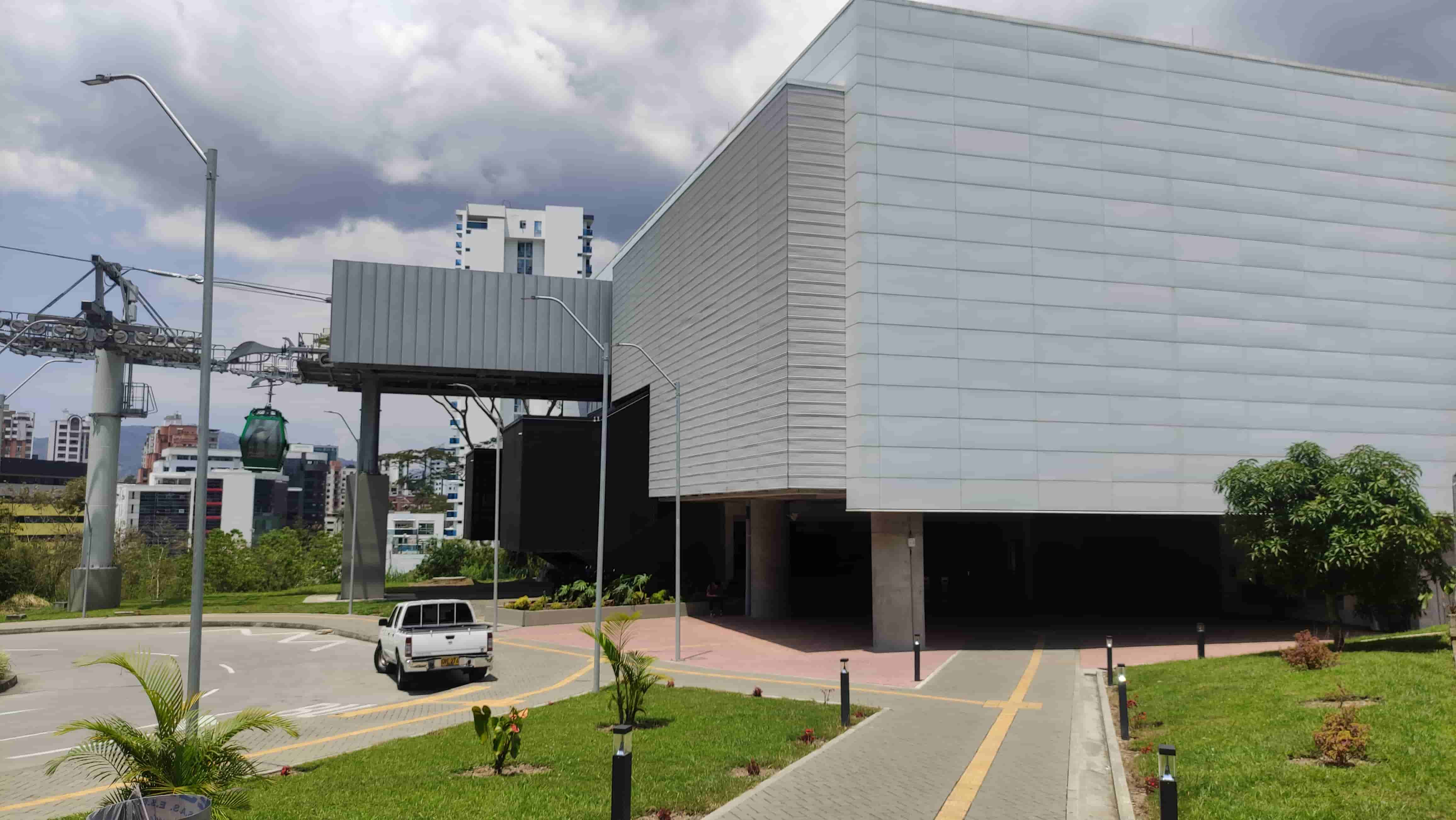

Overview
- Status: Operational
- Character: Urban
- System: Megabús
- Location: Pereira, Colombia
- Termini: Parque Olaya; Las Brisas
- Open: September 20, 2021; 4 years ago

Operation
- Ridership: 1.97 million (2025)

Technical features
- Line length: 3.4 km (2.1 mi)
- Operating speed: 5 metres per second (16 ft/s)
Route map
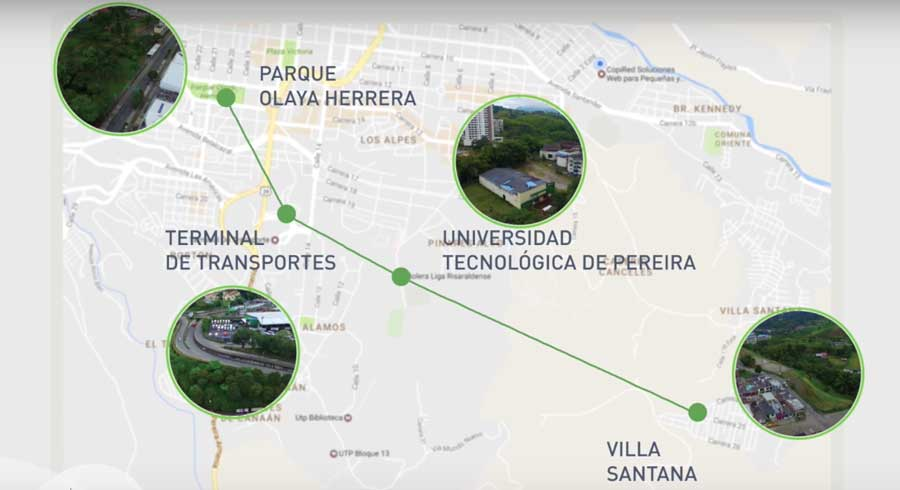

Megacable is a gondola lift line implemented in the city of Pereira, Colombia, with the purpose of providing urban public transport complementary to the service of the Megabús bus rapid transit system. With a length of 3,4 km, it is the longest urban line in Colombia and was opened on 20 September 2021.

== Network ==
The network has only one operating line, which follows a north west–south east direction, connecting the centre of Pereira, at Parque Olaya station, with Las Brisas station, in Villa Santana commune.

== See also ==
Media related to Megacable (Pereira) at Wikimedia Commons

- List of gondola lifts
