= Sidssy =

Colombian human rights activist and plastic artist

Sidssy Paolín Luz María Uribe Vásquez
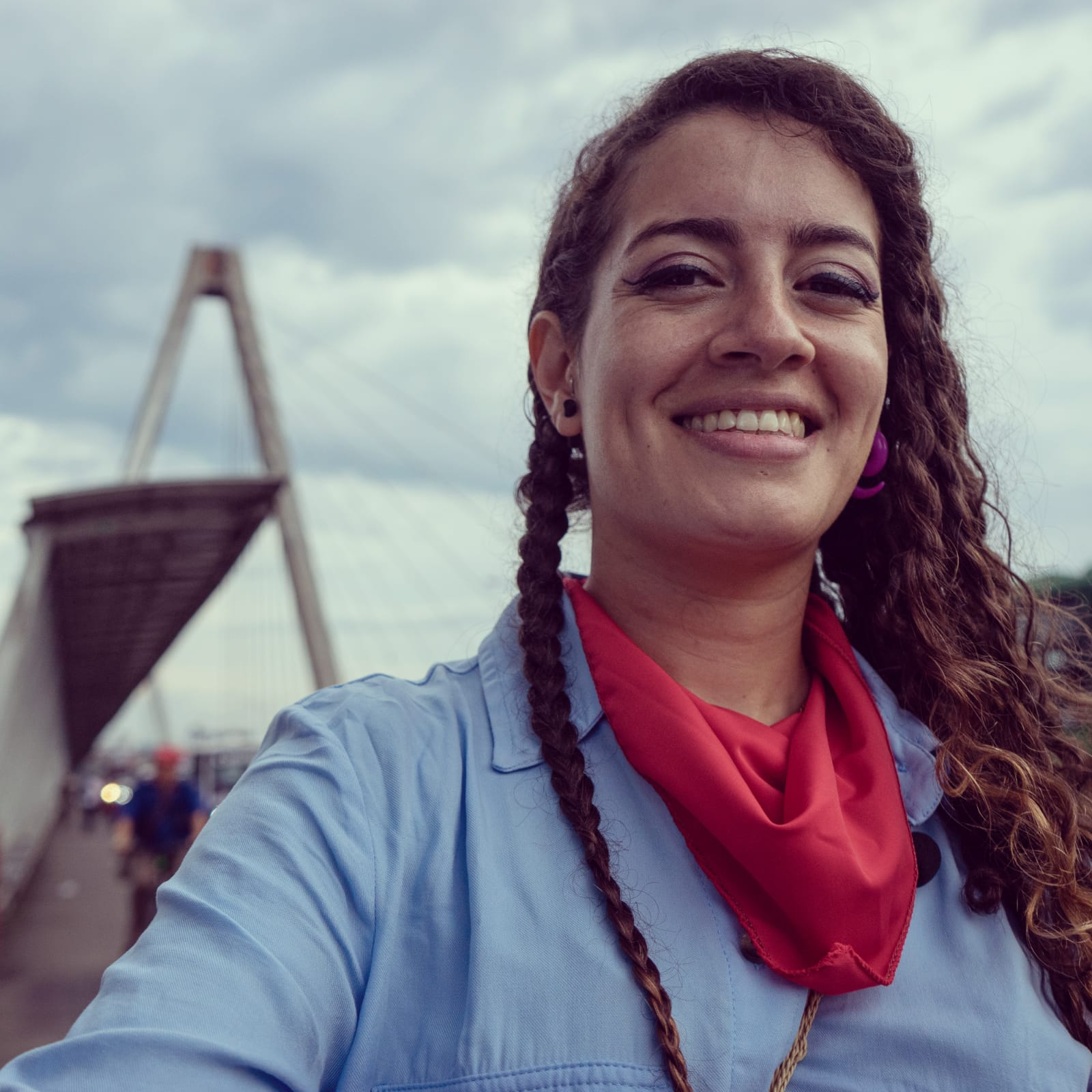
- Born: Pereira, Risaralda, Colombia
- Other names: Sidssy Uribe, Sidssy
- Citizenship: Colombian
- Occupation(s): Human rights defender, artist
- Relatives: Lucas Villa

Sidssy Paolin Luz María Uribe Vásquez, also known as Sidssy Uribe and mononymously as Sidssy, is a Colombian plastic artist and human rights activist. Currently, she serves as a state crime victims defender. In 2024, she was a candidate for the Pereira city council as part of the Independientes party.

== Early life ==
Sidssy was born into a large middle-class family as the eldest daughter of Manuel Guillermo Uribe Zuluaga and Nohora Stella Vásquez Beltrán out of six siblings. She completed her first studies in various schools including Betlemitas, Boyacá and La Salle at Pereira. With the help of her father, she completed her bachelorship in a semester at Compuestudio in Itagüí.

In 2018, she began her architecture career at the Catholic University of Pereira, after living in the city of Cali for the previous two years. However, she only attended one semester due to economic problems.

== Activism ==
Since 2018, she has been an activist for the justice administration in Colombia. Starting after the murder of Lucas Villa, she criticized how speedy the Office of the Attorney General of Colombia works in cases of celebrities but the slowness in cases of regular citizens. She eventually got the help of other artists such as Residente. She also promotes the social dialog between the state and the armed groups in order to collaborate with it to solve the judicial cases, but doesn't support the impunity. Sidssy had sent proposals related to her views to Gustavo Petro, who claimed to be studying them.

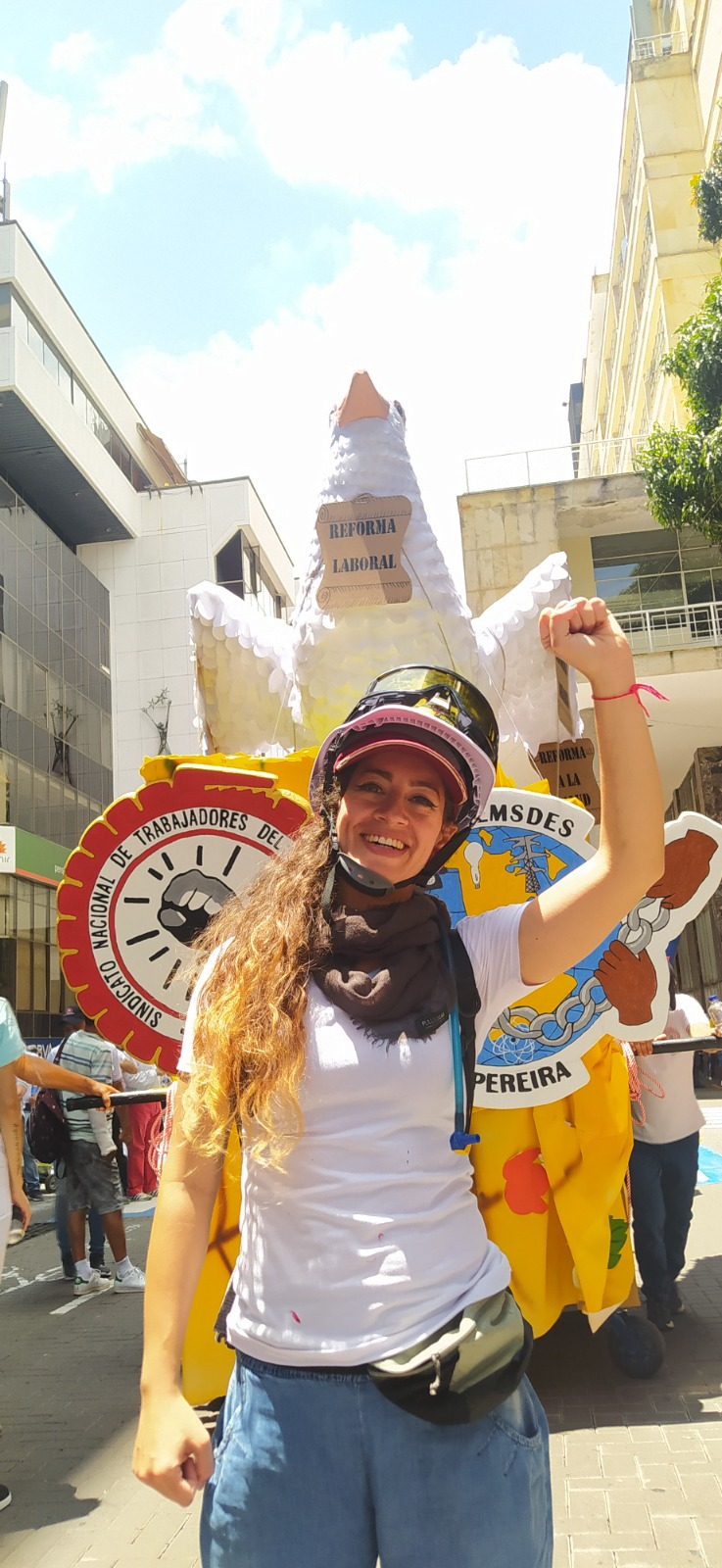

== Censure motion to the Minister of National Defense ==
She was invited to the Congress of Colombia to speak her complaints against Diego Molano Aponte, the former Minister of National Defense. There, she argued that the minister's omissions in terms of security and his lack of legitimacy after validating the bombing of minors and qualifying them as war machines was enough to oust him from office. Likewise, she demanded that the Senate take urgent measures on efforts to do so.

== Death threats ==
According to various media outlets, Sidssy was the target of death threats and attempts to smear her for her social activism and justice management in the case of Lucas Villa.
