= Technological University of Pereira =

Public research university in Pereira, Colombia

Coordinates: 4°47′42″N 75°41′19″W

- Universidad Tecnológica de Pereira
- Motto: Scientia et Technica pro Humanitate sub Libertatis Tutela
- Motto in English: Science and Technology for Humanity under the Protection of Freedom
- Type: Public research university
- Established: 1958
- Rector: Luis Fernando Gaviria Trujillo
- Location: Pereira, Risaralda, Colombia
- Nickname: UTP
- Website: utp.edu.co

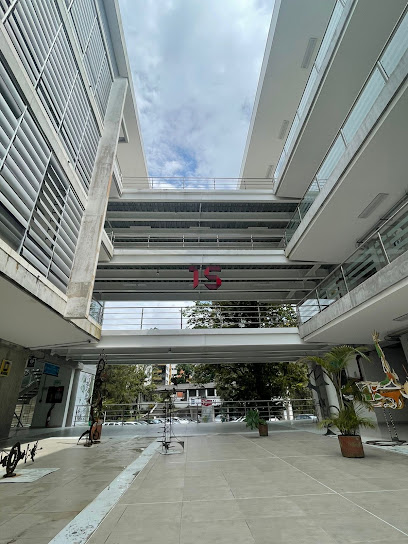
Capmus of the Technological University of Pereira

The Technological University of Pereira (Spanish: Universidad Tecnológica de Pereira) is a national public research university in Pereira, Risaralda, Colombia. The university is located in the southeast of the city.

The university offers studies in engineering (Industrial engineering, Engineering physics, Systems engineering and Computer science, Electrical engineering, Mechanical engineering); Science and Technology (Veterinary medicine, Medicine, Chemical technology, Industrial chemistry, Environmental management); Liberal arts (English, Spanish language and Literature, philosophy, Communication and Computer Education); Child pedagogy; and Sports science and recreation.

== History ==
The school was founded in 1958 by a group of people who wanted to supplement the agricultural vocation of the region with scientific and technological development. Act 41 of 1958 established the Universidad Tecnológica de Pereira as an official sectional institution. The school subsequently established itself at the national level, a legal entity with administrative autonomy and independent assets under the Ministry of Education. The university started work on March 4, 1961, under the leadership of its founder and first director, Dr. Jorge Roa Martinez.

Academic activity began with the Faculty of Electrical Engineering; the following year, the Schools of Mechanical and Industrial Engineering were created. In 1965, the Musical Pedagogical Institute of Fine Arts was founded. Act 61 of 1963 established the Polytechnic University, whose work began in 1966 with the Assistant School of Engineering: Electrical, Mechanical and Industrial (now the Faculty of Technology). The programs in drafting and chemical Laboratory (now converted into its own School of Chemistry) began in 1968.

The Faculty of Education was founded in 1967, with programs in Social science, Spanish, audiovisual communication, Mathematics and Physics. In 1977 the Faculty of Medicine was established. In 1981, the Musical Pedagogical Institute of Fine Arts was created in the Faculty of Fine Arts and Humanities, offering the Bachelor in Fine Arts and Music. In 1983, attached to the Faculty of Mechanical Engineering, the masters program in automated production systems was created. The Graduate School of Industrial Engineering Faculty was established in 1984 with MBA programs of Economic, Financial and Operations research, Statistics. With the implementation of Decree Law 80 of 1980, a new organizational structure for the university gave rise to the Faculty of Basic Sciences and the Faculty of Technology. The latter was formerly known as Polytechnic University. In 1988 the pre-degree in philosophy was developed, attached to the Faculty of Fine Arts and Humanities. In 1989 they created the program of Sports Science and Recreation, attached to the Faculty of Medicine.

In 1991 at the Faculty of Basic Sciences Programme was created, along with Computer Systems Engineering. In 1991 they created the School of Environmental Sciences with an undergraduate in Environmental Management. In 1993 at the Faculty of Industrial Engineering established the Specialization Program in Human Development Management. In 1994 they created the Master in Electrical Engineering programme and the specialization in Power Electronics, assigned to the Faculty of Electrical Engineering. That same year, in the Faculty of Education. an undergraduate degree in Ethnic Education and Community Development was established. The Faculty of Educational Sciences began offering a Specialization Program in Contemporary History of Colombia and regional development in 1995. Also in 1995, the medical school created a specialization in health systems management.

== Jorge Roa Martinez Library ==
The Jorge Roa Martinez Library began its work in 1962. In 1977 it took the name Centre Library and Information Science and had a collection of 14,000 volumes and 621 periodical titles.

== Academic programs ==
=== Undergraduate ===
- Faculty of Fine Arts and Humanities: This school offers the Bachelor of Visual Arts, BA in English Language Teaching, Degree in Philosophy and Bachelor of Music.
- Faculty of Environmental Science: This faculty conducts coursework in environmental management and sustainable tourism management.
- Faculty of Basic Sciences: The Faculty of Basic Sciences offers the Degree in Mathematics and Physics.
- Faculty of Education Sciences: Available studies in this school include the BA in Spanish and Literature, BA in Ethnic Education and Community Development, Degree in Child Education and BA in Communication and Computer Education.
- Faculty of Health Sciences: The medical school offers studies in medicine and surgery, science of sport and recreation, veterinary medicine and animal science, prehospital care technology, and physiotherapy and kinesiology.
- Faculty of Engineering: Electrical, Electronics, Physics and Computer Science
- Faculty of Industrial Engineering
- Faculty of Mechanical Engineering
- Faculty of Technology

=== Postgraduate ===
The school offers Ph.D. and Masters programmes in many specialties.

== Accreditation ==
The Technological University of Pereira has received the High Quality Accreditation by Resolution No. 2550 dated June 30, 2005. Bureau Veritas Certification has awarded certificates in management (ISO 9001: 2000) and governance in administrative processes that support the teaching, research and extension (NTC GP 1000: 2000). The Superintendency of Industry and Commerce gave the university an accreditation as a certification body to allow them to issue patent stamps.

== See also ==
- List of universities in Colombia
