= Pereira, Colombia =

City in Colombia and capital of the Risaralda department

Pereira
- City
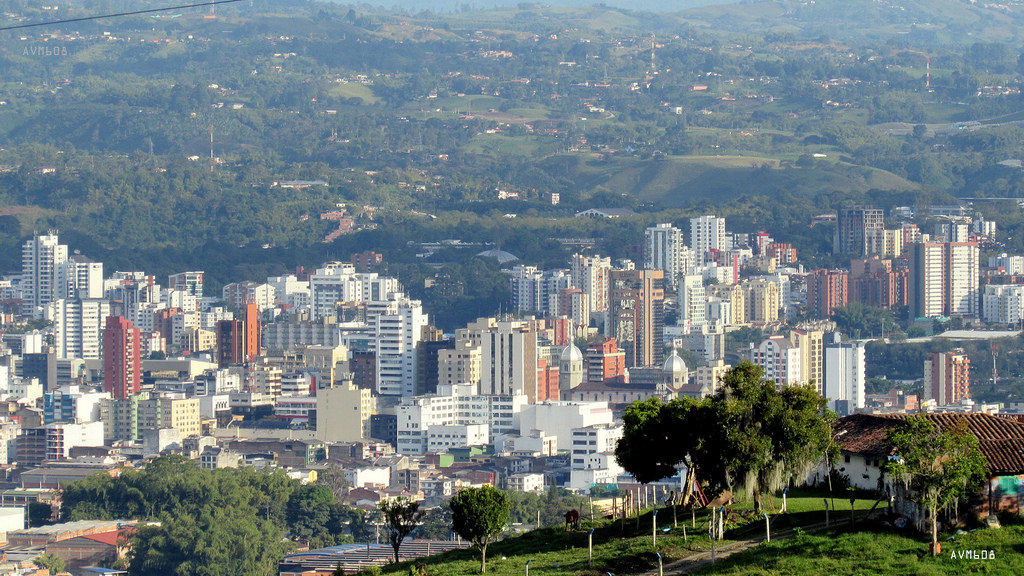
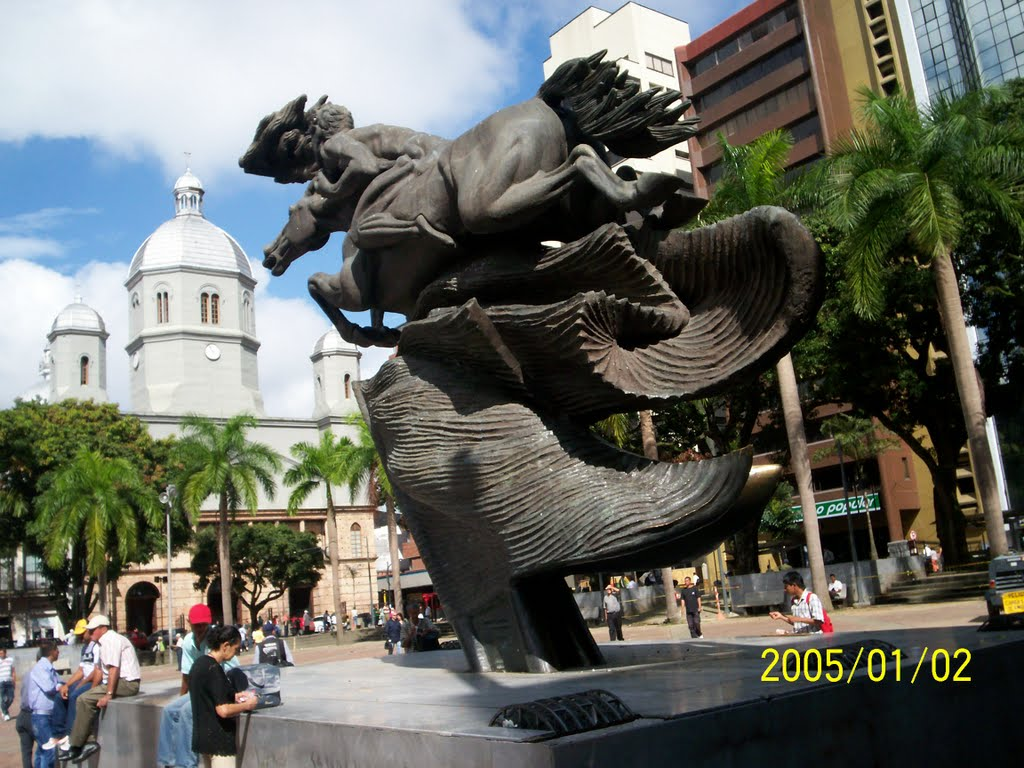
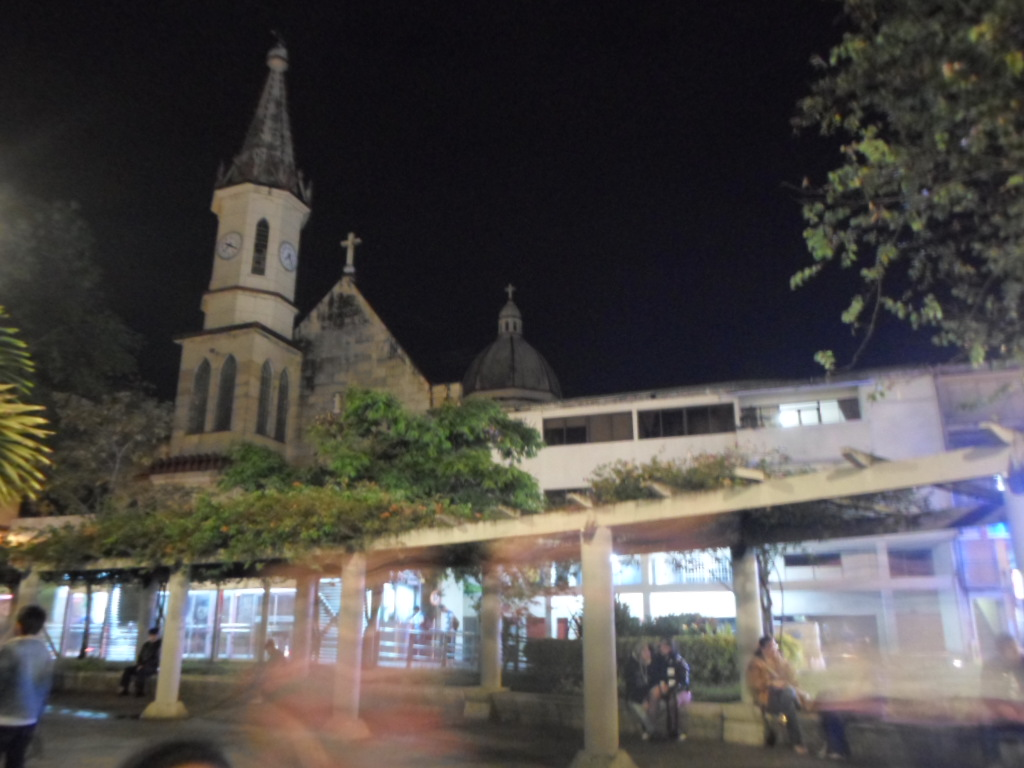
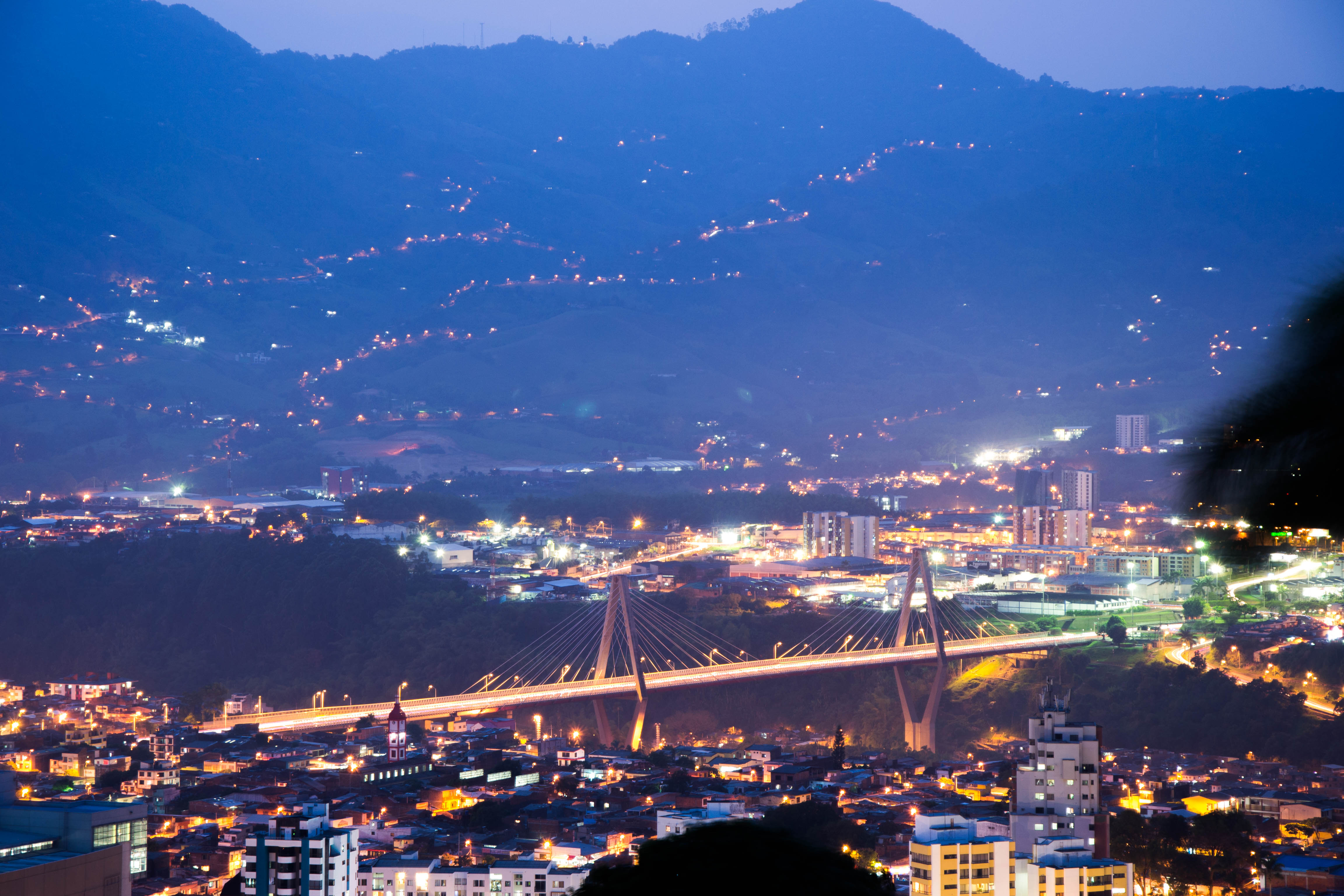
- From the top: Skyline, Naked Bolívar, Church Antonio Maria Claret and César Gaviria Trujillo Viaduct

- Flag Coat of arms
- Nicknames: La Querendona, Trasnochadora y Morena
- Motto: Pereira con Vida (Spanish: Pereira with Life)
- Location of the city and municipality of Pereira in Risaralda Department.

- Location in Colombia
- Coordinates: 4°48′52″N 75°41′41″W
- Country: Colombia
- Region: Andean
- Department: Risaralda
- Foundation: August 30, 1863
- Named for: Francisco Pereira Martínez

Government
  - Mayor: Mauricio Salazar Peláez (2024-2027)

Area
  - City: 702 km^{2} (271 sq mi)
  - Metro: 628 km^{2} (242 sq mi)
- Elevation: 1,411 m (4,629 ft)

Population (2023, DANE)
  - City: 481,768
  - Density: 686/km^{2} (1,780/sq mi)
  - Metro: 735,796
- Demonym(s): Pereiran, Pereirano/a (Spanish), Paisa
- Time zone: UTC-05 (Eastern Time Zone)
- Area code: 57 + 6
- Website: Official website (in Spanish)

Pereira (Spanish pronunciation: [peˈɾejɾa]) is the capital city of the Colombian department of Risaralda. It is located in the foothills of the Andes in a coffee-producing area of Colombia officially known as the "Coffee Axis". Pereira, alongside the rest of the Coffee Axis, form part of UNESCO World Heritage Site known as the "Coffee Cultural Landscape of Colombia". It is the most populated city in the Coffee Axis. Pereira is also part of the Central West Metropolitan Area, which has 735.769 residents and is composed of Pereira and the neighboring cities of Dosquebradas and La Virginia. It is considered the most important city in the "Coffee Axis" from a geopolitical and economic standpoint.

As the capital of the department of Risaralda, Pereira houses the headquarters of the Government of Risaralda, the Departmental Assembly, the Departmental Court, the Metropolitan Area Authority and the Attorney General. It also serves as the headquarters for numerous public companies and institutions of the Colombian state. Being in the center of the Golden Triangle (which consists of the cities of Bogotá, Medellín, and Cali), Pereira has become especially important in the fields of trade and commerce.

== Toponymy ==
Pereira was named after lawyer, land owner and naturist Francisco Pereira Martínez. He was a supporter of independence of the city, located in the same place as Old Cartago.

The city of Pereira is known as "the pearl of Otún".

== Geography ==
Pereira is located within the Golden Triangle of Colombia, a broad zone informally delimited by tracing this figure over the map of Bogotá, Medellín and Cali. More narrowly defined, Pereira lies in the Central Cordillera (mountain range) of Colombia in the Otún and Cauca river valleys.

The municipal area is 702 km^{2} It shares boundaries with the municipalities of La Virginia, Marsella and Dosquebradas to the north, Santa Rosa de Cabal the northeast, Tolima to the east, Quindío and Valle del Cauca to the south and Balboa and Valle del Cauca to the west.

Pereira, like many Colombian cities, has high-elevation areas with difficult access or flat or steep parts. The streets are laid out according to the elevation of the respective zones.

The greater part of the municipal territory corresponds to the sheer elevations of the Central Mountain range. Among the orographic accidents are the snowcapped Quindio, Ruiz, and Santa Isabel, located in the limits with the departments of Quindío, Caldas and Tolima respectively. It also has other accidents like Santa Barbara, also known as the Alto del Nudo. The hydrographic system of the municipality includes the rivers Cauca, Barbas, La Vieja, Otún and Consota, with its many tributaries. The area enjoys a variety of climates, with the following thermal floors: warm, 60 km^{2}; Medium, 367 km^{2}; Cold, 70 km^{2} and páramo, with 107 km^{2}.

=== Climate ===
The climate of Pereira oscillates between warm climate 9.9%, moderate climate 60.7%, cold climate 11.5%, paramo 17.7%. Its annual average rainfall is 2,750 mm.

The Pereirano territory, which extends mainly from east to west, gives the city different climates within its boundaries. For example, the areas of Caimalito and Cerritos to the west of the city, near the river Cauca, have temperatures up to 27 °C, since the height in this zone is from 950 to 1250 m. At the other end is the Julita area, where the Technological University of Pereira is located. Due to the territory occupied by large forests, it is one of the coldest areas of the city, with high humidity. The temperature in this zone ranges around 17 °C, with an average height of about 1550 msnm.

This diversity of climates and terrain offers a rich range of vegetation and landscape coverage, providing Pereira with one of the richest biodiversities of the nation. However, the city is also an area of high seismic vulnerability due to the type of soils that make up it and the geological faults that cross it.

Pereira's climate is subtropical highland. Over the course of the year, the temperature typically varies from 17 °C (63 °F ) to 26 °C (79 °F) and is rarely below 16 °C (61 °F) or above 29 °C (83 °F).

The average temperature of Pereira is 21 °C (69 °F).

Climate data for Pereira (Matecaña International Airport), elevation 1,342 m (4,403 ft), (1991–2020)
Month	Jan	Feb	Mar	Apr	May	Jun	Jul	Aug	Sep	Oct	Nov	Dec	Year
Mean daily maximum °C (°F)	27.2 (81.0)	27.4 (81.3)	27.0 (80.6)	26.4 (79.5)	26.1 (79.0)	26.3 (79.3)	26.9 (80.4)	27.3 (81.1)	27.0 (80.6)	26.2 (79.2)	25.9 (78.6)	26.4 (79.5)	26.7 (80.1)
Daily mean °C (°F)	21.8 (71.2)	22.0 (71.6)	21.9 (71.4)	21.5 (70.7)	21.4 (70.5)	21.5 (70.7)	21.7 (71.1)	22.0 (71.6)	21.5 (70.7)	20.9 (69.6)	20.9 (69.6)	21.4 (70.5)	21.5 (70.7)
Mean daily minimum °C (°F)	17.7 (63.9)	17.9 (64.2)	17.9 (64.2)	17.8 (64.0)	17.9 (64.2)	17.8 (64.0)	17.6 (63.7)	17.6 (63.7)	17.5 (63.5)	17.4 (63.3)	17.6 (63.7)	17.7 (63.9)	17.7 (63.9)
Average precipitation mm (inches)	127.9 (5.04)	151.1 (5.95)	245.3 (9.66)	254.8 (10.03)	260.9 (10.27)	199.3 (7.85)	128.8 (5.07)	128.7 (5.07)	173.9 (6.85)	281.7 (11.09)	302.1 (11.89)	206.0 (8.11)	2,460.5 (96.87)
Average precipitation days (≥ 1 mm)	11.1	12.6	16.0	18.4	18.1	15.9	13.7	11.7	14.8	18.4	19.1	14.6	184.4
Average relative humidity (%)	75	74	76	79	79	78	75	74	76	79	79	77	77
Mean monthly sunshine hours	186.0	160.9	155.0	132.0	139.5	147.0	182.9	182.9	150.0	142.6	150.0	167.4	1,896.2
Mean daily sunshine hours	6.0	5.7	5.0	4.4	4.5	4.9	5.9	5.9	5.0	4.6	5.0	5.4	5.2
Source: Instituto de Hidrologia Meteorologia y Estudios Ambientales (mean temperature, humidity, sun 1981-2010)

=== Waterways ===
Lake Otún, which feeds the River Otun, is the main body of water in the city. The river system of the municipality includes the Cauca, The Barbas River, the La Vieja River, the Otún River, the Consota, and many tributaries.

== History ==
The history of the city goes back to the pre-Columbian era, in which the current city area was inhabited by the Quimbaya and Pijao cultures, widely recognized for their goldsmiths. In this region, Marshal Jorge Robledo founded the city of Cartago (Carthage) on August 9, 1540, but due to the siege of the pijaos or reasons of economic expediency this city was moved in 1691 to the site that currently occupies the north end of the Valley of the Cauca, towards the banks of the La Vieja river. The original site became jungle again and buried the remains of civilization. On the few ruins of the Spanish population, crossed by the route that led from Valle del Cauca to Medellín, through Manizales, a group of 20 Antioqueno families had already built their homes when a handful of Vallecaucanos appeared to find the population of Carthage La Vieja, today Pereira. Although the formal foundation came from the Caucano group, the emergence of Pereira was another chapter of the Antioqueno colonization, and the contribution of other social groups such as the Caucano was in its beginning relatively scarce.

Later, with the ideal of reviving this city, which until then was a jungle area, on August 24, 1863, the presbyter Remigio Antonio Cañarte and Jesús María Ormaza Niño, among others, returned to the ruins of ancient Carthage, where they established a few huts that were blessed on August 30 of the same year. For 6 years the settlement was called Carthage, but in 1869 it was renamed Villa de Pereira, in honor of the doctor Francisco Pereira Martínez, who in 1816 took refuge in the area, along with his brother Manuel Pereira, after the defeat of the Patriotic forces in the Battle of Cachirí during the Spanish reconquest of New Granada.

From 1870 and especially as a result of the civil wars of 1876 and 1885, the region received a new wave of immigrants from Antioquia. The settler group of 1863 and following years had been formed by forest reclaimers who only aspired to have a single plot of land, while the second group was made up of men of greater ambition and greater entrepreneurial capacity. Some of them were linked to Antioquian capitalists who financed their activities, which involved leveling mountains and starting cattle ranches using peonadas and heavy capital investments. The arrival in the city of a group of merchants and professionals at the end of the 19th century and beginning of the 20th introduced education as a new reason for social differentiation. A new elite group emerged that became a leader of the economic, civic, and political activities of the city.

Pereira was the city where the last execution in Colombia took place. David López, 19, was indicted for the murder of Ricardo Torres on November 30, 1888. Lopez unsuccessfully exhausted all appeals to spare his life; he was executed in Pereira on July 26, 1890, after telling the firing squad to shoot directly at his heart.

In the 1920s, settlers from Antioquia moved to Pereira for its economically strategic location, fertile soil, and good weather. The settlers grew large quantities of high-quality coffee in the mineral-rich, volcanic Andean soil. Other produce included sugarcane and cattle. Settlers also came from cities such as Valle del Cauca and Bogotá. In the 1950s, during a period of bipartisan political struggle in the country, Pereira became a refuge for thousands of Colombians, quadrupling its population and creating a national melting pot that changed its community forever. In recent years, the city has achieved an urban identity and a significant growth in its cultural development. Social integration and higher levels of education are providing the city sustained economic and cultural growth.

In the economic recession of 1999, and the stagnant years of 2000 and 2001, some residents of Pereira emigrated to the United States and Spain. Towards the years 2005 and 2006, Pereira recovered from decline and went into an economic boom, with new office, retail and housing development, and most importantly Megabus, the main public transportation system, opening to the public. In 2015 the new Biopark Ukumari was opened to the public in its initial phase with 2 bioregions. It is planned to have up to 8 bioregions including the Andean Mountains, African desert, Amazonas and many more, including a section designed for mechanical rides.

Up until 2016, Pereira has been an epicenter of massive urban redevelopment with many international companies opening new stores, factories, and logistical centers. The unemployment rate has decreased significantly from being one of the highest in the country, to the national standard of 9%. Pereira is beginning to transform into the capital city of the Coffee Axis or Eje Cafetero region, with many residents from neighbouring cities such as Armenia and Manizales coming to Pereira to shop for goods in stores that are unique to Pereira.

== Governance ==
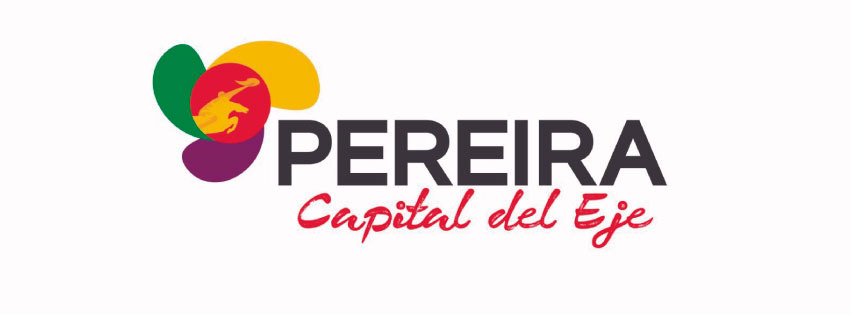
Logo of the Mayor of Pereira

The Pereira municipal area covers 702 square kilometres (702,000,000 m^{2}). Pereira is divided into 19 neighbourhoods: Ferrocarril, Olímpica, San Joaquín, Cuba, Del Café, El Oso, Perla del Otún, Consota, El Rocío, El Poblado, El Jardín, San Nicolás, Centro, Río Otún, Boston, Universidad, Villavicencio, Oriente y Villasantana.

Pereira has also rural neighbourhoods called Altagracia, Arabia, Caimalito, Cerritos, La Florida, Puerto Caldas, Combia Alta, Combia Baja, La Bella, Estrella-La Palmilla, Morelia, Tribunas. Together with La Virginia and Dosquebradas, Pereira forms the Area Metropolitana de Centro Occidente (AMCO). The three cities cooperate on various affairs and share many services such as the Megabus system.

== Demographics ==
In 2023, Pereira had about 481,768 residents, the fourteenth largest city of Colombia. Pereira has a twin city, Dosquebradas (about five minutes drive from the Plaza de Bolivar), which has about 225,540 residents. With a total population of about 735,796, the Pereira conurbation also includes La Virginia. Pereira, Dosquebradas and La Virginia comprise the Pereira metropolitan area. As a result of urbanisation, Pereira has one of the most equitable distributions of wealth in Colombia.

== Economy ==
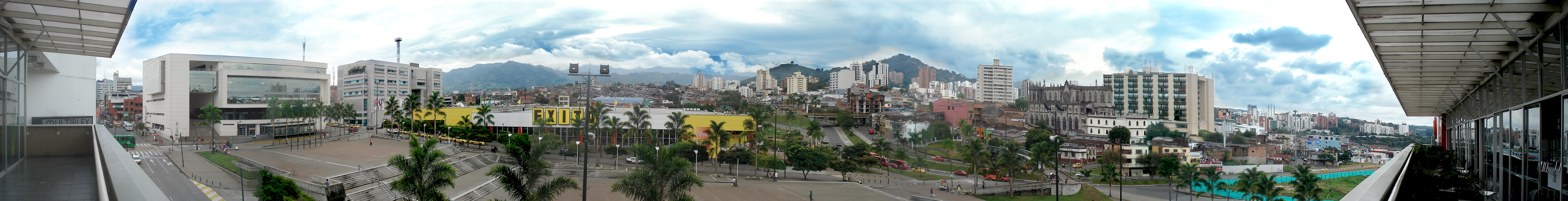
A panorama of Pereira

The municipality of Pereira has a diversified economy in its economic structure, with the primary sector accounting for 5.7% of the GDP, the secondary sector 26.2%, and the tertiary sector 68.1%. Pereira's economy grew 3.7% in 2004, due to the flagship program of the national government, greater fluidity in the financial system, contributions from overseas residents who have an important impact on consumption, and improved prices for oil, coal, nickel, and coffee. These developments were reflected in the increase in both the supply and demand for goods and services.

Trade is the second-most significant generating employment activity. An important part of the city's trade is already in shopping centers (Alcides Arevalo, Bolivar Plaza, Lake Plaza, Novacentro, Parque Arboleda, Pereira Plaza, Victoria, Unicentro, etc.) where there is a wide variety of products and services.

Hotels and resorts have been constructed in recent years, with several establishments located in downtown Pereira and in the outskirts such as Sonesta Cerritos in response to an increase of visitors to the city for various reasons, creating added value in different sectors.

=== Agriculture ===
In the region of Pereira, agricultural employment is 70 percent based in permanent cropping, 8 percent in annual crops and 22 percent engaging transient workers. Agricultural products include a variety of crops such as coffee, pineapple, sugarcane, cacao, cereals, rubber, and livestock. Pereira is part of the Colombian coffee growing axis.

=== Manufacturing ===
Pereira's main manufacturing product is apparel. Other products include aluminium goods, motorcycles, and telecommunications technology. Pereira also hosts multinational corporations such as Avesco, Nestle, and Coats. In the future, ethanol may be produced in Pereira, as sugarcane, an essential raw material for ethanol production, is farmed in the nearby Cauca valley.

=== Logistics ===
Pereira is a centre for transport logistics. Logistics companies include Servientrega International Logistics, FedEx, DHL, Central, and TCC. There are logistics centers in Dosquebradas and Alpina.

In 2016, two major companies opened logistical centers in Pereira. The first was Deprisa, the subsidiary company of Avianca for correspondence and mail; it opened in Pereira as a logistical center for the entire Coffee Axis region. The second was for the national supermarket chain Exito, serving the cities of Manizales, Pereira, Armenia and Cartago.

Pereira is also in the process of building two logistical parks, which already house important national companies such as a D1 Supermarkets distribution center, as well as an Alberto VO5 national distribution center.

Pereira also houses the Zona Franca, or Free Zone which is becoming increasingly important on a national level.

=== Trade and commerce ===
Trade and commerce is the second biggest employment sector in Pereira and in 2010. Commercial enterprises include numerous malls, home centers, hypermarkets, and supermarkets. There are also fast food outlets, hotels, and a convention centre.

== Tourism ==
Pereira is known nationally for being an important city for tourism, attracting visitors as it is the center of the Coffee Cultural Landscape as named by UNESCO. Pereira has several landmarks which attract tourists, such as the Bolivar Statue, the Viaduct, and its many open-air swimming pools and recreational parks. Lake Otún and Santa Isabel provide destinations for sports adventure tourism. Pereira also has a night life scene with bars and nightclubs, located mostly on Circunvalar Avenue. Pereira is also a health destination, with many clinics housing health care specialists, as well as esthetic clinics. The city is also the most common setting for two Colombian soap operas on Netflix: Sin senos no hay paraíso, and the sequel Sin senos sí hay paraíso. It is also very close to Cocora Valley (Valle de Cocora in Spanish) which is around 45 minutes drive from Pereira and famous for its giant palm trees visited by all types of domestic and international tourists every year.

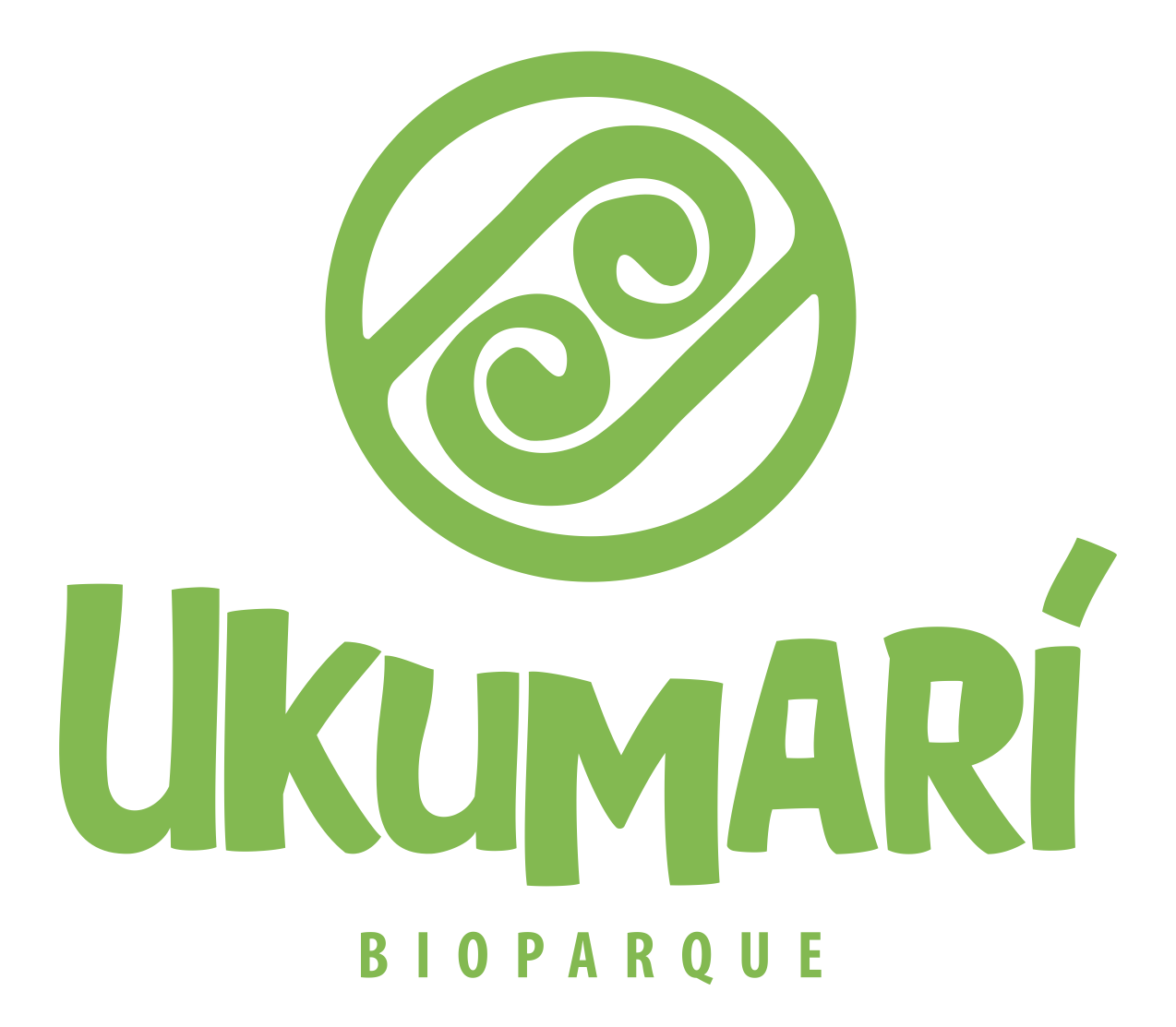
Logo of Ukumari Biopark

=== Ukumari Biopark ===
The Flora and Fauna Theme Park or "Bioparque" Ukumari is located in the sector of Galicia, 14 kilometers from the city. It is known as the most ambitious tourist project of the Coffee Axis and the largest theme park in Latin America with an area of 820,000 m^{2}. Animals will be in natural environments that represent the continents of Africa, America, Eurasia, Australia, and Colombia's Eastern Plains, Amazon, Atlantic Coast, and Coffee Axis regions. This biopark will feature 3D attractions, interactive games, and adrenaline-related biodiversity scenarios.11

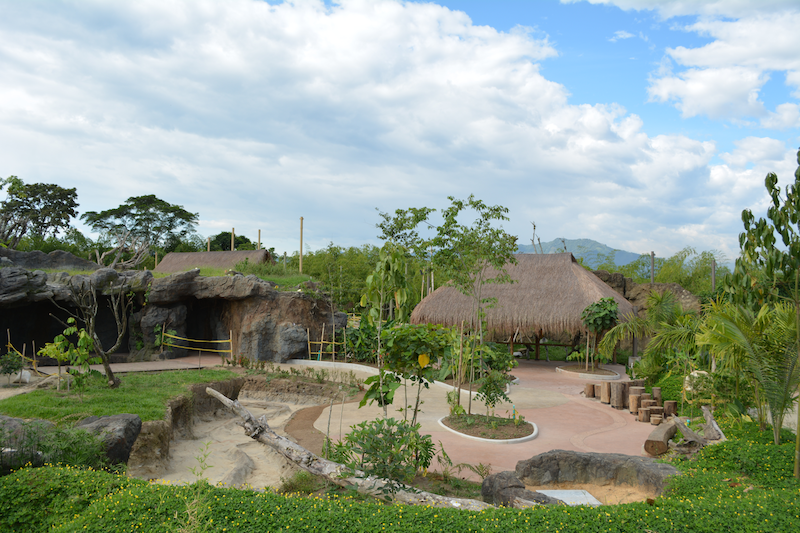
Ukumari Biopark

The biopark is an educational and conservation proposal for Colombia and the world, created with the idea of "the animal and its surroundings", with the intention of breaking the stereotypes of Victorian zoos with prisonlike animal enclosures. The Ukumari Bioparc opened its doors on June 30, 2015, the last day of June began the official transfer of animals from the Matecaña zoo (recently closed) to the forests of Ukumarí. It initially offered only an Andean forest bioregion exhibit, representing home to 69% of Colombia's birds. Additionally, there would be six other bioregions, three with exotic animals from Africa and Asia, and four other bio-regions of the Colombian territory.

For the beginning phase of the transfer of animals to the biopark, and the inauguration of the Andean Forest bioregion, 80 billion pesos were invested, divided between the national government, the Ministry of Industry, Commerce, and Tourism, and the INFIPEREIRA. Purchase of the biopark land and construction cost 30 billion pesos.

Ukumarí is expected to become an area for increased development and tourism in the region. As previous administrations of Pereira have remarked repeatedly, this project will complement the Coffee Axis and, along with Matecaña International Airport, be a new point of pride for 'the querendona, trasnochadora and morena'.

=== Places of interest ===
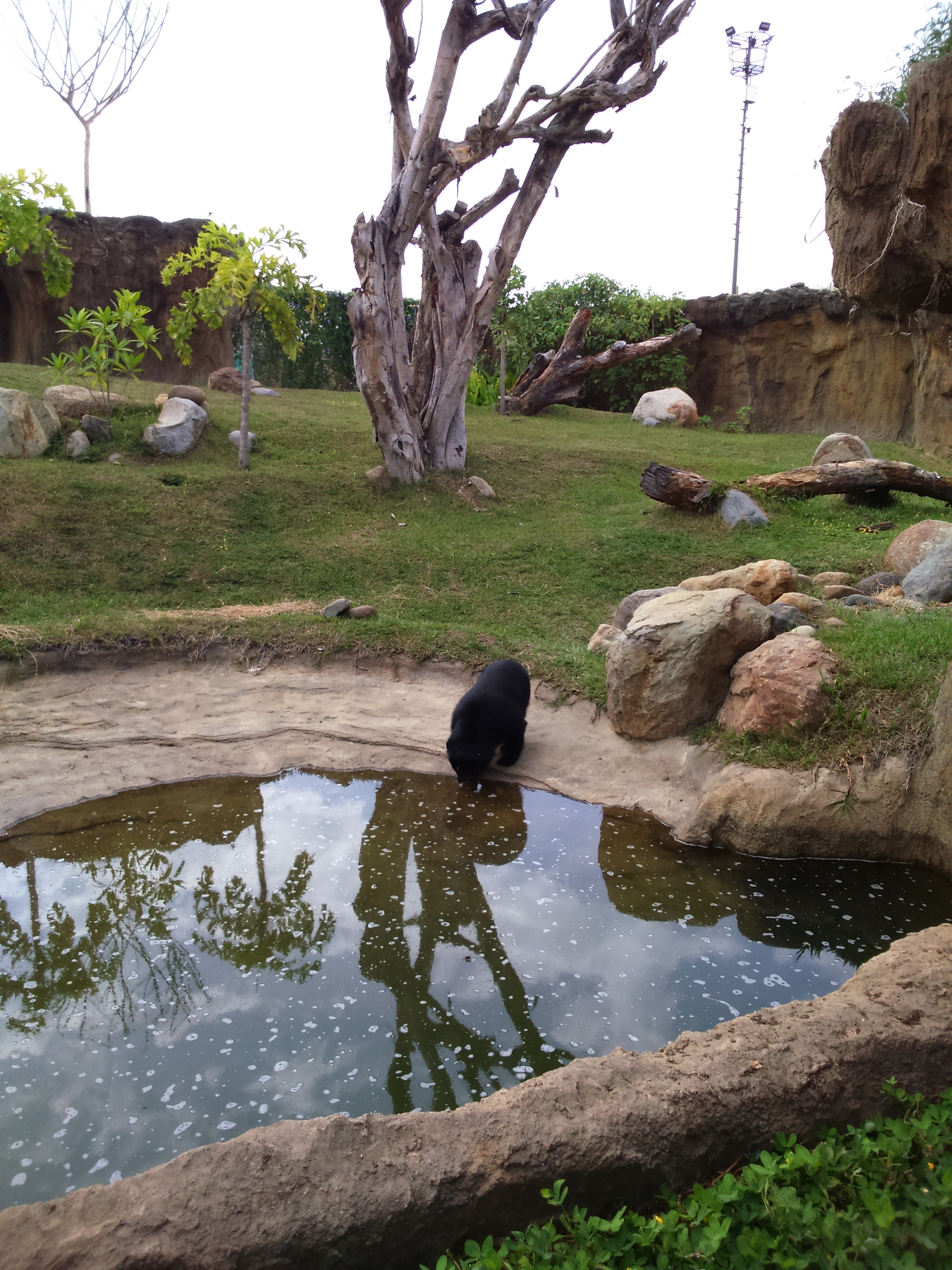
Bears at the Ukumarí Biopark.

- Technological University of Pereira, (planetarium and botanical garden of Pereira Technological University and Guaducto, a bamboo bridge).
- Cathedral of Our Lady of Poverty.
- Lucy Tejada, cultural centre and museum.
- Pereira Museum of Art
- Jaime Mejia archaeological museum
- Sanctuary of Our Lady of Fatima.
- Consota Recreational Park: Noah's farm eco-park, water park
- Olympic venues: village, pools, tennis courts, basketball courts and velodrome.
- Los Nevados National Natural Park
- Botanical Garden of Marsella
- Plaza de Bolívar and the naked Bolívar statue.
- Circunvalar Avenue, high end shopping boulevard
- Victoria's City Square
- Parque Arboleda Shopping mall
- Unicentro, the largest mall in the Coffee Axis
- Santiago Londoño Londoño Municipal Theater
- Viaducto César Gaviria Trujillo
- Laguna del Otún
- Catedral Nuestra Señora de la Pobreza

=== Monuments ===
- Monument to the founders, Rodrigo Arenas Betancur
- Prometheus bound, Universidad Tecnológica de Pereira, Rodrigo Arenas Betancur.
- Christ without the cross, Our Lady of Fatima church, Rodrigo Arenas Betancur.
- The Rebecca, Circunvalar park, Cardigan Ave., Larry Mendez.
- Train: monument of transport", transportation terminal.
- Alexandra Ariza, Jorge Eliecer Gaitan park, opposite the St. George hospital, Jorge Eliecer Gaitan
- The Obelisk, Hernando Hoyos.
- Diana of the Gavi and the young of Jar.
- General Rafael Uribe Uribe, Franco A. Cano.
- The Traveler, Antonio Segui.

== Architecture ==
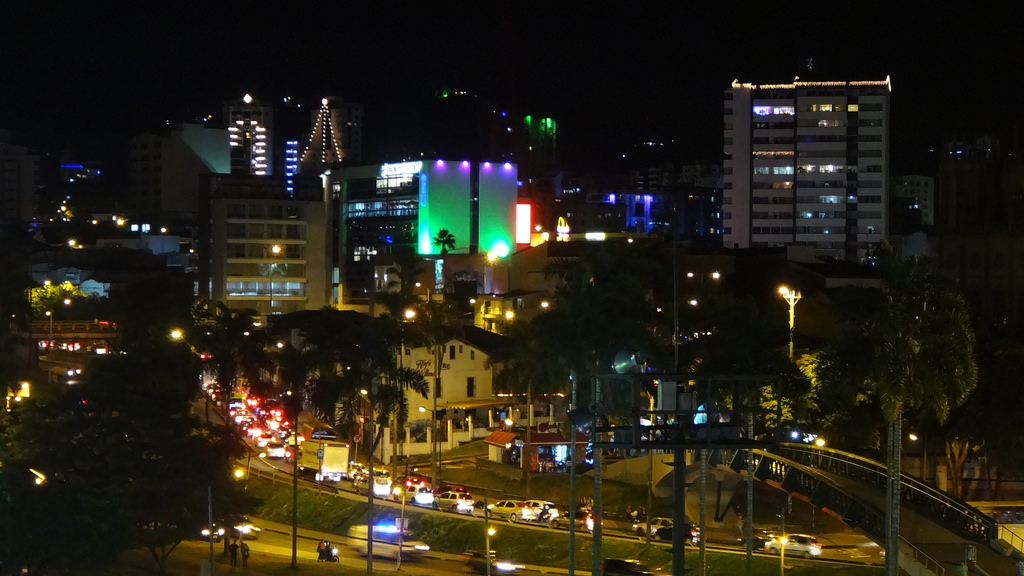
City Center at night

In the city center the skyline is dominated by the republican style of low-rise buildings. In the Ciudad Victoria, there are buildings both in the modern and less numerous colonial styles.

The reconstruction of the old gallery sector is the largest social and economic renewal project in the city. Since the early 1980s there were calls in Pereira for urban renewal in this deteriorated area. This resulted in the development of what is now Ciudad Victoria, which has varied public spaces, among which is the Plaza de Bolivar. Located opposite the Cathedral of Our Lady of Poverty, it is famous for its Naked Bolivar monument. The area is the main center of commercial and financial activities of the city, as well as a meeting place for its inhabitants.

Other notable landmarks include the Lucy Tejada Cultural Center, located at the site of the central gallery, where the Cultural Institute of Pereira is located, the Issuer "Remigio Antonio Cañarte", the Pereira Air station, the Municipal Library, Exhibition Hall, and the headquarters of the Academy of History, Between Ciudad Victoria and the Avenue Circunvalar there is a flyover bridge that connects the two areas, with both pedestrian and bicycle lanes.

The most important venue for concerts, artistic performances, and core of the cultural life in Pereira, is the Teatro Municipal Santiago Londoño, which pays tribute to one of its most prominent patrons. The city also has the Library and Exhibition Centre, Bank of the Republic, and the Museum of Modern Art, the latter with modern exhibition halls and an auditorium.

Victoria has the Egoyá Linear Park between streets 14 and 18, with 0.6 ha of parkland. Its name comes from the Egoyá channel, running through the center of the city but now mostly underground. Many major events and festivals take place at the Civic Victoria Plaza.

Among the most representative monuments of the city are:

- Naked Bolivar: Rodrigo Arenas Betancourt. Bolivar plaza.
- Monument to the Founders: Rodrigo Arenas Betancourt. Carrera 13 with Calle 12.
- Chained Prometheus: Rodrigo Arenas Betancourt. Technological University of Pereira.
- Without Christ Cross: Rodrigo Arenas Betancourt. Church of Our Lady of Fatima.
- Rebeca: Leonidas Mendez. Park Avenue Cardigan Circunvalar.
- Railway: Monument to Transport. Waterfront Transport Terminal.
- Jorge Eliecer Gaitan: Alexandra Ariza. Jorge Eliecer Gaitan Park, opposite the San Jorge Hospital.
- The Obelisk: Hernando Hoyos. Calle 17 with carrera 6.
- General Rafael Uribe Uribe: A. Franco Cano. Park Lake.
- The Traveler: Antonio Segui. August 30 avenue, roundabout Cuba.

== Transportation ==
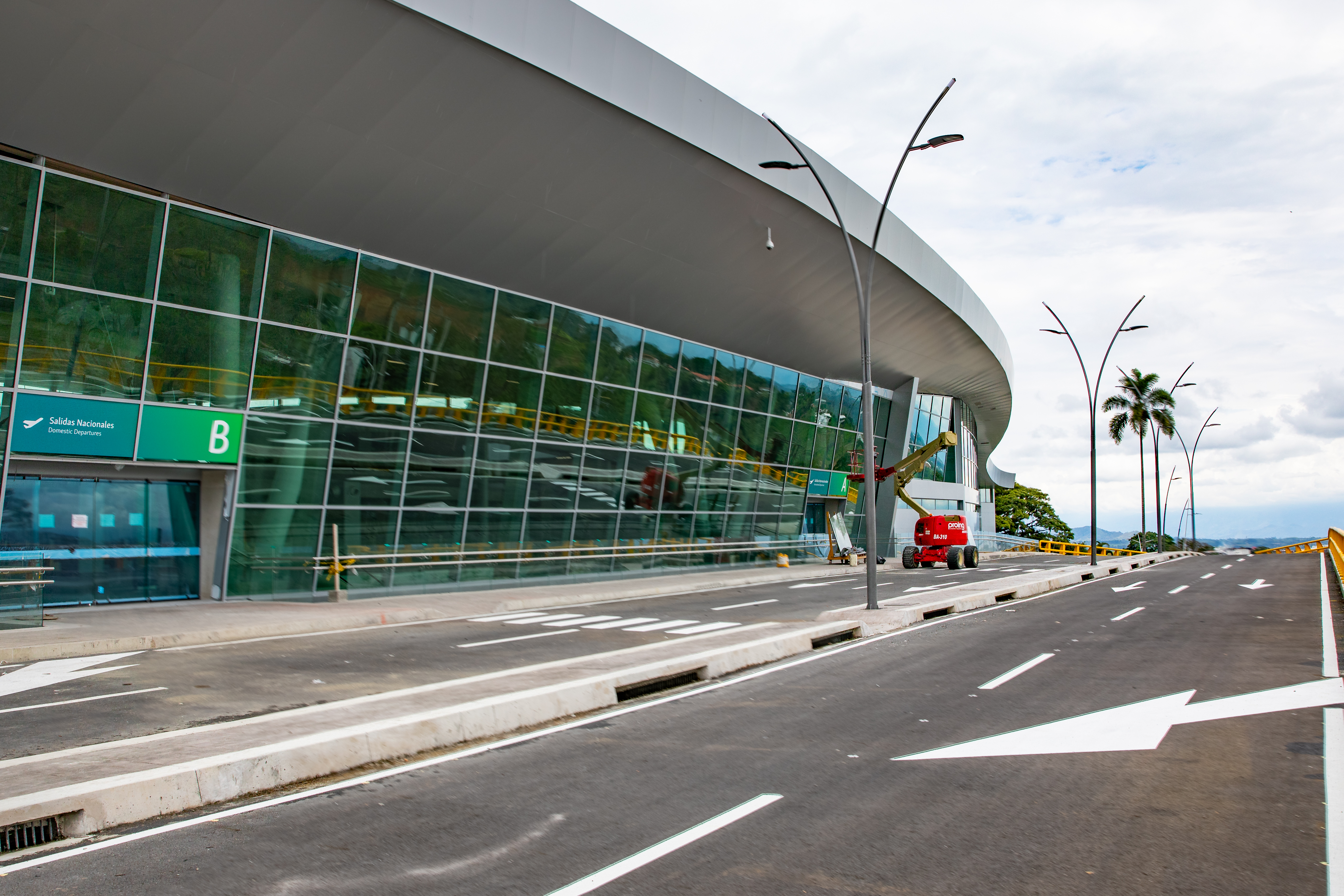
Matecaña International Airport

=== Airport ===
Pereira's airport is the Matecaña International Airport. It was built between 1944 and 1946 and opened in August 1947. It operates both nationally and internationally. It is currently undergoing an expansion which will include a new control tower, a longer runway, new access roads, and new destinations such as New York, which will make Matecaña International Airport one of the most important in the country. In 2016, the airport launched the tendering process for the construction of the new terminal building. Both runway expansions and the new control tower were completed. With the city zoo moving out of Matecaña to the new Biopark Ukumari, these lands have been given to the airport to use for expansion of its access roads and an office and hotel complex.

=== Road ===
Pereira is at the center of the transport hub for Caldas, Risaralda, and Quindio. Autopista del Café are the highways which connect Armenia, Manizales, Pereira and Cartago. Other main urban highways include August 30 Avenue, Circunvalar Avenue, The Americas Avenue, Railway Avenue, Belalcazár Avenue, River Avenue, and Sixth, Seventh and Eighth Streets. Pereira's street system is aligned on a grid, with numbers for carreras going up from the River Otun, and street numbers going up from the neighbourhood of Alfonso Lopez. Beyond Alfonso Lopez, the streets become affixed with a letter E to denote East; for example, the Kennedy neighbourhood is completely composed of streets like Street 7E, Street 10E and so on.

=== SITM or Mass Public Transport ===
Pereira is currently undergoing a transitional phase, in which the traditional bus networks of the city are replaced completely by a mass public transportation system including a cable car system.

==== Urban Bus ====
A bus system which has almost 50 routes in the city is soon to be replaced. It has a cost of $3.600 which is paid directly to the driver in cash.

==== Megacable ====
Megacable is the gondola lift system implementing one of three proposed cable car lines across the city as part of the new transit development plan. The Mexican transportation consultants Transconsult investigated the most viable routes and locations for the network. It was announced that final routes would be from Industrial Park (Parque industrial) to the airport, Villa Santana to the UTP University, and Villa Verde to the city center. Construction on the first line was scheduled to commence at the end of 2017 or the beginning of 2018. The first line was built between the Olaya Park and Villa Santana, connecting with the Transport Terminal and the university; it is the longest urban cable car in Colombia. In March 2017, the local government began the design studies, construction began in 2018 and it was opened in 2021.

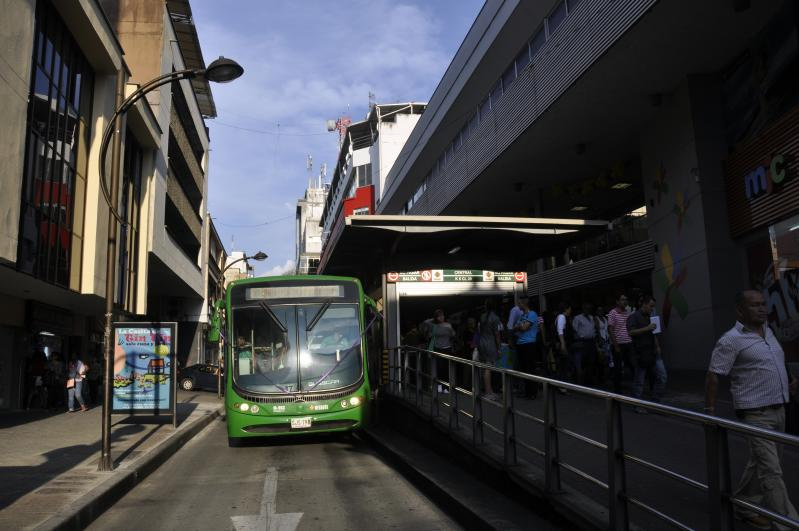
Megabús in the city center

==== Megabús ====
Megabús is the mass transport system, which was founded in 2006. It comprises 3 trunk routes that link Dosquebradas and Cuba, and feeder routes which connect the rest of the metropolitan area including La Virginia, Puerto Caldas, Cerritos, Morelia, and many other neighbourhoods, which connect with the trunk routes at Interchanger stations. Since 2016, Megabus has embarked on the task of connecting the entire city, with new routes to important areas of the city that previously lacked a Megabus route. One of these new routes is to the UTP University, via The Américas Avenue and the Transport Station.

==== Cesar Gaviria Trujillo Viaduct ====
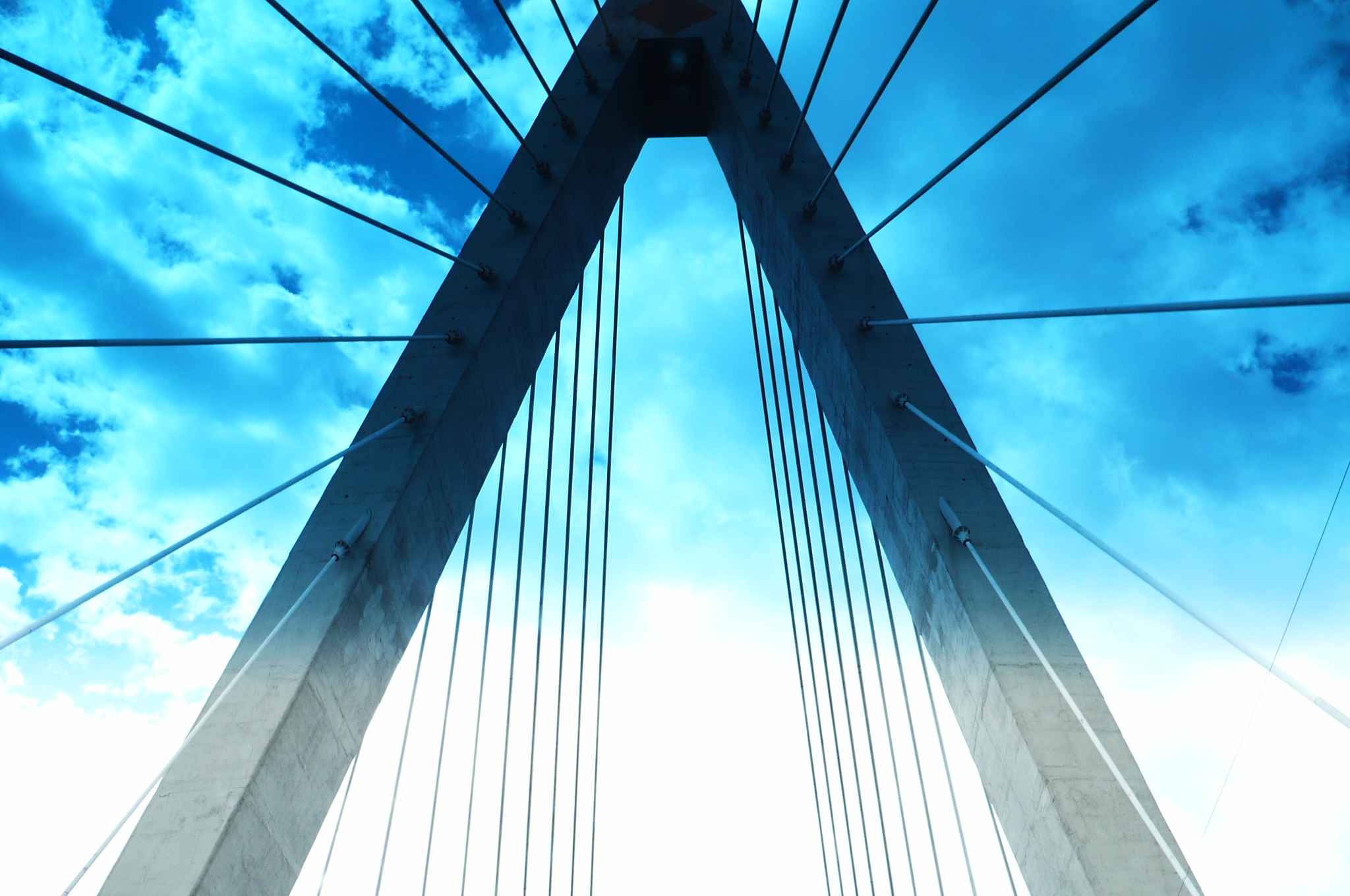
Pilares del Viaducto César Gaviria Trujillo.

The architectural award-winning César Gaviria Trujillo Viaduct, a cable-stayed bridge, was opened on November 15, 1997. It is named after César Gaviria, the 40th president of Colombia, who was born in the city of Pereira. The viaduct links Pereira with Dosquebradas and the cities of Armenia and Manizales. The length of its centre span is 211 metres (692 ft), one of the longest in South America.

== Climate ==
Pereira has a subropical rainforest climate (Köppen Af) although its altitude is sufficient to make its afternoon temperatures cooler rather than hot. The average temperature is 21.5 °C or 70.7 °F, and the annual average rainfall is 2,425 millimetres or 95 inches. There is a large degree of biodiversity in the region.

Climate data for Pereira, Colombia (Matecaña International Airport) 1981-2010
Month	Jan	Feb	Mar	Apr	May	Jun	Jul	Aug	Sep	Oct	Nov	Dec	Year
Record high °C (°F)	35.5 (95.9)	37.0 (98.6)	36.0 (96.8)	36.0 (96.8)	33.5 (92.3)	34.0 (93.2)	33.5 (92.3)	37.0 (98.6)	36.8 (98.2)	36.2 (97.2)	34.0 (93.2)	36.0 (96.8)	37.0 (98.6)
Mean daily maximum °C (°F)	26.8 (80.2)	27.1 (80.8)	26.9 (80.4)	26.2 (79.2)	25.9 (78.6)	26.0 (78.8)	26.5 (79.7)	26.9 (80.4)	26.4 (79.5)	25.8 (78.4)	25.6 (78.1)	26.0 (78.8)	26.3 (79.3)
Daily mean °C (°F)	21.8 (71.2)	22.0 (71.6)	21.9 (71.4)	21.5 (70.7)	21.4 (70.5)	21.5 (70.7)	21.7 (71.1)	22.0 (71.6)	21.5 (70.7)	20.9 (69.6)	20.9 (69.6)	21.4 (70.5)	21.5 (70.7)
Mean daily minimum °C (°F)	17.4 (63.3)	17.5 (63.5)	17.6 (63.7)	17.6 (63.7)	17.6 (63.7)	17.4 (63.3)	17.2 (63.0)	17.2 (63.0)	17.1 (62.8)	17.0 (62.6)	17.2 (63.0)	17.4 (63.3)	17.4 (63.3)
Record low °C (°F)	11.0 (51.8)	10.0 (50.0)	11.0 (51.8)	11.0 (51.8)	10.0 (50.0)	10.0 (50.0)	11.0 (51.8)	10.0 (50.0)	10.0 (50.0)	10.0 (50.0)	10.0 (50.0)	10.0 (50.0)	10.0 (50.0)
Average rainfall mm (inches)	132.7 (5.22)	132.6 (5.22)	220.2 (8.67)	249.3 (9.81)	257.4 (10.13)	196.1 (7.72)	133.5 (5.26)	129.0 (5.08)	195.9 (7.71)	290.5 (11.44)	287.9 (11.33)	199.4 (7.85)	2,424.5 (95.44)
Average rainy days (≥ 1 mm)	16	15	20	23	24	21	20	18	21	24	23	20	245
Average relative humidity (%)	75	74	76	79	79	78	75	74	76	79	79	77	77
Mean monthly sunshine hours	186.0	161.0	155.0	132.0	139.5	147.0	182.9	182.9	150.0	142.6	150.0	167.4	1,896.3
Mean daily sunshine hours	6.0	5.7	5.0	4.4	4.5	4.9	5.9	5.9	5.0	4.6	5.0	5.4	5.2
Source: Instituto de Hidrologia Meteorologia y Estudios Ambientales

== Education ==
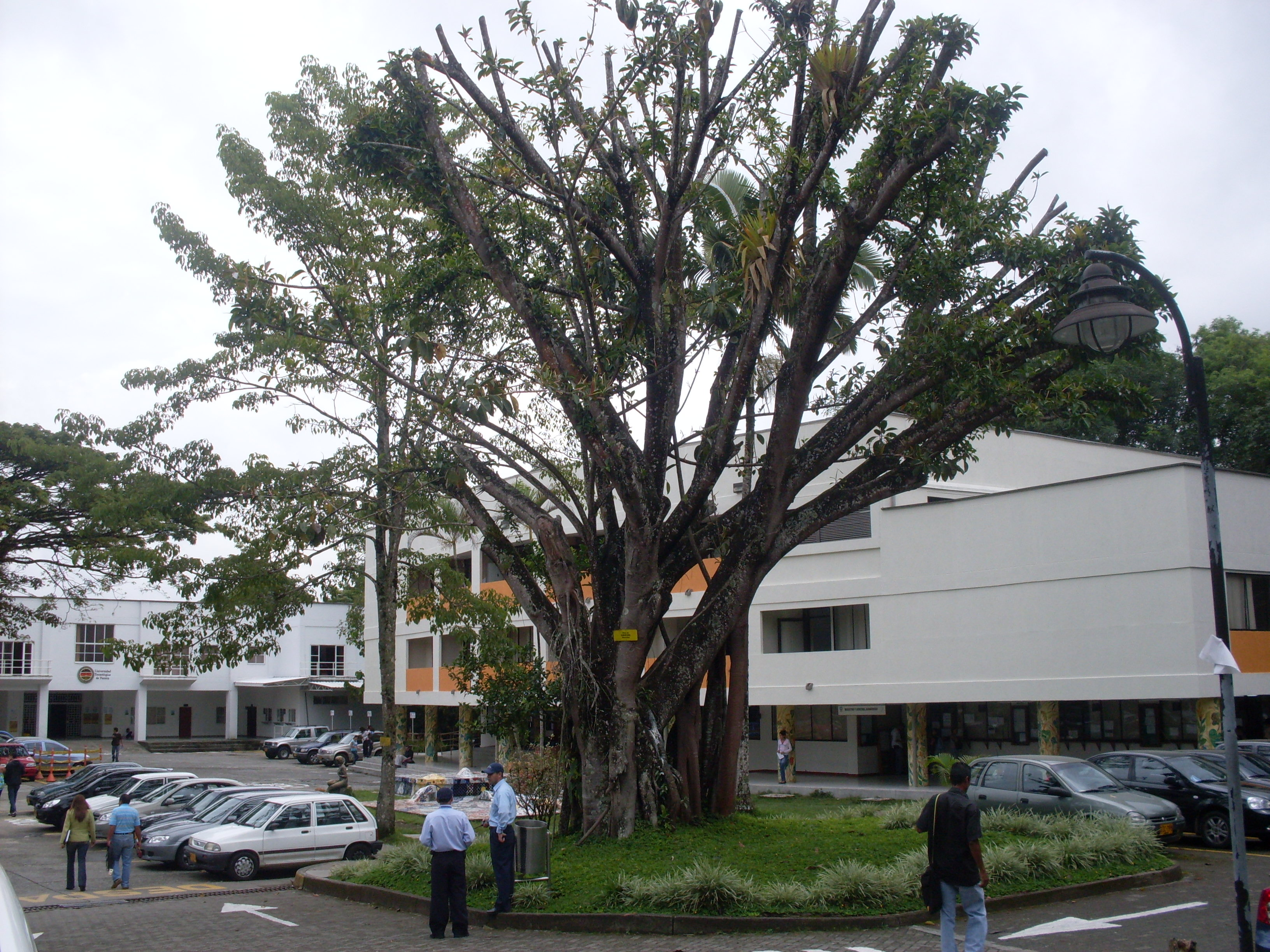
Educational computer resource center (CRIE) in the Universidad Tecnológica de Pereira.

Places of learning in Pereira include:

- Technological University of Pereira
- Universidad Católica de Pereira
- Free University of Colombia
- Andina University
- Cooperative University of Colombia
- National University of Colombia distance learning campus
- Saint Thomas Aquinas University campus
- CEIPA University
- Antonio Nariño University
- Autonomous University of the Americas.

Pereira also has a number of training institutions associated with the National Learning Service (SENA).

== Harvest Festival ==
The Harvest Festival (Spanish: Fiesta de la Cosecha) is celebrated on the anniversary of the founding of the city. It is usually also the month that coffee crops are collected, giving rise to the phrase "hicieron su Agosto" ("they made their August"), meaning that someone made good money, referring to the pay that coffee collectors earned in August.

== Sports ==
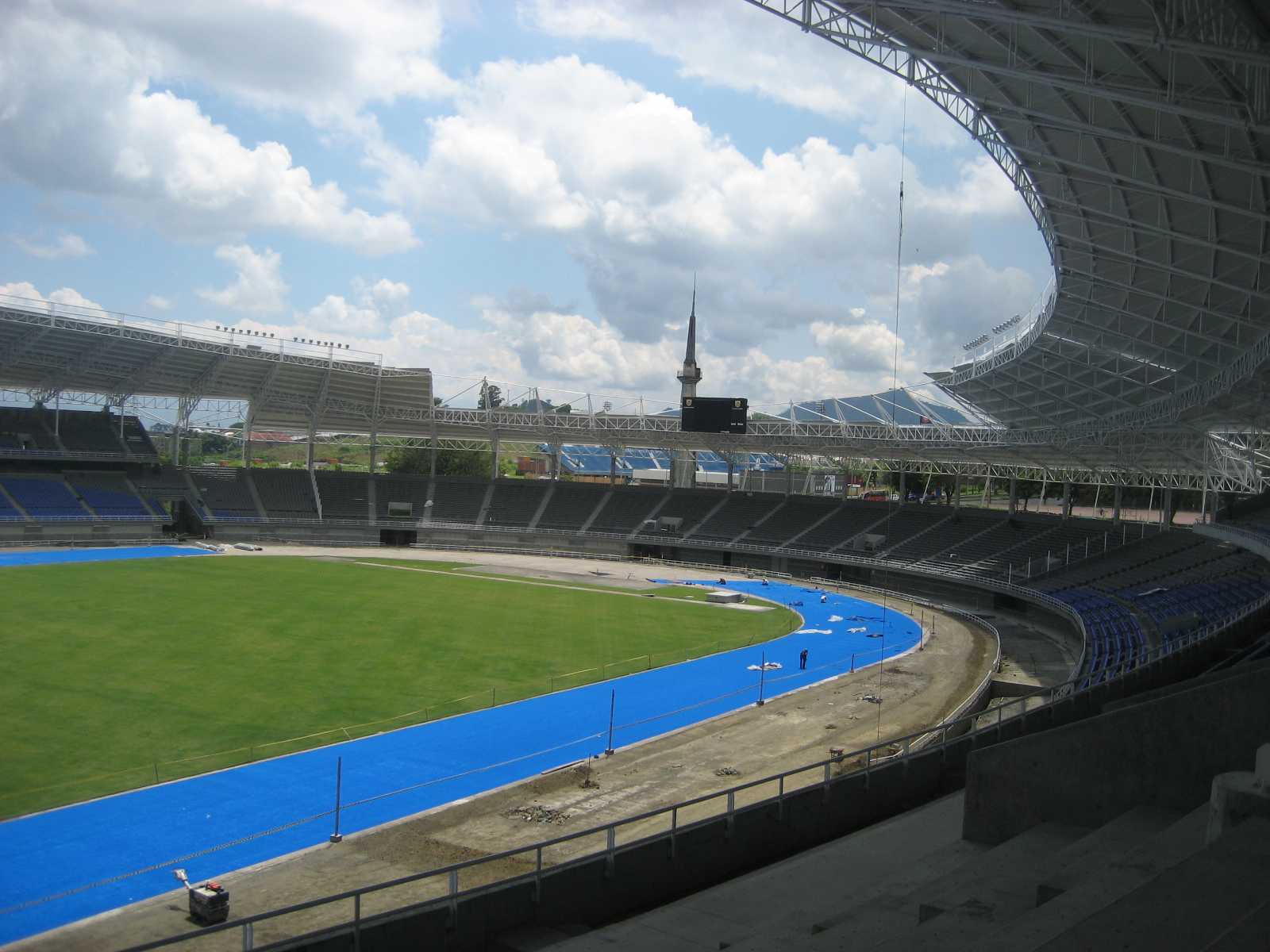
Hernán Ramírez Villegas Stadium

Pereira houses the biggest Olympic Village in the Western part of the Country, with the recently renovated Stadium Hernan Ramirez Villegas, the Velodrome, the Olympic swimming pools, the multiple tennis and synthetic football fields, and the biggest Skate Park in the Country. It also has other venues like the Commerce Club.

Pereira has achieved the title of the most active city in Colombia in 2015, with important programs such as the Cycle way every Sunday, in which the city closes its most important avenue to give way for people riding a bike, running or walking. Also every neighbourhood in the city has an Open Air gym open to the public.

Pereira's main football team is the Deportivo Pereira, which plays in the Categoría Primera A. The city hosts the Hernán Ramírez Villegas Stadium, a velodrome, a skating area, an Olympic swimming pool and a motocross track. Pereira is also home to the "coffee marathon". Pereira is the birthplace of the Colombian tennis player, Santiago Giraldo, and soccer player Cucho Hernández.

== Religion ==
The predominant religion is Catholicism.

== Twin towns – sister cities ==
Pereira is twinned with:

- Miami-Dade County, United States

== Gastronomy ==
Pereira's gastronomy as well as being part of the Coffee Axis, it is also known for paisa culture. Therefore, the main dishes are influenced by the paisa culture and by regions near to it. Main dishes include the Sancocho soup made with chicken and beef, with potato, yuca, corn, sweet plantain and rice. Another main dish is the bandeja paisa, which has beans with rice, fried sweet plantains, avocado, fried eggs, sausages, and meat. Mazamorra is another typical dish that is served as dessert, made of smashed corn with milk, with sweet unprocessed sugar added.

In addition, Pereira is also known for its varieties of pineapple, honey, and small biscuits called panderos, which are made of unprocessed sugar cane.

== Flag ==
The flag of Pereira consists of a yellow isosceles triangle based on the hoist side, spread through the whole length of the flag, over a red field. Inside the triangle is a vertical stick, passing through the triangle's geometric center, and topped by a Phrygian cap (Spanish: Gorro Frigio).

== Notable persons ==
=== Miss Universe ===
Luz Marina Zuluaga, Miss Universe 1958.

== Gallery ==
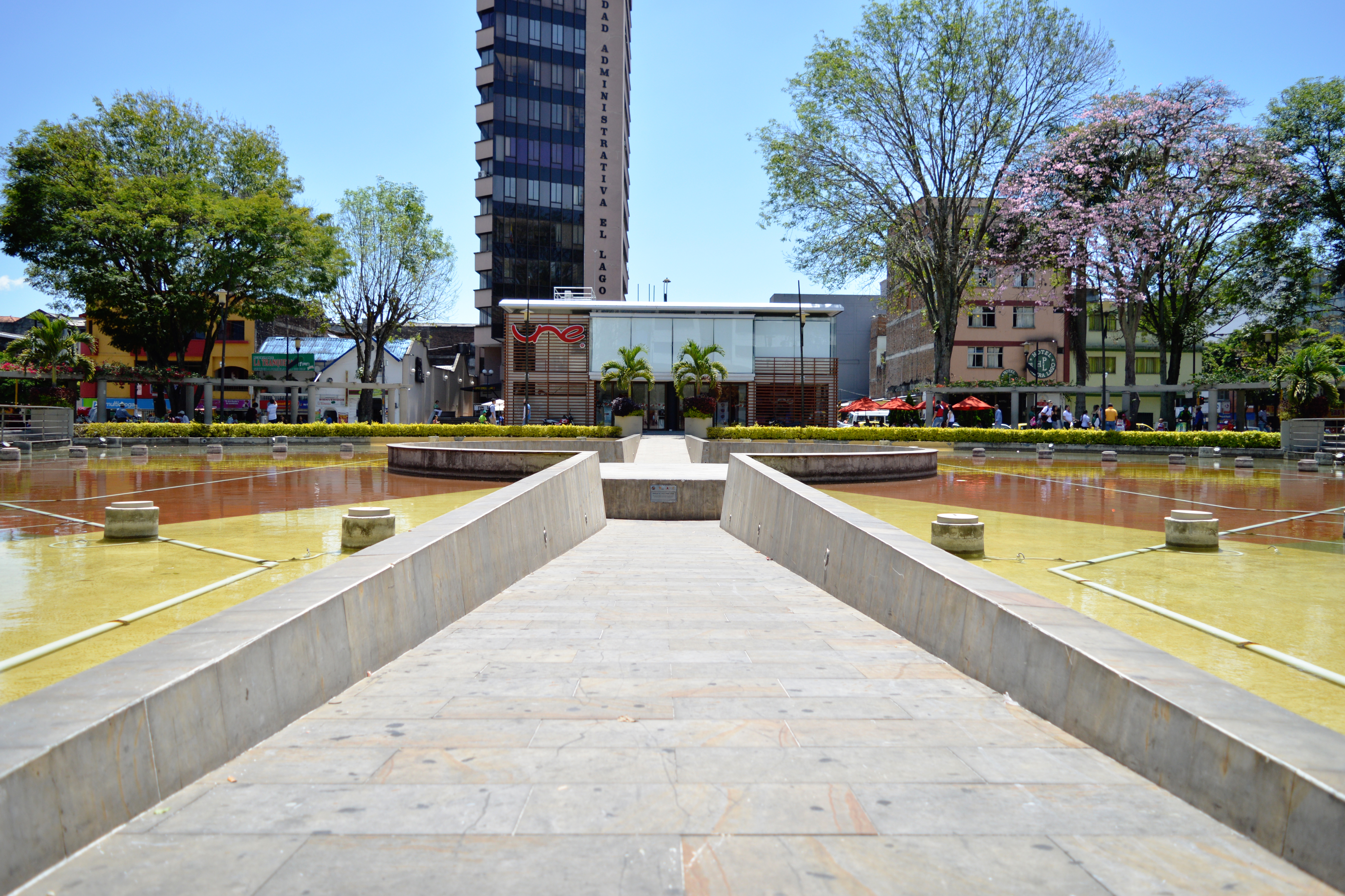
El Lago Uribe Uribe Park

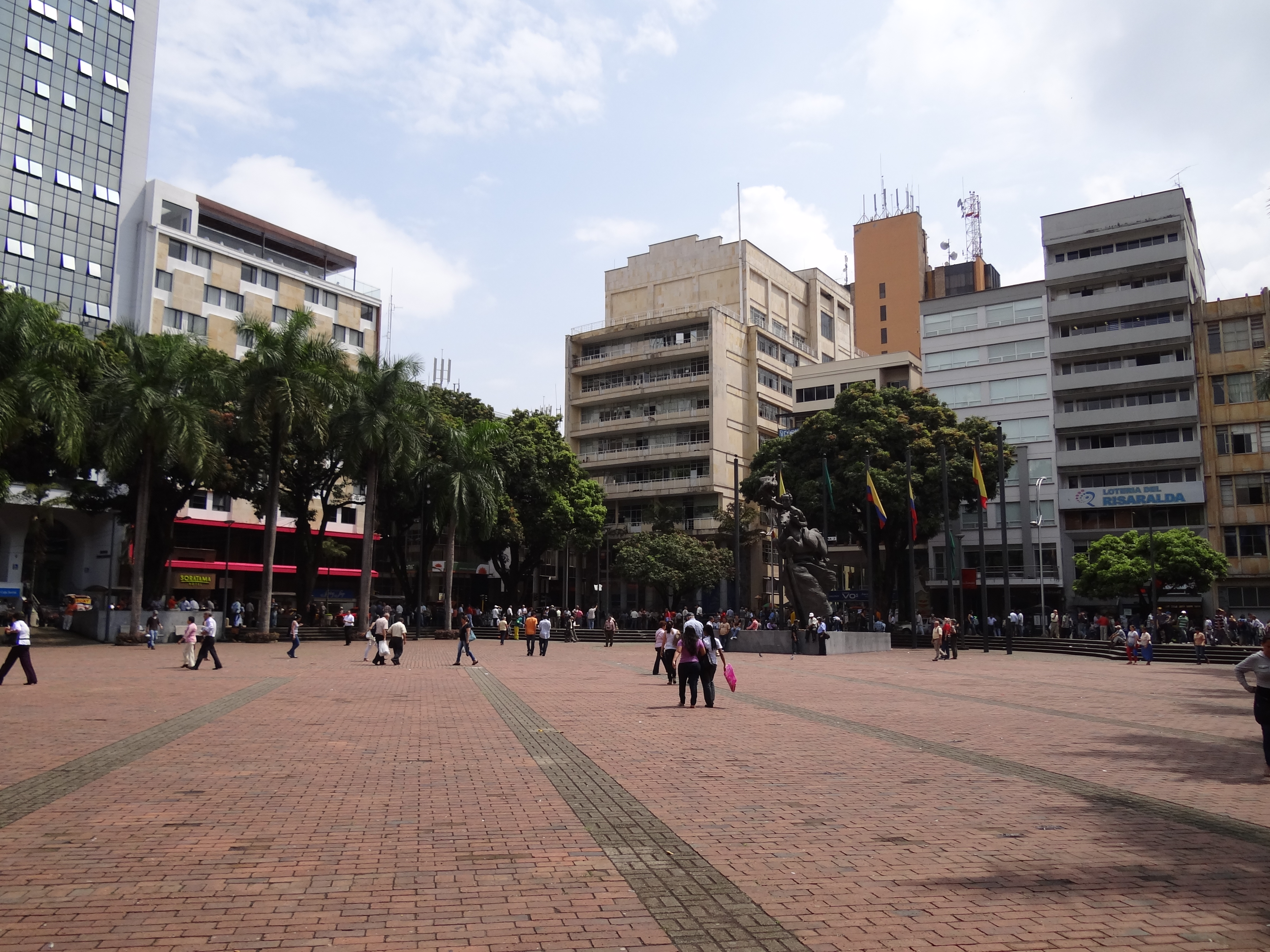
Bolívar Plaza

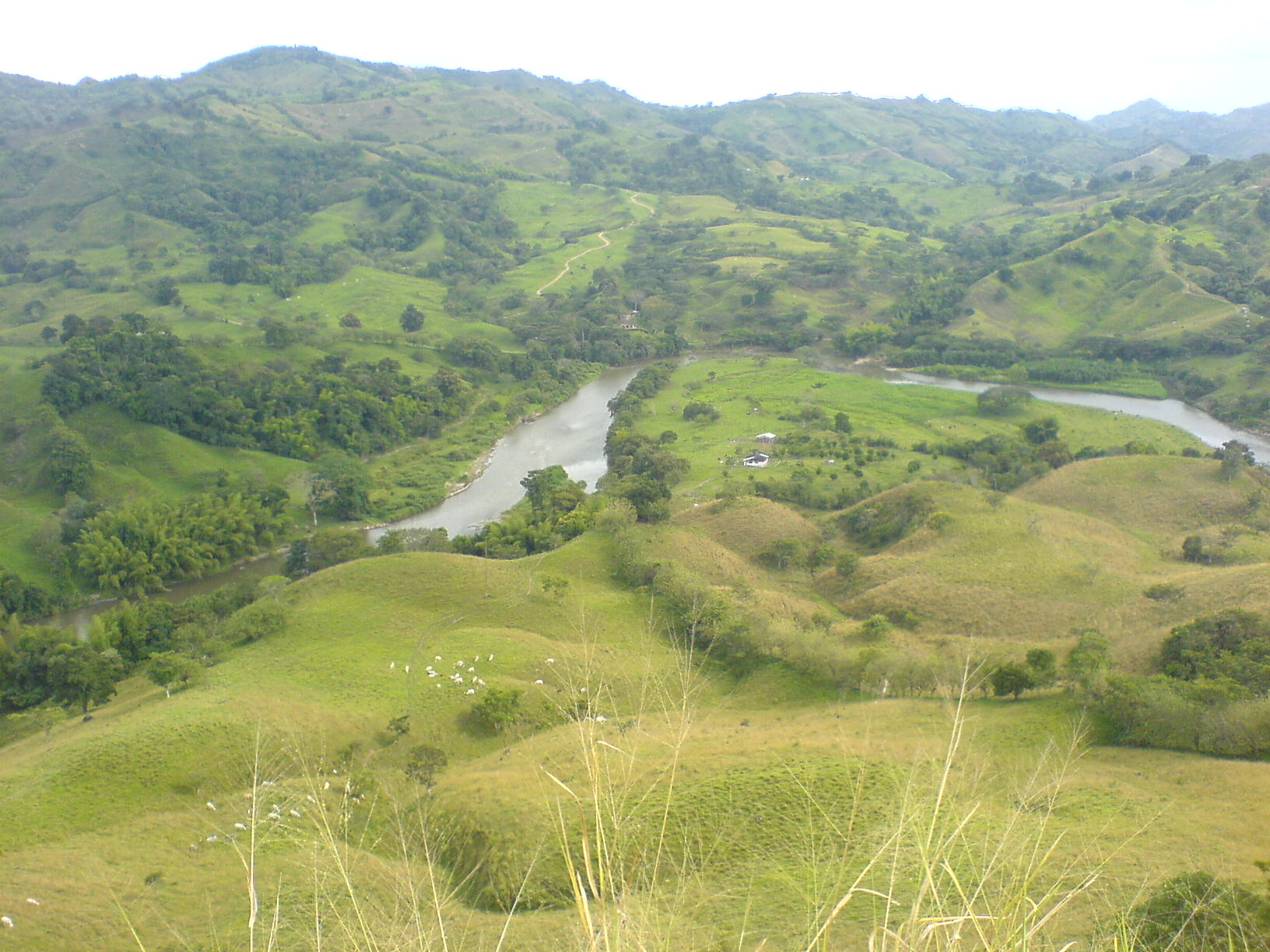
Rio de La Vieja (Old Lady River)

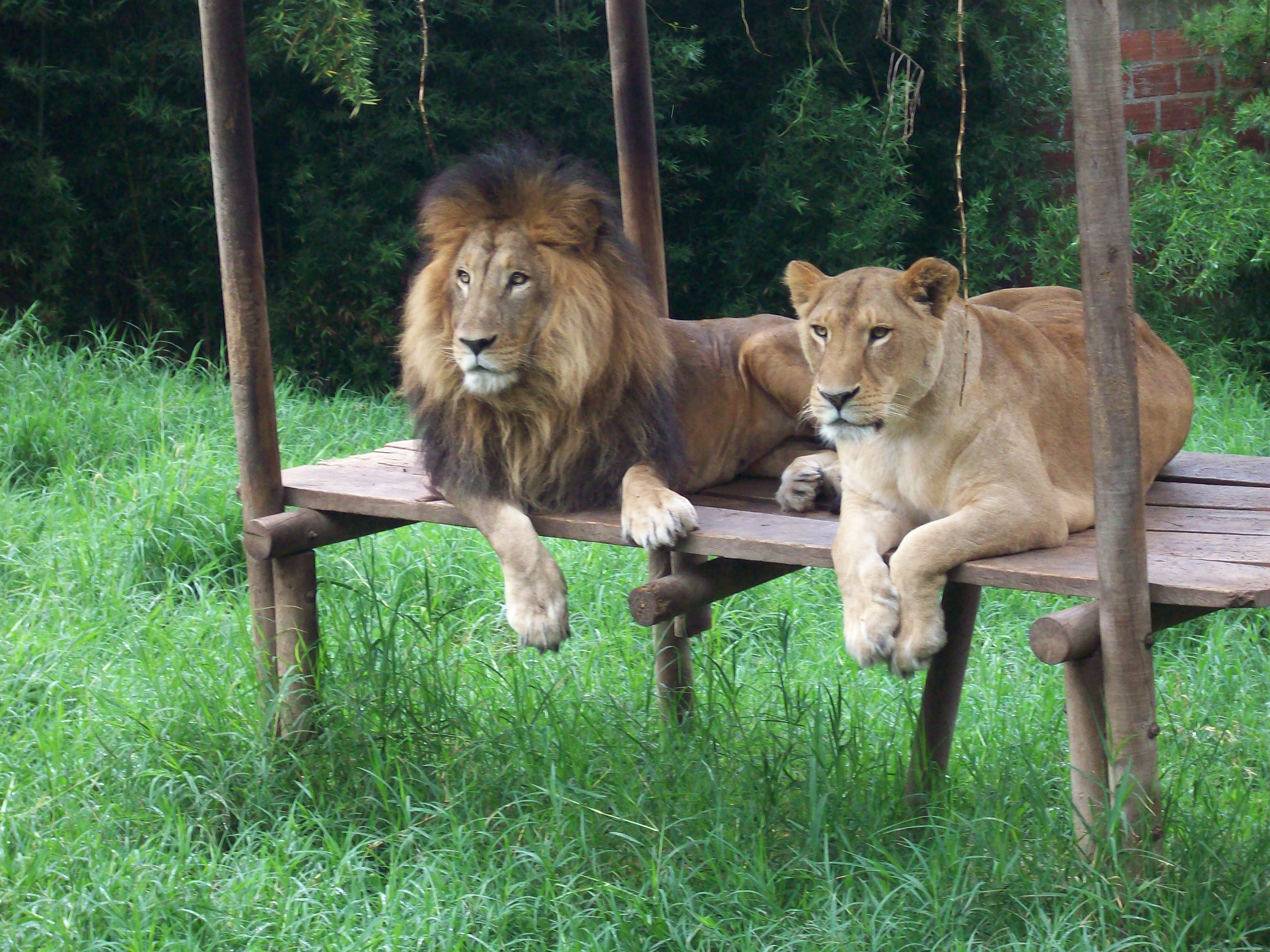
Lions from the Matecaña Zoo

== See also ==
- 1999 Armenia earthquake
- 2026 Colombia earthquake
- César Gaviria Trujillo Viaduct
- Matecaña City Zoo
- Technological University of Pereira
- Deportivo Pereira
- Lucrecia Dalt
