= Dosquebradas =

- Municipality and town
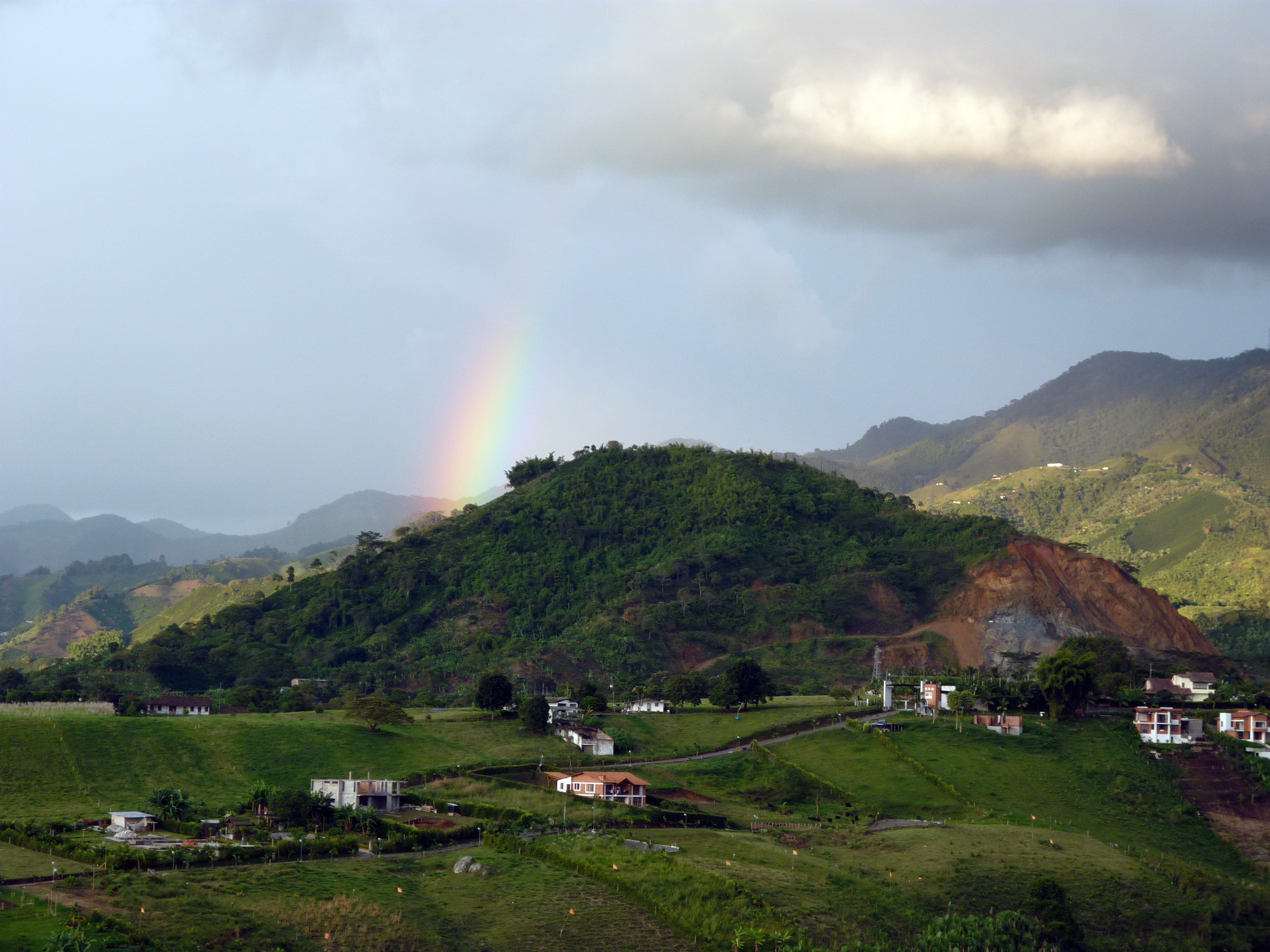

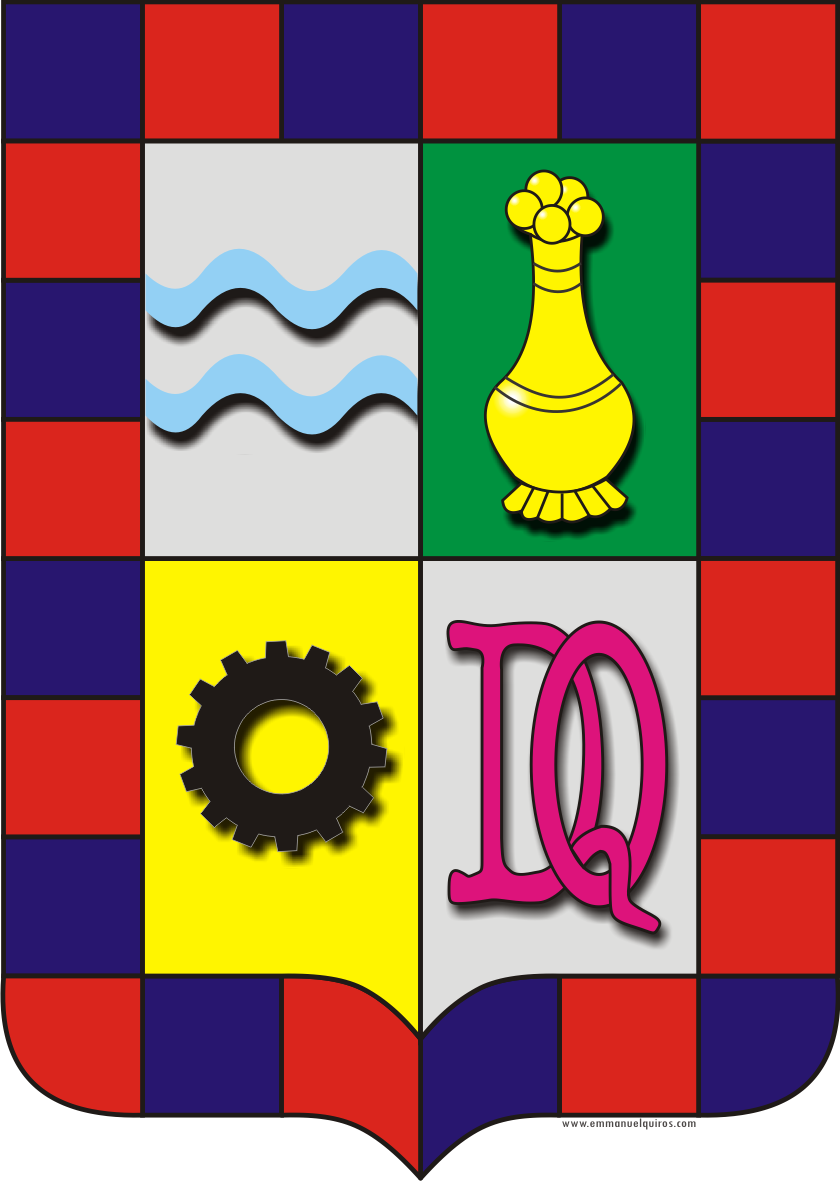
- Flag Coat of arms

- Location of the municipality and town of Dosquebradas in the Risaralda Department of Colombia.

- Location in Colombia
- Coordinates: 4°50′N 75°41′W
- Country: Colombia
- Department: Risaralda Department

Government
  - Mayor: Jorge Ramos Diego

Area
  - Total: 2,705.8 km^{2} (1,044.7 sq mi)
- Elevation: 1,460 m (4,790 ft)

Population (2023)
  - Total: 225,540
  - Density: 83.354/km^{2} (215.89/sq mi)
- Demonym: Dosquebradenses
- Time zone: UTC-5 (Colombia Standard Time)
- Area code: 57 + 6
- Website: Official website (in Spanish)

Dosquebradas (Spanish pronunciation: [doskeˈβɾaðas]) is the second largest city and a municipality in the Risaralda Department, Colombia. As of 2023, with a population of approximately 225,540 inhabitants. The city is connected by the César Gaviria Trujillo Viaduct to Pereira, the capital of the department.

== History ==
The name of the city literally means "two creeks" (dos quebradas), Santa Teresita and Las Garzas. Dosquebradas is sometimes called the Pink Zone (Zona Rosa) of Pereira because it has many nightclubs and bars, which are filled with young people on the weekends.

It grew up as an industrial center serving Pereira in the 1970s and 1980s. With the construction of El Poblado neighborhood (low-income housing) it experienced a population boom, providing residence to many families that commuted to Pereira for work.

== Climate ==
Dosquebradas has a subtropical highland climate with an average annual temperature of 21°C.

== Education ==
The education in the city is one of the best in Risaralda department, and almost all the schools state-owned, only 4 are private schools, 3 of those schools are Catholic schools. Some of the most notable schools in Dosquebradas are:

1. Salesian School San Juan Bosco (private, Catholic)
2. Agustin Nieto Caballero School
3. Diocesan School Baltasar Alvares R
4. Cristo Rey School (private, Catholic)
5. Salesians Femels María Auxiliadora (private, Catholic)
