= TAME Flight 120 =

2002 plane crash near Ipiales, Colombia

- A section of the destroyed aircraft

Accident
- Date: January 28, 2002; 24 years ago
- Summary: Controlled flight into terrain, navigation error
- Site: Cumbal Volcano, Colombia; 0.949°N 77.888°W

Aircraft
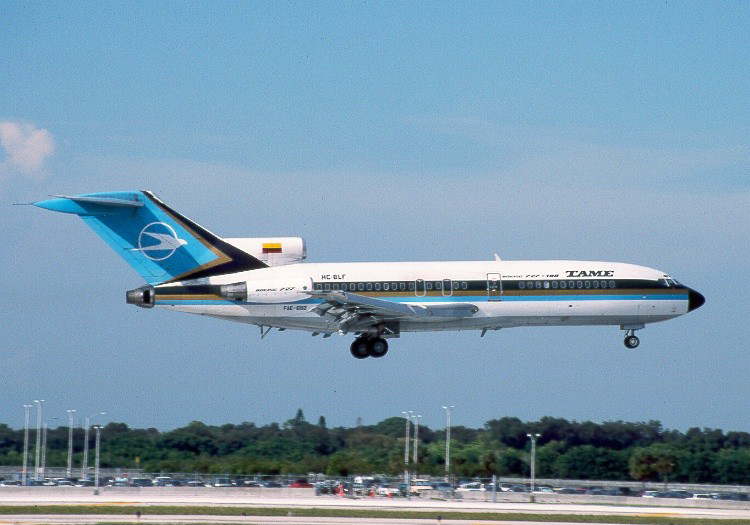
- HC-BLF, the aircraft involved in the accident in 1998
- Aircraft type: Boeing 727-134
- Aircraft name: El Oro
- Operator: TAME
- IATA flight No.: EQ120
- ICAO flight No.: TAE120
- Call sign: TAME 120
- Registration: HC-BLF
- Flight origin: Mariscal Sucre International Airport
- Stopover: Teniente Coronel Luis A. Mantilla International Airport
- Destination: Alfonso Bonilla Aragón International Airport
- Occupants: 94
- Passengers: 87
- Crew: 7
- Fatalities: 94
- Survivors: 0

TAME Flight 120 was a Boeing 727-134 airliner, registration HC-BLF, named El Oro, operating as a scheduled international passenger flight between Quito, Ecuador and Cali, Colombia, with a scheduled stopover at the Ecuadorian border town of Tulcán. The aircraft crashed while on approach to Tulcán's Teniente Coronel Luis A. Mantilla International Airport on January 28, 2002. The pilot flew the approach incorrectly in reportedly foggy conditions, and the aircraft crashed into the side of the Cumbal Volcano, located near Ipiales, Colombia, at 10:23 in the morning. All 94 passengers and crew were killed in the crash.

== Aircraft and crew ==
The aircraft involved had first flown in 1967 and was registered to TAME in February 1985.

The captain was 59-year-old Jorge Efrain Noe, one of TAME's flight instructors and most experienced pilots, having logged a total of 12,091 flight hours, including 8,263 hours on the Boeing 727. The first officer was 52-year-old Carlos Alfonso Lopez, who was undergoing training to become a captain. He had 7,058 flight hours with 3,457 of them on the Boeing 727. The flight engineer was 50-year-old Jorge Anibal Burgos Villamar, who had 4,200 flight hours including 3,000 hours on the Boeing 727.

First officer Lopez was the pilot flying on the accident flight and occupied the left seat, while captain Noe occupied the right seat and acted as pilot-in-command.

== Flight chronology ==
The Boeing 727-100 departed Quito at 10:03 local time, taking off from Runway 17. The aircraft climbed to a cruising altitude of 18,000 feet (5,500 m) and proceeded north-north-east along the G-675 airway. The first leg, between Quito and Tulcán, was a short one. At 10:15 HC-BLF made contact with the Tulcán control tower, at which point it was positioned 29 miles (25 nmi; 47 km) from the Tulcán NDB. The crew were given permission to descend to 14,000 feet (4,300 m), and were provided with the weather conditions and cleared for the approach.

The NDB approach to Runway 23 at Teniente Coronel Luis A. Mantilla Airport would take the airplane directly over the airport, bearing 085 degrees; the aircraft would then make a left-hand turn to heading 233 after 1.5 minutes, flying at 180 knots (210 mph; 330 km/h) IAS, all the while descending to a final altitude of 11,500 feet (3,500 m). The elevation of the runway is 9,679 feet (2,950 m); there are numerous mountain ridges and peaks located in the vicinity of the airport, which is located high in the Andes mountains. The Cumbal Volcano, which rises to an altitude of 15,626 feet (4,763 m), is located less than 20 miles (17 nmi; 32 km) due west of the airport.

TAME flight 120 entered the approach from the southwest, passing slightly west of the NDB, as opposed to directly over it. The pilot began the turn correctly, but was flying too fast; the aircraft was flying at 230 knots (260 mph; 430 km/h), rather than the required 180 knots. This took the 727 wide of its intended course; by the time it came around to a westerly heading, it was flying not towards the runway, but into the side of the Cumbal Volcano.

The aircraft crashed into the side of the mountain at 10:23 AM, after which no further contact was made with the flight. The impact occurred at an elevation of 14,700 feet (4,500 m), some 1,400 feet (430 m) below the volcano's summit. Visibility was very poor at the time of the accident; the wreckage was not found until almost a day later.

== Investigation ==
The investigation committee of the Special Administrative Unit of Civil Aeronautics (Colombia) found the probable cause of the accident to be the following:

1. The pilot's decision... to initiate and continue the flight towards Tulcán Airport while below minimum meteorological conditions established in the company's standard operating procedure.
2. Inadequate navigation and operation of the aircraft by the pilot in command... consistent with entering the holding pattern at the Tulcán NDB with a velocity of 230 knots indicated and with a bank angle of 15 degrees, exceeding the maximum limit of 180 knots stipulated throughout the procedure, and using a bank angle inferior to the recommended 25 to 30 degrees, thereby departing... holding pattern obstacle protection, leading to a collision against the Cumbal Volcano.

— Final report, Special Administrative Unit of Civil Aeronautics
