= Carchi River =

River of Ecuador

Coordinates: 0.8153°N 77.6649°W

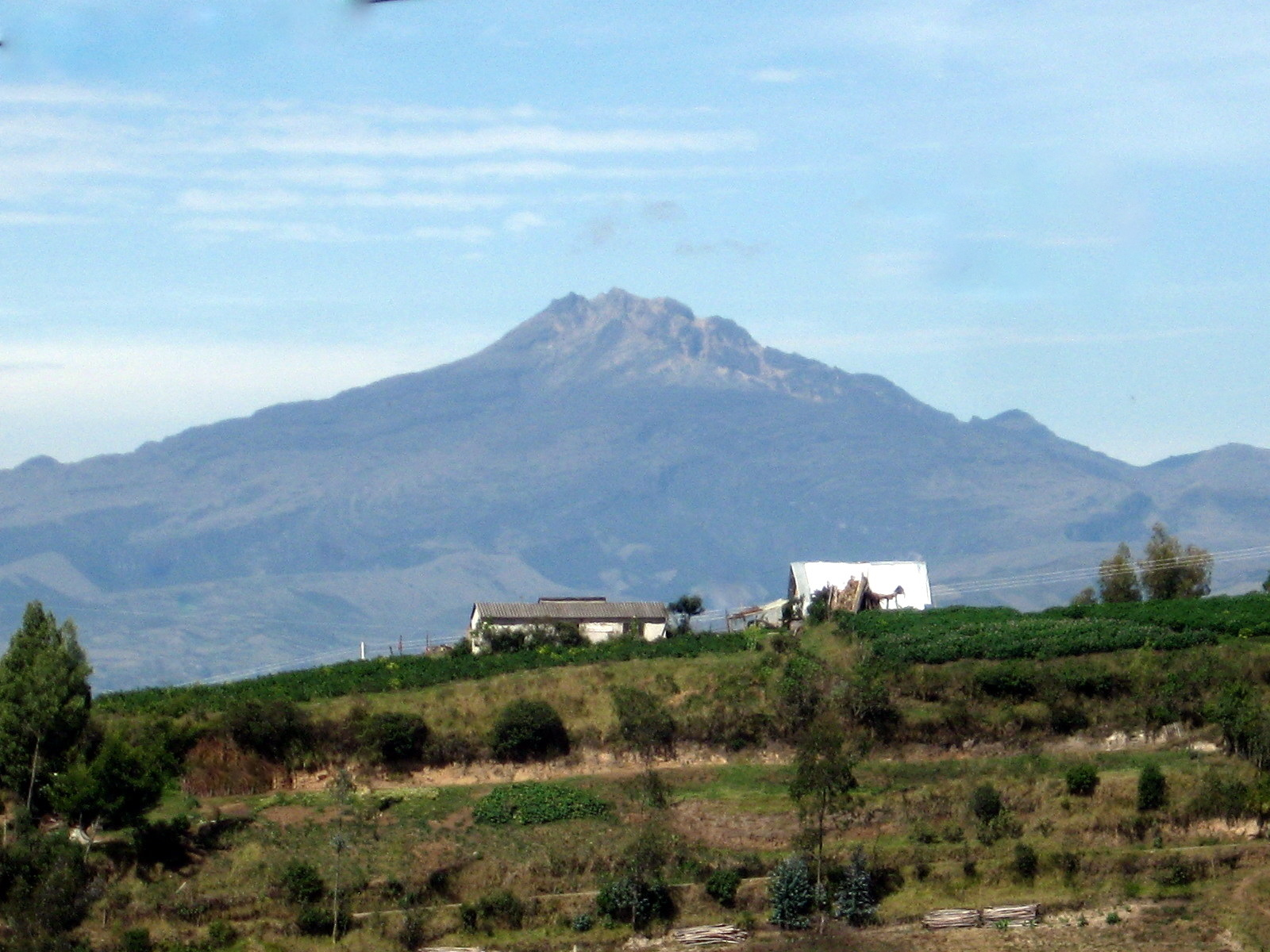
- The Carchi River rises on the slopes of Chiles Volcano.

Location
- Countries: Ecuador; Colombia

Physical characteristics
- Source
  - elevation: 4,698 m (15,413 ft)

The Carchi River is a river of Ecuador. It rises on the slopes of Chiles Volcano, elevation 4,698 metres (15,413 ft), on the border of Ecuador and Colombia. The river flows eastward across the high plateau of El Angel. The Carchi has a total course of about 45 kilometres (28 mi), forming the border between Colombia and Ecuador for about 20 kilometres (12 mi). It passes between the cities of Tulcan, Ecuador and Ipiales, Colombia and beneath the Rumichaca Bridge, the principal terrestrial link between Colombia and Ecuador. Entering Colombia, the Carchi becomes known as the Guáitara River which is a tributary of the Patía River.

The Pasto people lived along the Carchi River in pre-Columbian times. At the northernmost point of the Inca Empire the Pasto were never fully conquered by the Incas. The Carchi was known as the Angasmayo River by the Incas and the early Spanish colonists. A natural stone bridge at Rumichaca was the northernmost outpost of the Inca Empire.

== See also ==
- List of rivers of Ecuador
- Rand McNally, The New International Atlas, 1993.
- GEOnet Names Server
- Water Resources Assessment of Ecuador
