= Tulcán Canton =

- Canton
- Flag

- Location of Carchi Province in Ecuador.

- Tulcán Canton in Carchi Province
- Coordinates: 0°48′42″N 77°43′7″W
- Country: Ecuador
- Province: Carchi Province
- Capital: Tulcán

Area
  - Total: 1,812 km^{2} (700 sq mi)

Population (2022 census)
  - Total: 92,375
  - Density: 50.98/km^{2} (132.0/sq mi)
- Time zone: UTC-5 (ECT)

Tulcán Canton is a canton of Ecuador, located in Carchi Province. Its capital is the city of Tulcán. The population of the canton in the 2001 census was 77,175 and 86,498 in the 2010 census. The area of the canton is 1,812 square kilometres (700 sq mi).

Most of the population of the canton is in the Andes, especially in the city and surroundings of Tulcán, but the land area stretches into the Andes foothills to the west. Tulcan has the highest elevation of any city in Ecuador, 2,950 metres (9,680 ft) above sea level. The northern limit of the canton is the border with Colombia with the most important land passage between the two countries at Rumichaca Bridge.

The canton is sub-divided into ten parishes: El Carmelo (El Pun), El Chical, Julio Andrade (Orejuela), Maldonado, Pioter, Santa Martha de Cuba, Tobar Donoso (La Bocana de Camumbi), Tufiño, Tulcán, and Urbina (Taya).

Richard Carapaz, winner of the Giro d'Italia and the first Ecuadorian to win a Grand Tour of cycling was born in El Carmelo.

== Demographics ==
Ethnic groups as of the Ecuadorian census of 2010:

- Mestizo 87.4%
- Indigenous 5.3%
- Afro-Ecuadorian 3.6%
- White 3.3%
- Montubio 0.3%
- Other 0.2%
