= Guáitara River =

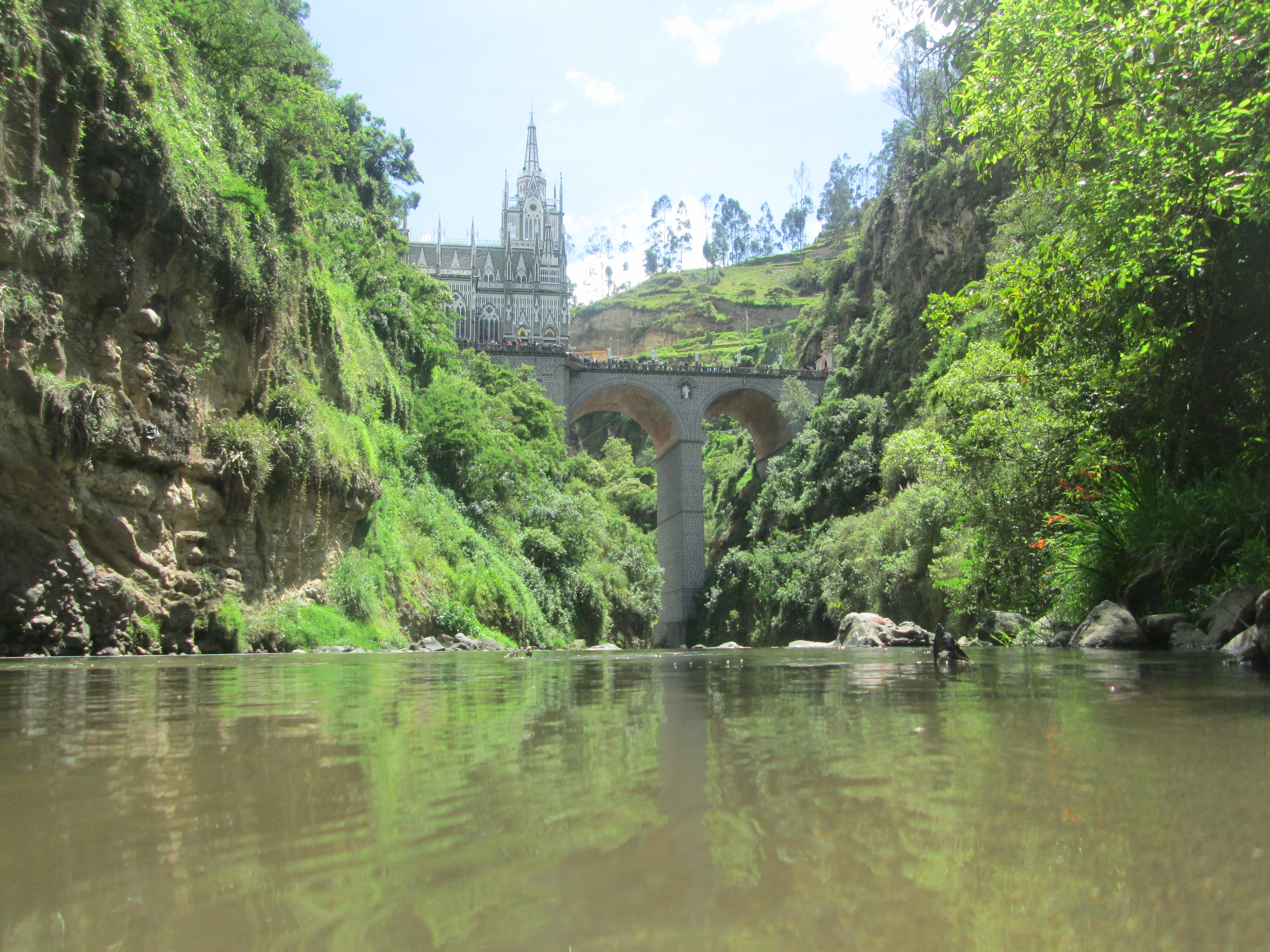
- Bridge over the Guáitara at Las Lajas Sanctuary, Ipiales

- Mouth location in Colombia
- Native name: Río Guáitara (Spanish)

Location
- Country: Colombia

Physical characteristics
- Source
  - elevation: 4,753 m (15,594 ft)
- Mouth
  - coordinates: 01°35′16″N 77°26′47″W
  - elevation: 400 m (1,300 ft)
- Length: 158 km (98 mi)
- Basin size: 3,713 km^{2} (1,434 sq mi)
- Discharge
  - average: 7.55 m^{3}/s (267 cu ft/s)

Basin features
- River system: Patía River

The Guáitara River (Spanish: Río Guáitara) is a river of Colombia. It is a tributary of the Patía River.

== Course ==
The Guáitara River rises on the border of Ecuador and Colombia on the slopes of Chiles Volcano and initially flows east, eventually turning north to join the Patia. It is called the Carchi River in Ecuador.

In its lower reaches the river is in the Patía Valley dry forests ecoregion.

== See also ==
- List of rivers of Colombia
