= Cerro Negro de Mayasquer =

Volcano on the border of Colombia and Ecuador

- Location within Ecuador

Highest point
- Elevation: 4,445 m (14,583 ft)
- Listing: Volcanoes of Colombia
- Coordinates: 0°49′39″N 77°57′52″W

Geography
- Location: Nariño Colombia; Carchi Ecuador
- Parent range: Central Ranges; Cordillera Real; Andes

Geology
- Rock age: Pleistocene
- Mountain type: Andesitic stratovolcano
- Volcanic belt: Northern Volcanic Zone, Andean Volcanic Belt
- Last eruption: July 1936(?)

Cerro Negro de Mayasquer is a volcano on the border of Colombia and Ecuador. It lies 3 kilometres (2 mi) north-west of the volcano Chiles, and the two peaks are considered part of the same Chiles-Cerro Negro volcanic complex. These volcanoes, together with Cumbal are andesitic in rock type. A 1936 eruption reported by the Colombian government agency INGEOMINAS may have been from the Ecuadorean volcano Reventador, otherwise the volcano has not erupted for around 160,000 years.

== See also ==
- List of volcanoes in Colombia
- List of volcanoes in Ecuador
- List of volcanoes by elevation
- List of mountains in Colombia
