= Sanctuary of Las Lajas =

Basilica church in Nariño, Colombia

Basilica of Our Lady of the Holy Rosary of Las Lajas
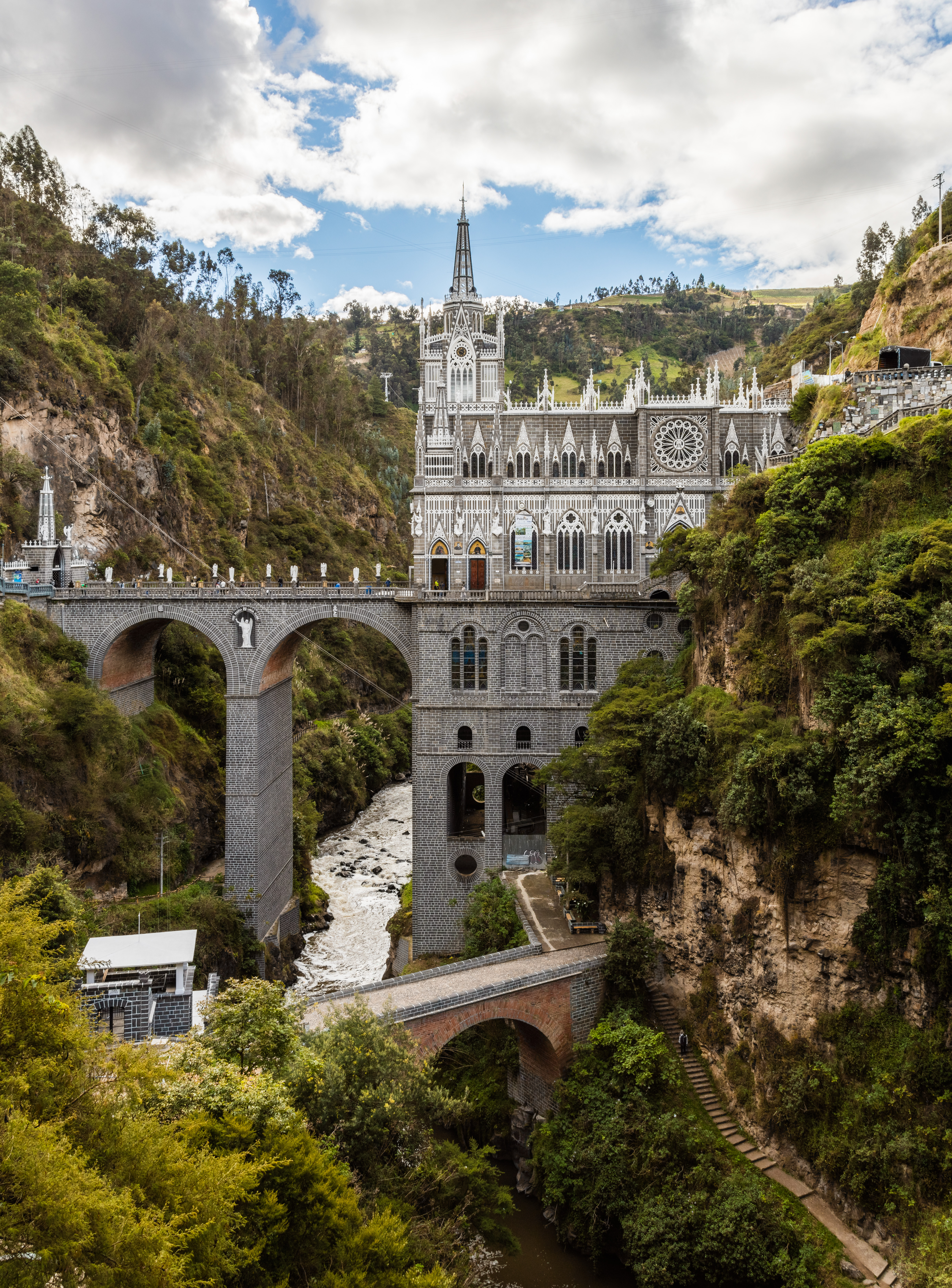

Religion
- Affiliation: Catholic Church

Location
- Location: Ipiales, Nariño, Colombia
- Interactive map of Basilica of Our Lady of the Holy Rosary of Las Lajas
- Coordinates: 0°48′20″N 77°35′10″W

Architecture
- Architect: Lucindo Maria Espinosa Medina

The Basilica of Our Lady of the Holy Rosary of Las Lajas is a Roman Catholic minor basilica located within the canyon of the Guáitara River in Ipiales, Colombia. The Marian shrine is dedicated to the Blessed Virgin Mary venerated under the title of Our Lady of the Rosary.

Pope Pius XII granted a Pontifical Decree of coronation to the image as Sancta Virgo de Rupe (English: Holy Virgin of the Rock) on 31 May 1951. The rite of coronation was executed by Cardinal Antonio Samore on 16 September 1952. The same Pontiff also raised the Marian shrine to the status of a Minor basilica via his decree Templum per Decorum on 30 August 1954. Pope Paul VI granted the Marian title as the “Virgin of the Holy Rosary” as the patroness of Ipiales via his decree Tutela Cælestis Virtutis on 26 April 1965.

The architect of the building was Lucindo María Espinosa Medina. It is a popular pilgrimage site for Christians from both Colombia and neighboring Ecuador, due to a Marian apparition that is purported to have taken place in the 18th century. The current church was built in a neo-gothic architectural style between 1916 and 1949. The name Laja is Spanish for a flagstone, and comes from the name of a type of flat sedimentary rock.

== History ==
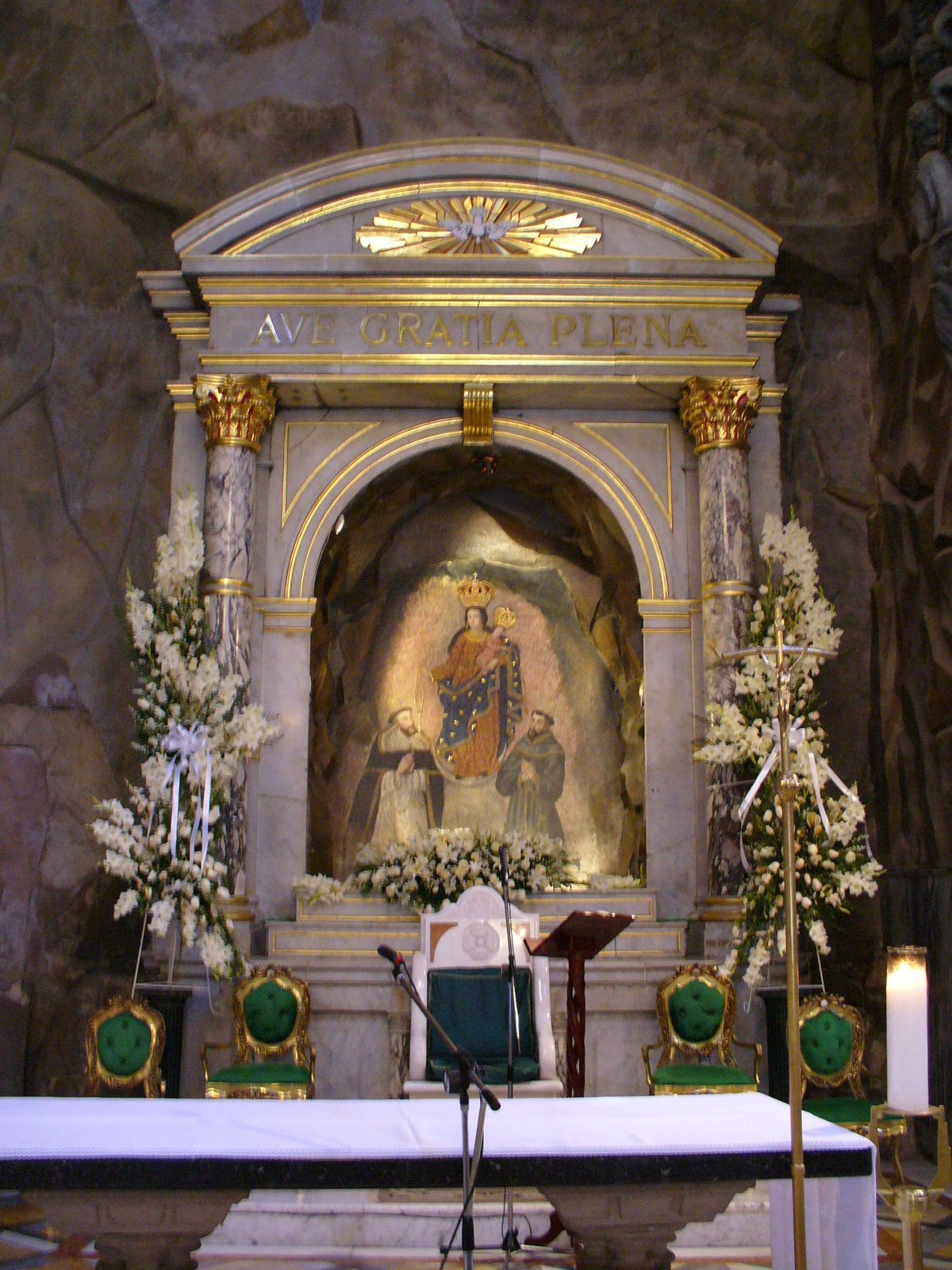
The image of the Blessed Virgin of the Holy Rosary enshrined within the Basilica

=== Overview ===
The inspiration for the church's creation was a purported miraculous event circa 1754, when Amerindian María Mueses de Quiñones and her deaf-mute daughter Rosa were caught in a very strong storm. The two sought refuge between the small lajas (slabs of stone), when, to Mueses' surprise, her daughter Rosa exclaimed "the Mestiza is calling me" and pointed to a lightning-illuminated silhouette over the laja. This apparition of the Virgin Mary instigated popular pilgrimage to the site and occasional reports of cases of miraculous healing. An image appeared in the stone that is several feet inside and is still visible today.

The existence of a shrine in this location was recorded in the accounts of friar Juan de Santa Gertrudis' journey through the southern region of the New Kingdom of Granada between 1756 and 1764. The first shrine was built here in the middle of 18th century from straw and wood. It was replaced with a 7 meter long brick chapel in 1795/96. From 1802 on, a new, larger shrine was built, which in turn was extended and connected to the opposite side of canyon with a bridge in the second half of the 19th century.

The current church was built between January 1, 1916, and August 20, 1949, with donations from local churchgoers. It rises 100 m (330 ft) high from the bottom of the canyon and is connected to the opposite side of the canyon by a 50 m (160 ft) tall bridge.

=== Dedication ===
The shrine is located in southern Colombia and has been a tourism and pilgrimage destination since the eighteenth century. The Spanish Franciscan Juan de Santa Gertrudis (1724–1799) mentions the sanctuary in Book III, Part 2, of his four-volume chronicle of his 1756–62 journey in the south portion of the Kingdom of New Granada (titled "Wonders of Nature"). This is possibly the oldest reference to its existence.

== Pious legends ==
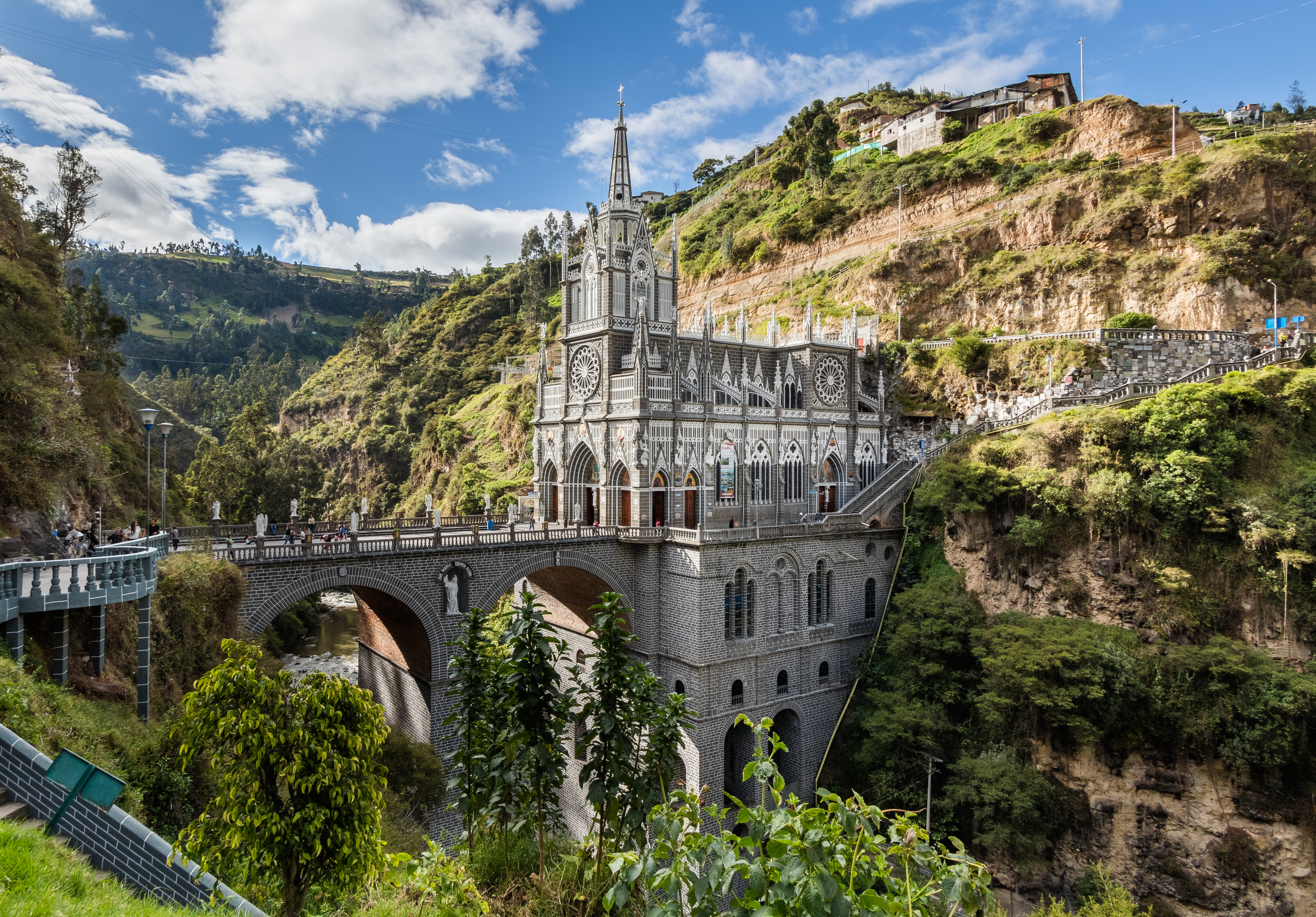
Las Lajas Sanctuary

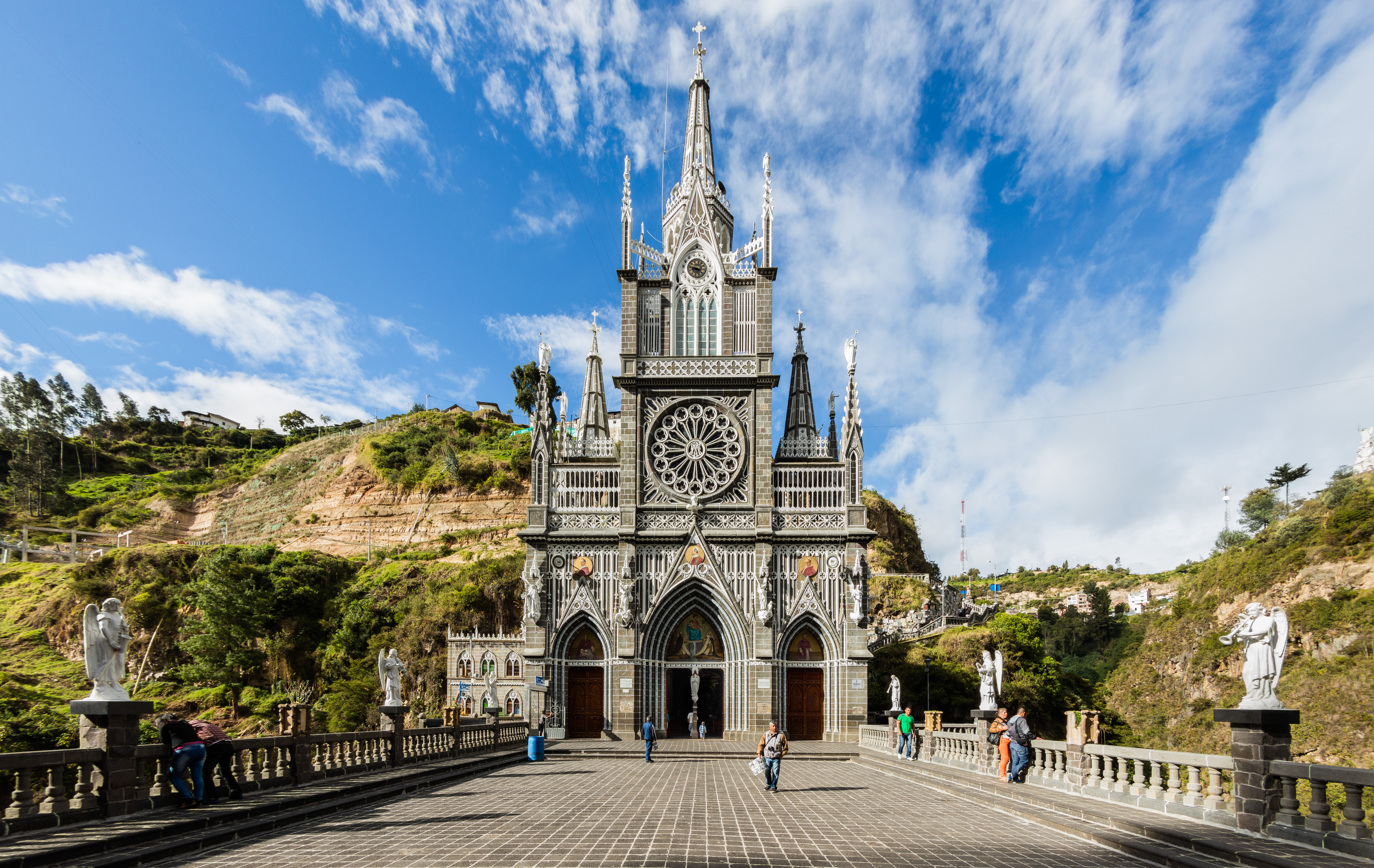
Frontal view

The shrine is renowned for its architecture, for a series of legends involving the appearance of the Holy Virgin Mary, and for a mysterious mural of unknown origin. Located in the southwestern Colombian state of Nariño, the Sanctuary sits on a 50 metre (130-foot) high bridge built over the Guaitara river, less than 11 km (seven miles) from the Ecuadoran border. The neo-Gothic church was erected by worshipers between 1916 and 1953, to replace a shrine first built in the middle of the 18th century.

According to popular belief, the Virgin Mary appeared to a woman and her deaf-mute daughter in 1754 at the same place where the church now stands. The woman, Maria Mueses de Quiñones, and her daughter Rosa were passing by the Guaitara river when they sought refuge from a storm. At that moment, Rosa shouted "Mum, the Virgin is calling me!" and pointed to an apparition of the Virgin Mary. The woman kept quiet about the apparition until something even less expected happened: after Rosa died, Mueses, determined to pray for her daughter's soul, returned to the place where her daughter and she had seen the Virgin Mary; the Virgin then miraculously revived Rosa, and mother and daughter could no longer keep the miracle a secret. The first shrine in the honor of Jesus Christ's mother was built a few years after the alleged appearance, according to the journal of a friar who travelled through the region between 1756 and 1764. Half a century later, in 1802, a bigger shrine was built and worshipers erected the first version of the bridge that now allows access to the church.

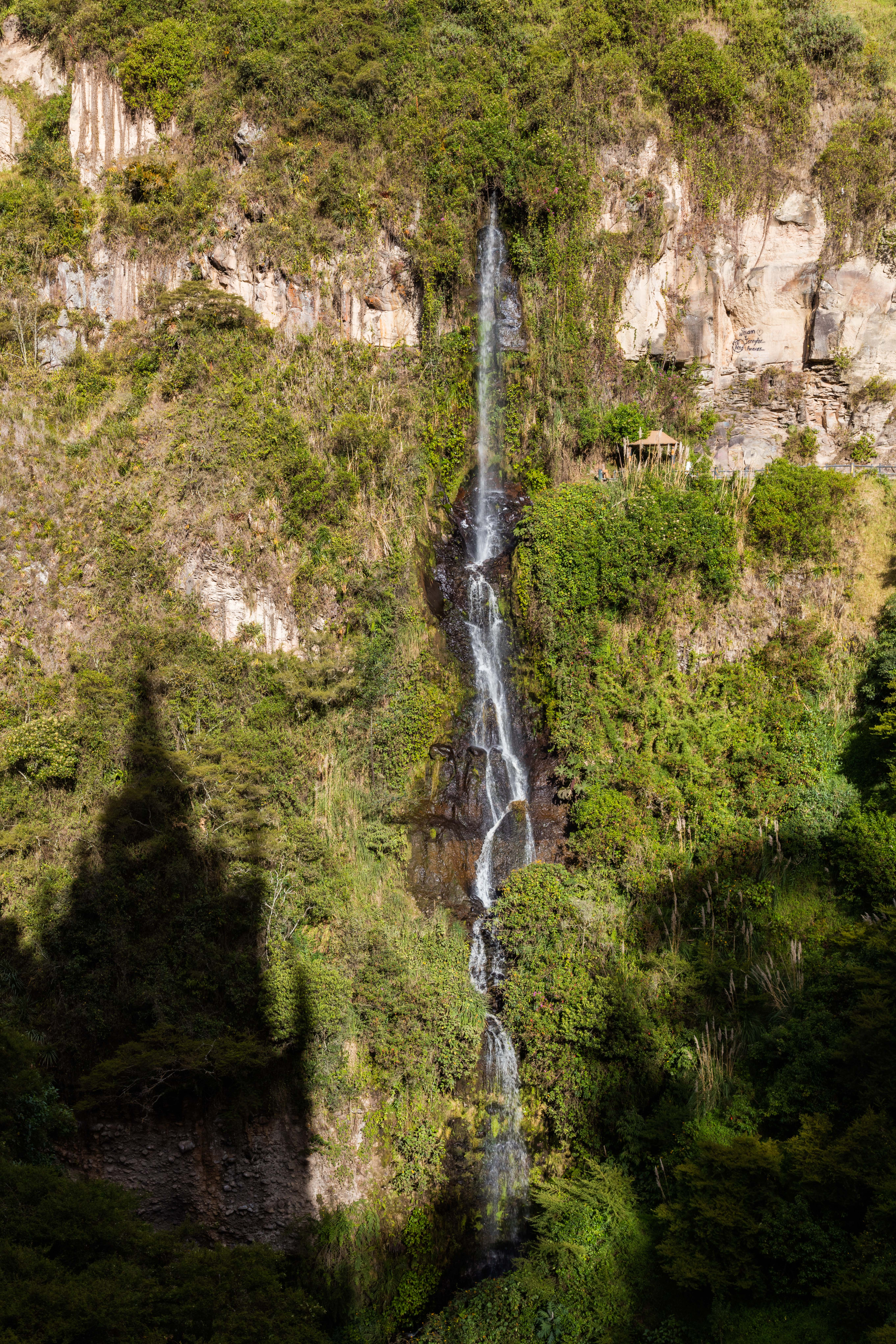
The cascada, a small waterfall that descends in stages.

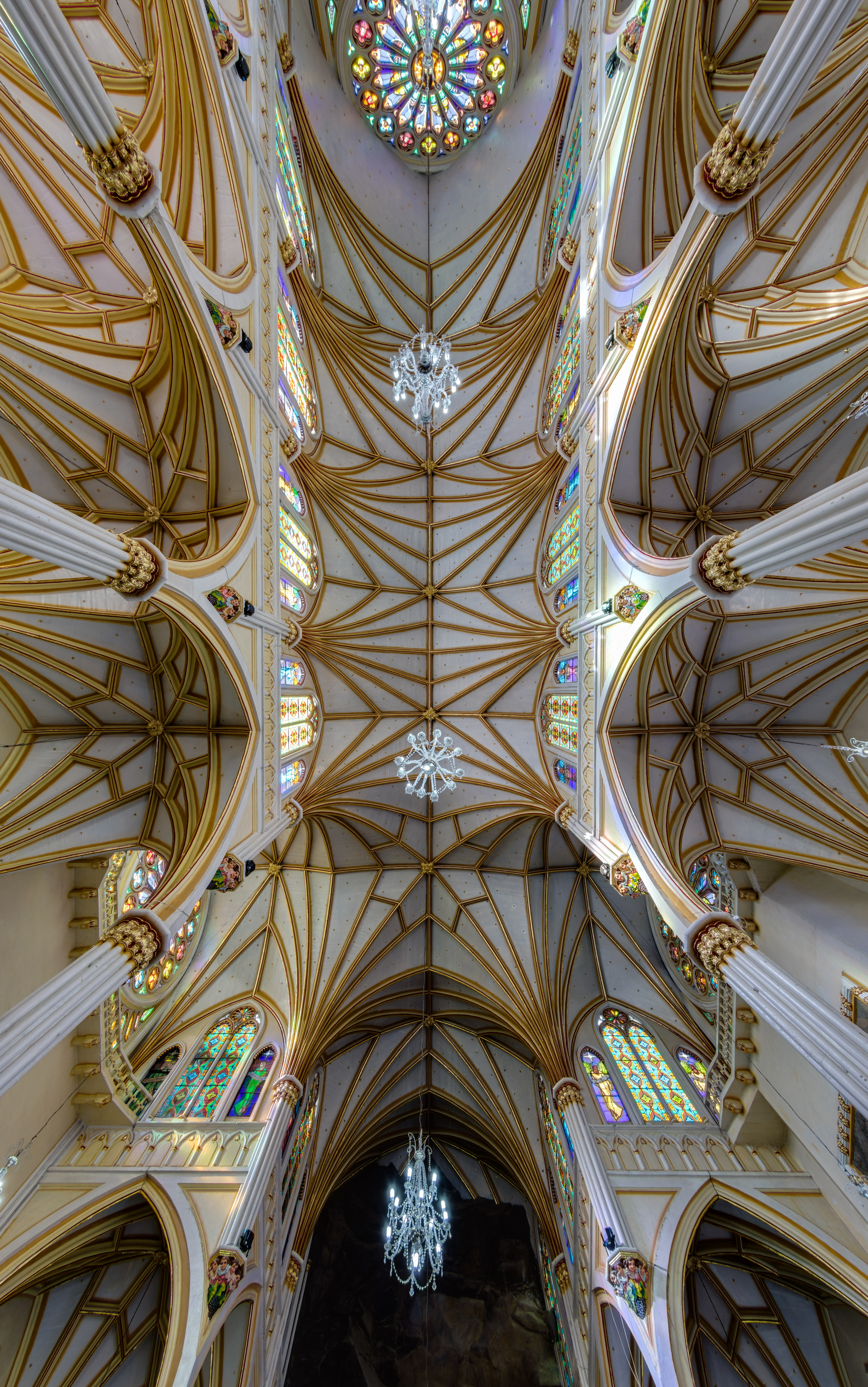
Ornate ceiling of a nave, or the central part of the church building.

The apparition of the Virgin Mary is only the first of a number of legends and mysteries linked to Las Lajas Sanctuary. For example, nobody knows who made the image of the Virgin that is at the back of the church, behind the altar. According to some, the image was first seen when Mueses wanted to show a priest and other local people where her daughter had been revived. On arrival, the worshipers saw the image of the Virgin Mary and Jesus imprinted in a stone wall. The image supposedly extends several feet into the stone, but this has not been verified. It attracts thousands of pilgrims every year.

Pope Pius XII granted the venerated Marian image of the shrine a canonical coronation on 16 September 1952 via decree from 31 May 1951. The shrine was then elevated to a minor basilica on 1954. The image is also declared Principal Patroness of the Diocese of Ipiales on 1965.

By some measures, it is the second most popular pilgrimage site in Colombia, after Our Lady of the Rosary of Chiquinquirá. Its location close to the Ecuador border makes it a popular destination for pilgrims from both countries.
