= Lucindo Espinosa =

Colombian builder and architect (1871–1945)

Lucindo Maria Espinosa Medina
- Born: 1871; Pasto, Nariño, Colombia
- Died: 1945 (aged 73–74)
- Citizenship: Colombia
- Occupation: Architect
- Notable work: Sanctuary of Las Lajas

Lucindo María Espinosa Medina (1871–1945) was a self-taught Colombian builder, architect and cabinetmaker from Pasto, Nariño. He is seen as one of the most important exponents in Republican architecture and Modern architecture in Nariño. He was one of the main architects of the Sanctuary of Las Lajas, one of Colombia's most symbolic architectural works.
