= Rumichaca Bridge =

Rumichaca Bridge Spanish: Puente internacional de Rumichaca
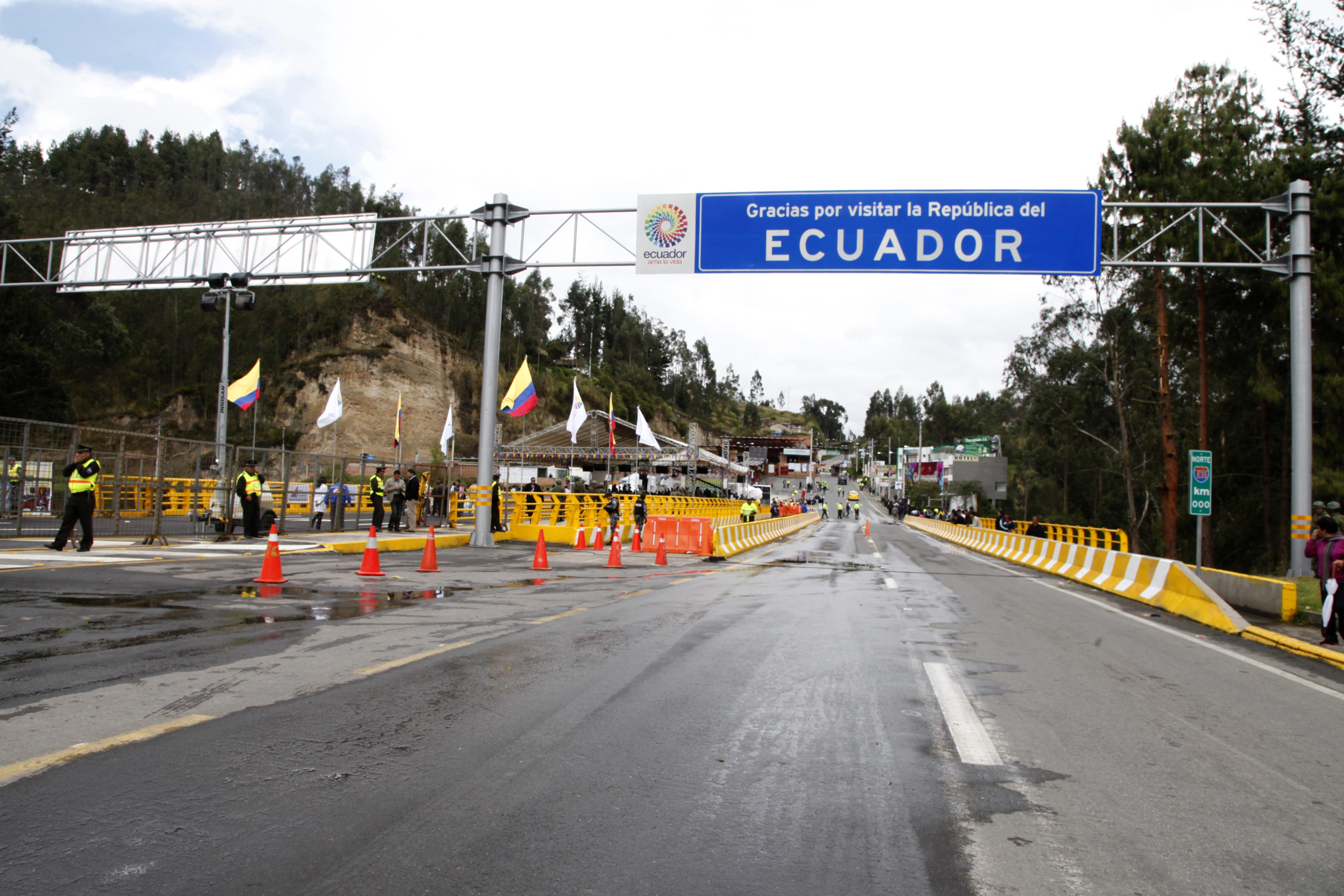
- Entering Ecuador on the modern Rumichaca Bridge.
- Coordinates: 0°48′50″N 77°39′51″W

Location
- Interactive map of Rumichaca Bridge

The Rumichaca Bridge (Quechua rumi stone, chaka bridge, "stone bridge") is the principal highway passage between Colombia and Ecuador. The bridge is located 3 kilometres (1.9 mi) from the city of Ipiales, Colombia and 7 kilometres (4.3 mi) from the city of Tulcán, Ecuador. The bridge is located in the Andes at an elevation of 2,763 metres (9,065 ft). The Pan-American Highway crosses the bridge.

== The stone bridge ==
Rumichaca received its name because here a natural stone bridge crosses the Carchi River (called the Guáitara River in Colombia). The stone bridge is often called the "Inca Bridge." The Carchi River was called the Angasmayo by the Incas and early Spanish colonists. The bridge, according to Spanish chroniclers, was the northernmost outpost of the Inca Empire, wrested from the Pasto people in the early 16th century. Atop this natural bridge are the old Colombian and Ecuadorian customs houses. Prior to the completion of the modern bridge in 1973, the stone bridge was used as a border crossing for goods and people.

== The modern bridge ==
The modern bridge, with a span of 200 metres (660 ft), is 80 metres (260 ft) upstream from the stone bridge, The bridge is the most important artery for commerce and the transport of goods between Colombia and Ecuador. In 2013, 57.9 percent (about US$ one billion) of Colombia's exports to Ecuador crossed the border on the Rumichaca Bridge. In the same year, 77 percent (about US$ 650 million) of Ecuador's exports to Colombia crossed the Rumichaca bridge.

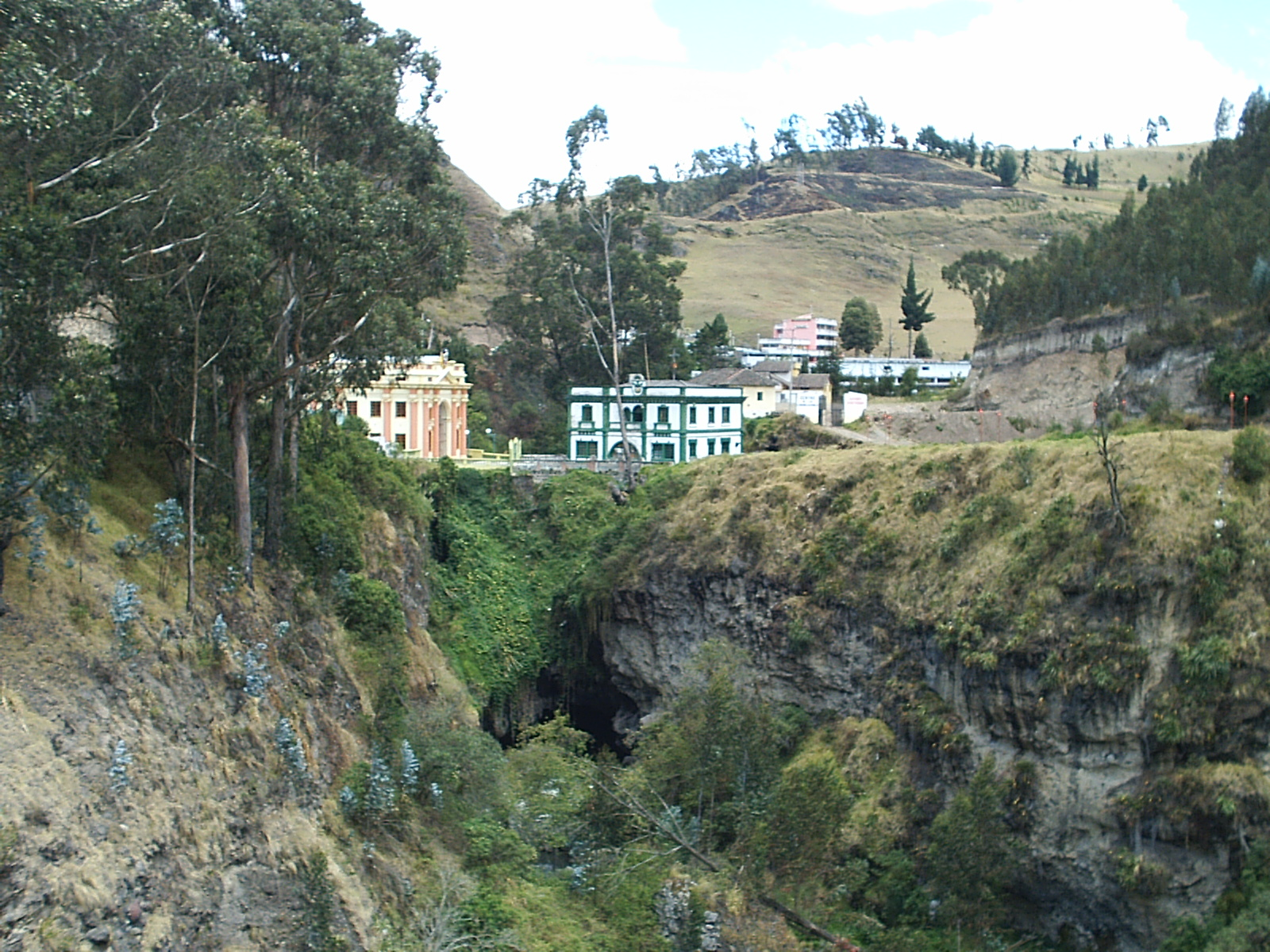
The old customs houses of Colombia and Ecuador sit atop the stone bridge.

== Venezuelan refugees and migrants ==
From May 2017 until July 2019 nearly 1.7 million Venezuelans entered Ecuador, most of them across the Rumichaca Bridge. The Venezuelan refugees and migrants were fleeing hunger and hyperinflation occurring in their country. Four hundred thousand remained in Ecuador and the others continued on to Peru, Chile, and Argentina.

== See also ==
- List of international bridges
