= Teniente Coronel Luis A. Mantilla International Airport =

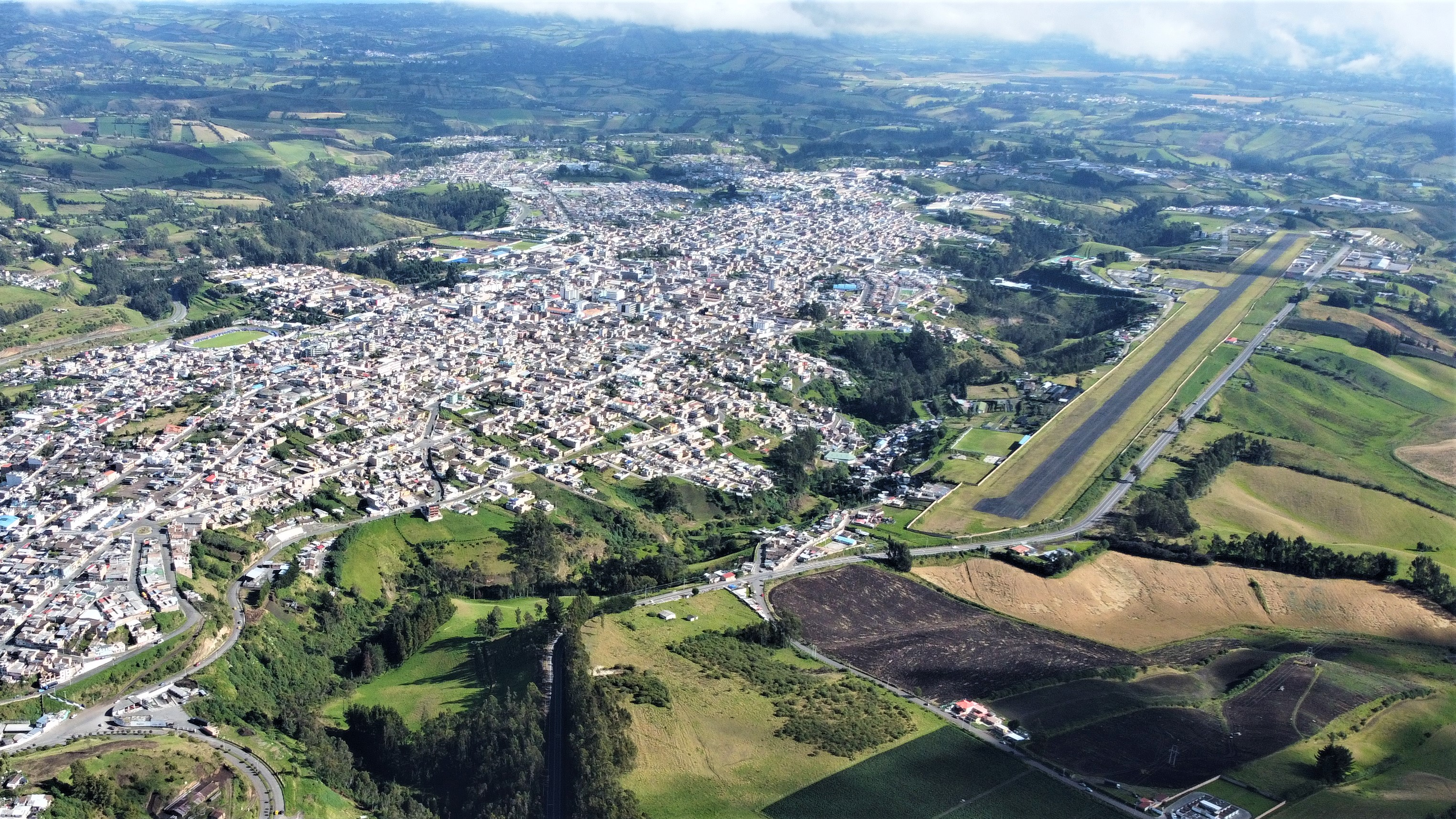
- IATA: TUA; ICAO: SETU

Summary
- Airport type: Public
- Location: Tulcán, Ecuador
- Elevation AMSL: 9,649 ft / 2,941 m
- Coordinates: 00°48′35″N 77°42′30″W

Map
- Location of airport in Ecuador

Runways
Direction	Length		Surface
Direction	m	ft	Surface
05/23	2,460	8,071	Asphalt
- Sources: GCM

Teniente Coronel Luis A. Mantilla International Airport (IATA: TUA, ICAO: SETU) is a high elevation airport serving Tulcán, capital of the Carchi Province of Ecuador.

== Accidents and incidents ==
TAME Flight 120, a Boeing 727-100, en route from Quito, Ecuador, crashed into the side of Cumbal Volcano, near the airport on 28 January 2002. There were no survivors among the 87 passengers and seven crew on board.

== See also ==
- Transport in Ecuador
- List of airports in Ecuador
