= Tulcán =

- City
- Flag
- Nickname: "Heir of the Sun, and Earth"
- Location within Ecuador
- Coordinates: 0°48′42″N 77°43′7″W
- Country: Ecuador
- Province: Carchi
- Canton: Tulcán Canton

Government
  - Mayor: Andrés Ruano

Area
  - City: 11.09 km^{2} (4.28 sq mi)
- Elevation: 2,980 m (9,780 ft)

Population (2022 census)
  - City: 56,719
  - Density: 5,114/km^{2} (13,250/sq mi)
- Demonym(s): Tulcaneño,-a
- Time zone: UTC−5
- Postal code: EC040101-2
- Area code: (+593) 6
- Climate: Csb
- Website: www.gmtulcan.gob.ec (in Spanish)

"Tulcan" is also an alternative spelling of tulchan

Tulcán (Spanish pronunciation: [tulˈkan]) is the capital of the province of Carchi in Ecuador and the seat of Tulcán Canton. The population of the city of Tulcán was 56,719 in the 2022 census. Tulcán is known for its hot springs, deep wells, and 3-acre topiary garden cemetery, the most elaborate topiary in the New World, created with Cupressus sempervirens by José Maria Azael Franco in 1936. The city is the highest in Ecuador, at 2,950 m (9,680 ft) above sea level, and is located in the north of the Andes Mountains, 7 kilometres (4.3 mi) from the border with Colombia.

== Etymology ==
The name is a Spanish derivation of the indigenous peoples' original name Hul-Can, which means "Warrior".

== History ==
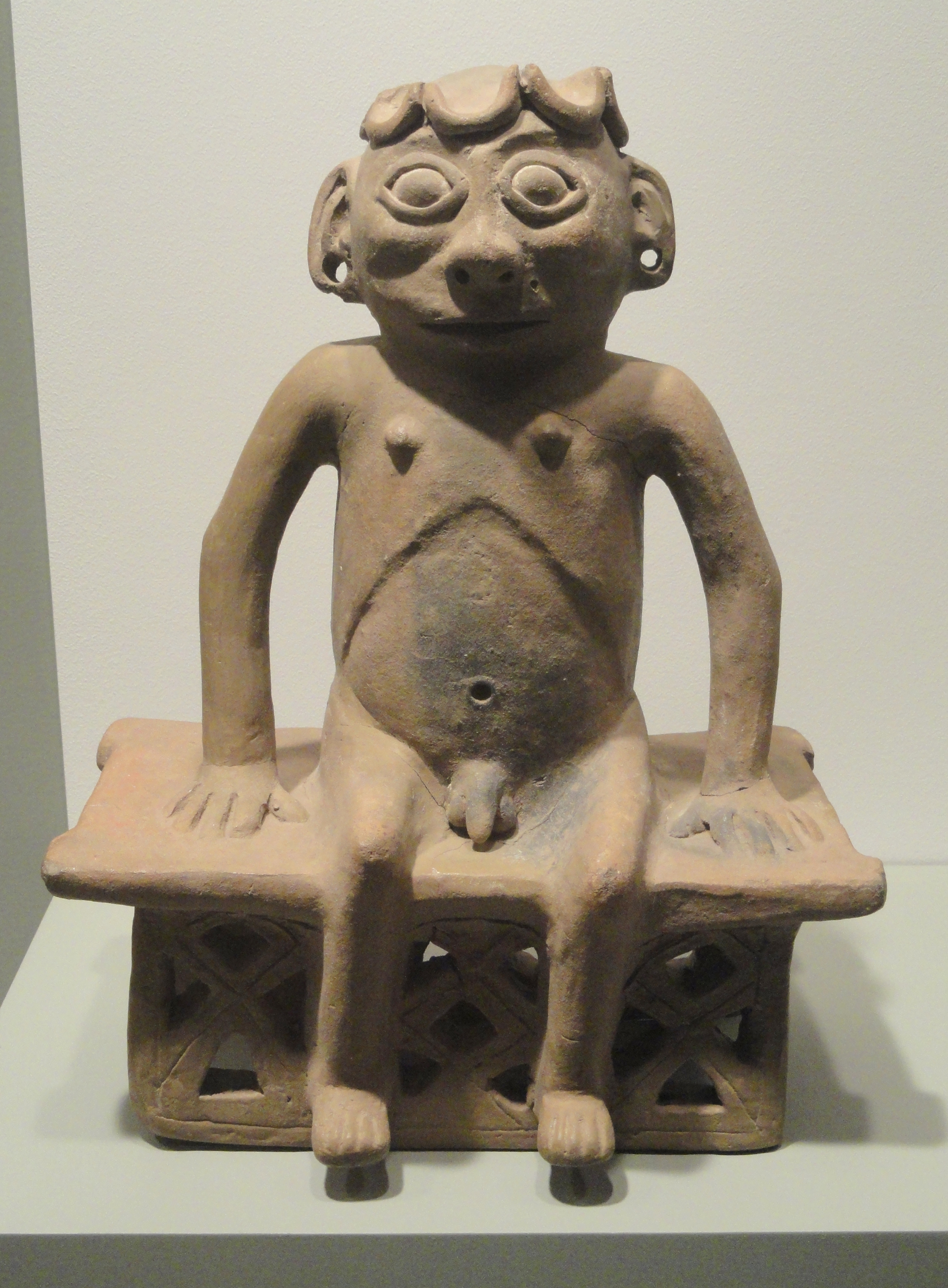
Male figure Carchi style CA 1100–1400

The first known history of the aboriginal occupants of this land begins with the failed Incan conquests. Tulcán sits within the northernmost outpost of the Inca Empire, which according to Spanish chroniclers, was the Rumichaca Bridge, located 7 kilometres (4.3 mi) from Tulcán and which is the present-day border with Colombia.

The Spanish, seeking gold, became interested in the Quillasingas (the name given to the indigenous people of the region), meaning "Gold Noses". Quillasingas were named without distinction of the ethnic occupants including the Pastos. Upon assuming the sovereignty for the Spanish crown, the territory was divided into provinces: Quillasinga road to Quito, Quillasinga road to Popayan, Quillasinga road to Almaguer, and Quillasinga road of the mountains. Tulcan's Spanish foundation is said to have been on June 11, 1535. With the arrival of colonists and further Spanish conquerors, its growth increased and immediately passed to be part of the Township of Otavalo, until 1600 when it passed to the Township of Ibarra. During the colonial age it remained under the authority of the Real Audiencia de Quito, in which it increased its economic importance, until it became the most significant locality in the region.

=== Independence ===
Independence movements and proclamations sparked through the region. The independence movement in Carchi was led by Alejandro Ruano, Antonio Baca, Cecilio Arciniegas, Esteban Baca, Leandro Campiño, José María Pava, Antonio Rueda, and Ramón Montenegro. On April 14, 1814, with charges of conspiracy of fighting for independence, these men were shot in Bolivar. The population continued its rebellion and in 1820, it ratified the Declaration of Independence of 9 de Octubre. Upon Ecuador becoming a republic, Tulcán retained its importance because it became a border town.

== Proximity to Colombia ==
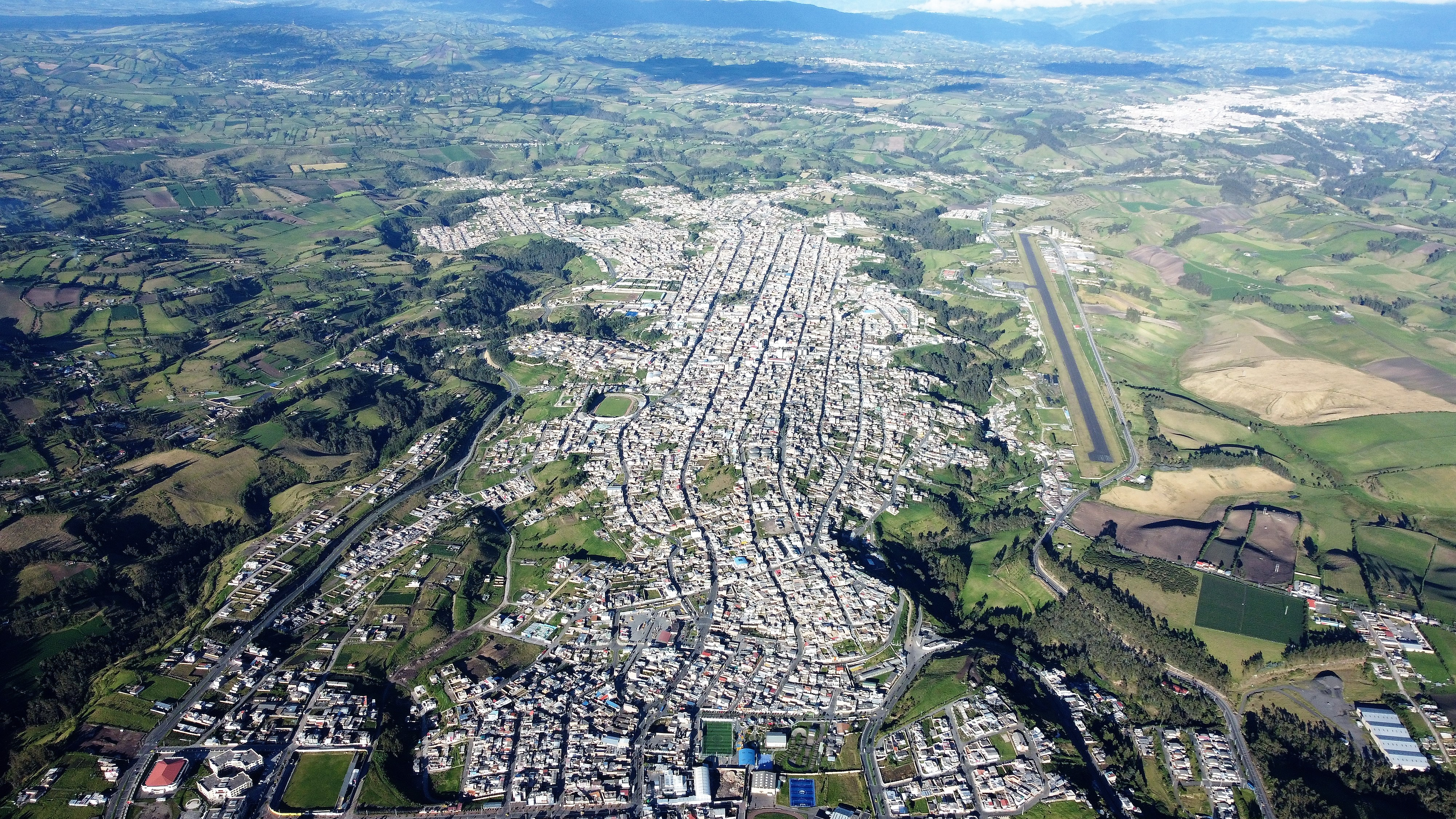
Aerial view of Tulcán. The Colombian city of Ipiales is in the upper right side

Tulcán is just 2 km (1.2 mi) from the Colombian border; the international bridge at Rumichaca which bridges the Carchi River is shared by the two countries. Tulcán is bounded on the north by the municipality of Ipiales (Colombia), on the south by the San Pedro de Huaca Canton, to the east by the Amazonian provinces of Sucumbios and to the west by the coastal province of Esmeraldas.

This city is known for its civic culture and modern business, similar to that of Colombia because of its proximity to and significant trade with that country.

Because of the proximity with Colombia, Tulcán and Ipiales form a bi-national conurbation with an approximate of 150.000 inhabitants.

== Geography ==
=== Climate ===
Tulcán features a subtropical highland climate (Csb) under the Köppen climate classification.

Climate data for Tulcán (El Rosal), elevation 2,940 m (9,650 ft), (1971–2000)
Month	Jan	Feb	Mar	Apr	May	Jun	Jul	Aug	Sep	Oct	Nov	Dec	Year
Mean daily maximum °C (°F)	17.0 (62.6)	17.2 (63.0)	17.0 (62.6)	17.2 (63.0)	17.2 (63.0)	16.4 (61.5)	15.9 (60.6)	16.1 (61.0)	16.9 (62.4)	17.7 (63.9)	17.8 (64.0)	17.5 (63.5)	17.0 (62.6)
Mean daily minimum °C (°F)	6.4 (43.5)	6.6 (43.9)	6.9 (44.4)	7.1 (44.8)	7.0 (44.6)	6.1 (43.0)	5.6 (42.1)	5.2 (41.4)	5.3 (41.5)	6.5 (43.7)	6.8 (44.2)	9.2 (48.6)	6.6 (43.8)
Average precipitation mm (inches)	71.0 (2.80)	72.0 (2.83)	87.0 (3.43)	95.0 (3.74)	69.0 (2.72)	56.0 (2.20)	35.0 (1.38)	34.0 (1.34)	46.0 (1.81)	114.0 (4.49)	123.0 (4.84)	89.0 (3.50)	891 (35.08)
Average relative humidity (%)	84	85	85	85	85	85	85	83	82	84	84	86	84
Source: FAO

== Transportation ==
Tulcán is very well connected in terms of land and air transport: the Panamerican Highway and Luis A. Mantilla airport are located nearby.

== See also ==
- Ecuador-Colombia relations
