= Ipiales =

City in Colombia

- Municipality and town
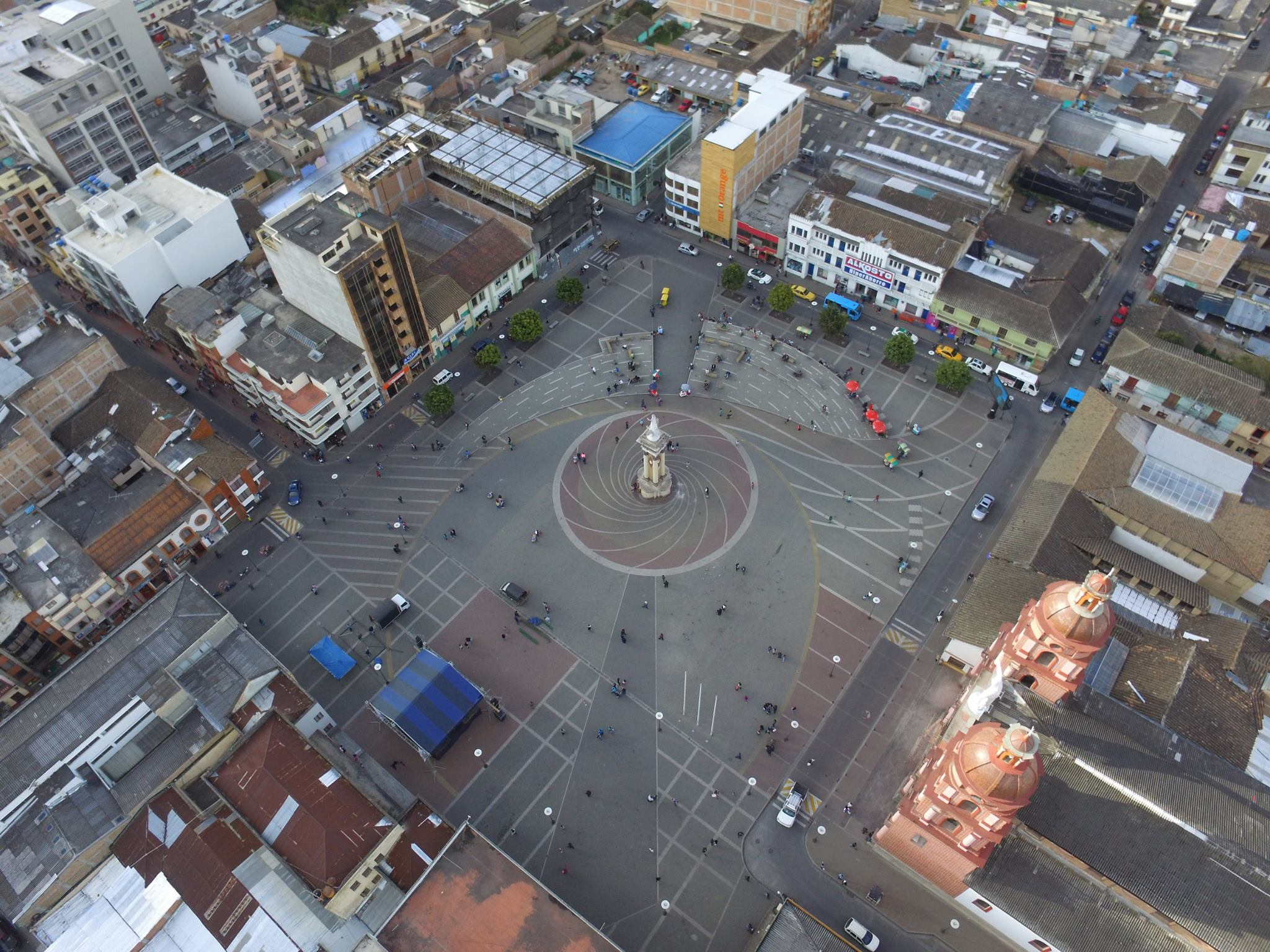
- Aerial view of Ipiales and Plaza 20 de Julio

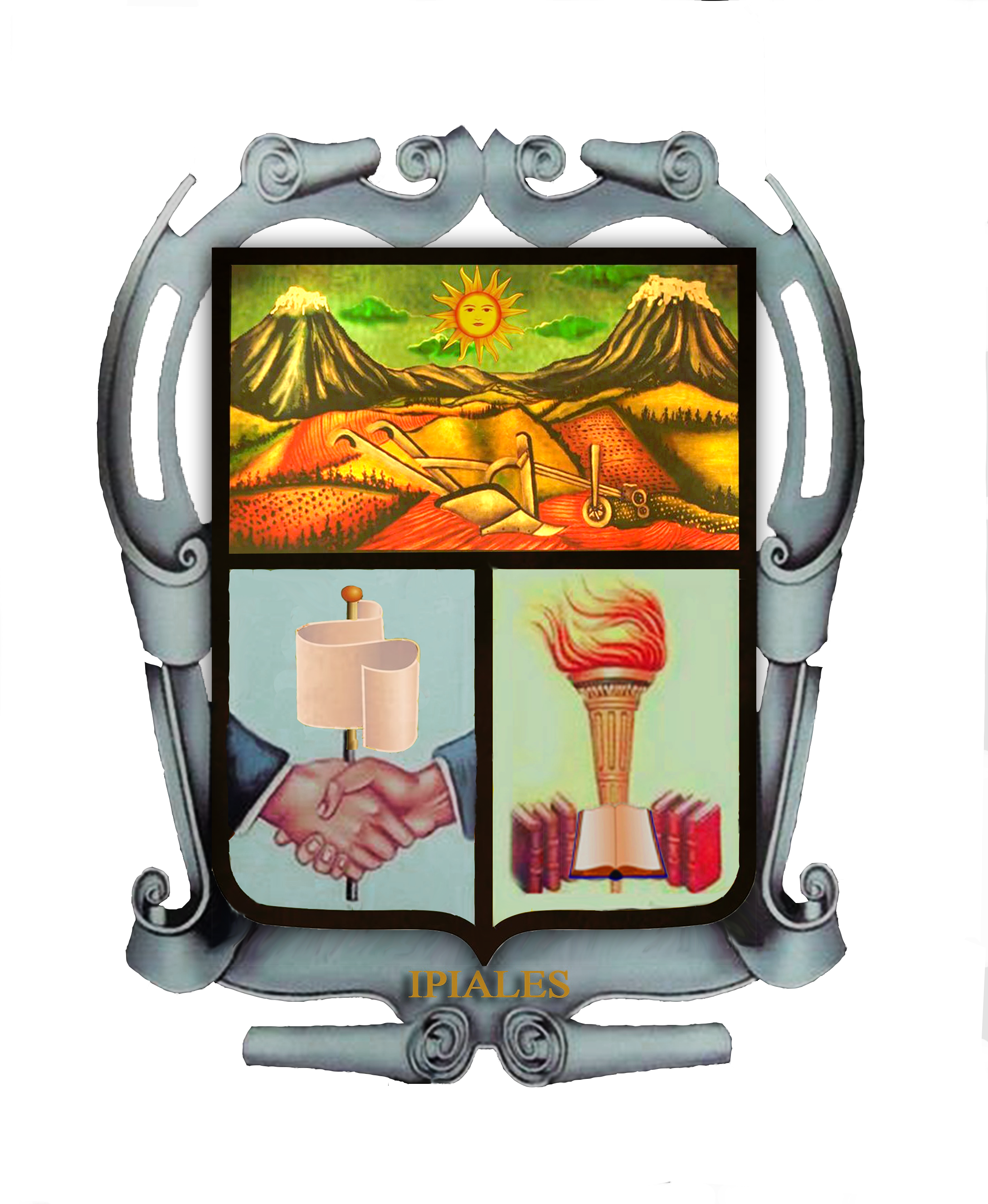
- Flag Coat of arms

- Location of the municipality and town of Ipiales in the Nariño Department of Colombia.

- Location in Colombia
- Coordinates: 0°49′49″N 77°38′40″W
- Country: Colombia
- Department: Nariño Department

Government
  - Mayor: Luis Fernando Villota

Area
  - Municipality and town: 1,572 km^{2} (607 sq mi)
  - Urban: 14.27 km^{2} (5.51 sq mi)
- Elevation: 2,898 m (9,508 ft)

Population (2018 census)
  - Municipality and town: 116,136
  - Density: 73.88/km^{2} (191.3/sq mi)
  - Urban: 77,343
  - Urban density: 5,420/km^{2} (14,040/sq mi)
- Demonym: Ipialeño
- Time zone: UTC-5 (Colombia Standard Time)
- Website: Official website (in Spanish)

Ipiales is a city and Catholic bishopric in Nariño Department, southern Colombia, near the border with Ecuador. It is located at around 0°49′49″N 77°38′40″W, with an elevation of about 2950 m. Ipiales is located on the high plateau called "Tuquerres e Ipiales," and lies at a distance of 82 km from Pasto, the department's capital. Ipiales is known as "la ciudad de las nubes verdes" (the city of the green clouds) because sometimes, especially in the afternoon, greenish clouds appear over the city. One of the area's favorite foods is the guinea pig or cavy (Cavia porcellus), called kuy or kuwi. The economy of this city is based on border trade between Ecuador and Colombia.

== Culture and religion ==
The municipality's main attraction is the impressive architecture of the Las Lajas Cathedral, the episcopal see of the Roman Catholic Diocese of Ipiales.

One of the biggest festivals is called the "Blacks and Whites Carnival". Through this event people from Ipiales celebrate racial diversity. People paint each other with make-up and a white soap, called careoca. Many tourists travel to see this event from all over the country.

== History ==
The Rumichaca Bridge, according to Spanish chroniclers, was the northernmost outpost of the Inca Empire, wrested from the Pasto people in the early 16th century. The bridge, crossing the Carchi River, is 3 kilometres (1.9 mi) from Ipiales on the border with Ecuador.

== Economy and transport ==
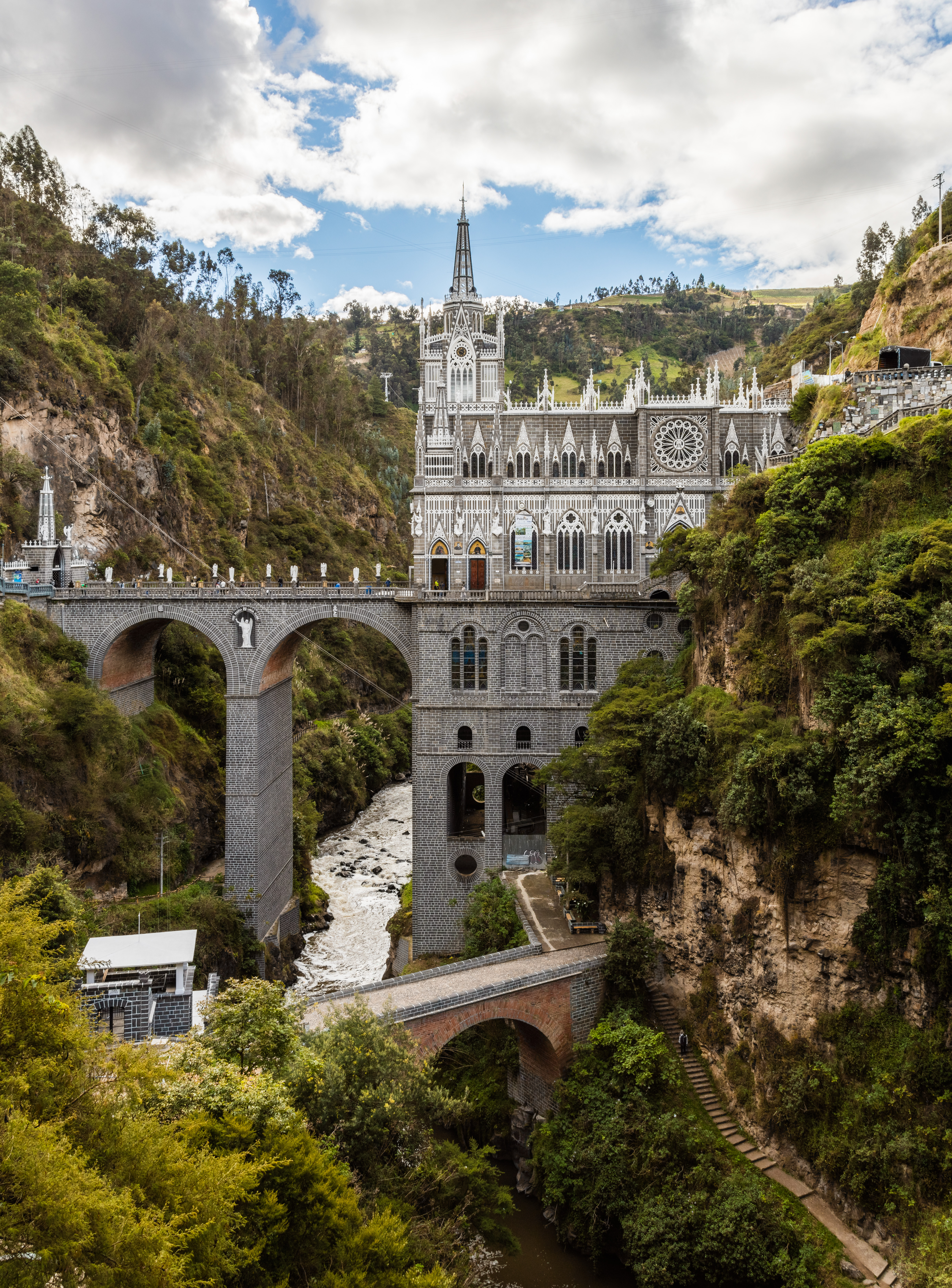
Santuario de las Lajas

The inhabitants of the town of Ipiales are as important economic activities: trade, small businesses, tourism, and in rural areas: agriculture, livestock, minor species. In minerals: oil on Churuyaco jungle, rock quarries and crafts in Las Lajas, topdressing in Old Bridge, clay in the Tejar. Natural resources are abundant throughout its territory.

Ipiales is a land and air border port, with intense trade with the peoples of the former province of Obando and as crossroad for travelers from the Andean Pact countries, especially Ecuador, it is the second most important border in Colombia. There is wide legislation to control the flow of people and vehicles, with international treaties and agreements on economic and border relations in all social cultural and economic, the Neighborhood and Integration Commission Colombo - Ecuador 1989. Republic of Colombia. Neighbourhood Binational Commissions. The Border Integration 1993, the Border Act 1995. The Special Economic Zone Export 2000, to improve the economic, institutional and social of this region, but everything has been "good intentions", as there is no vocation to create business, manufacturing or assembling artifacts, goods or services, for we do not have the infrastructure, equipment or decision for these projects.

The city is served by San Luis Airport.

== Geography ==
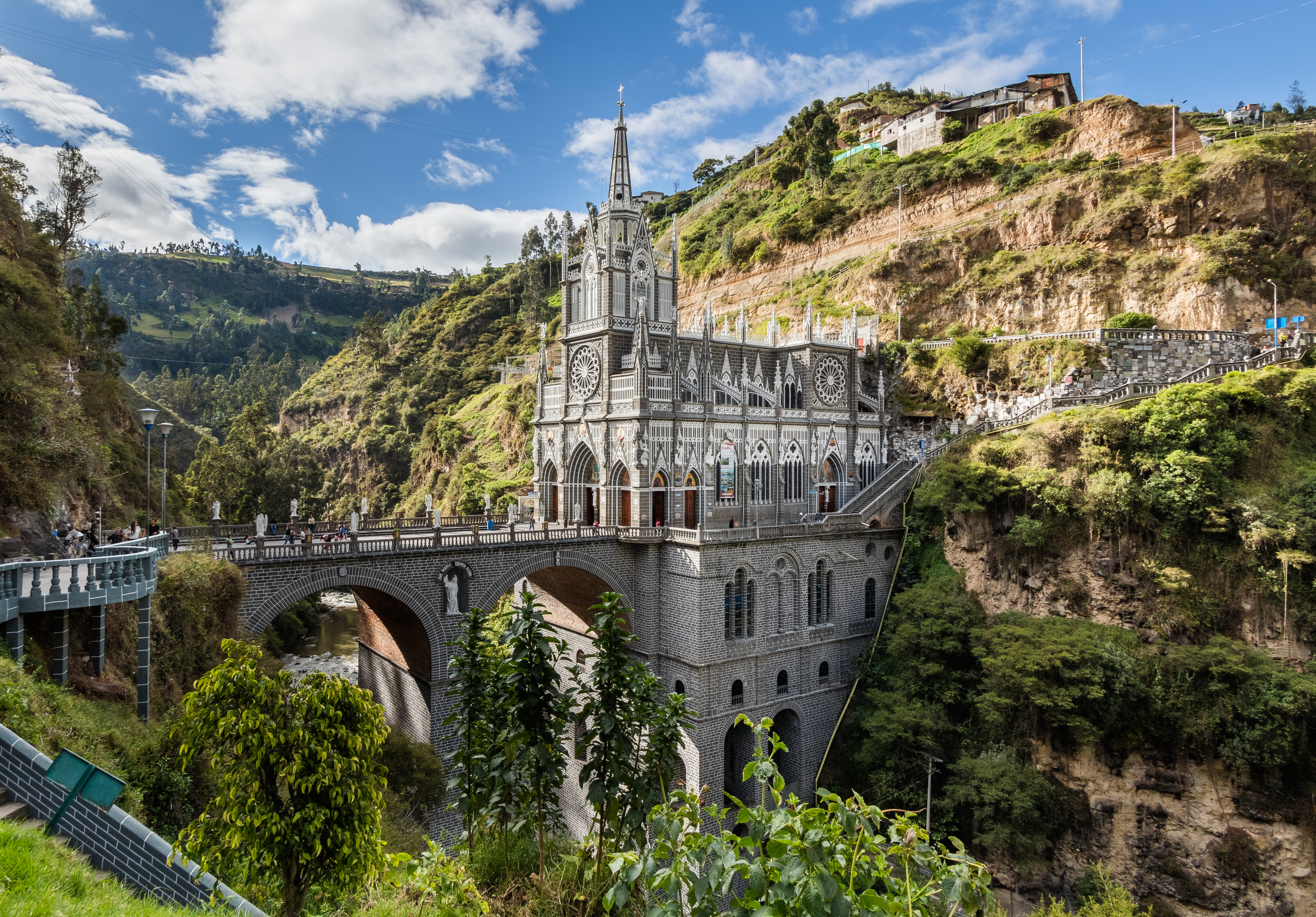
Las Lajas Cathedral

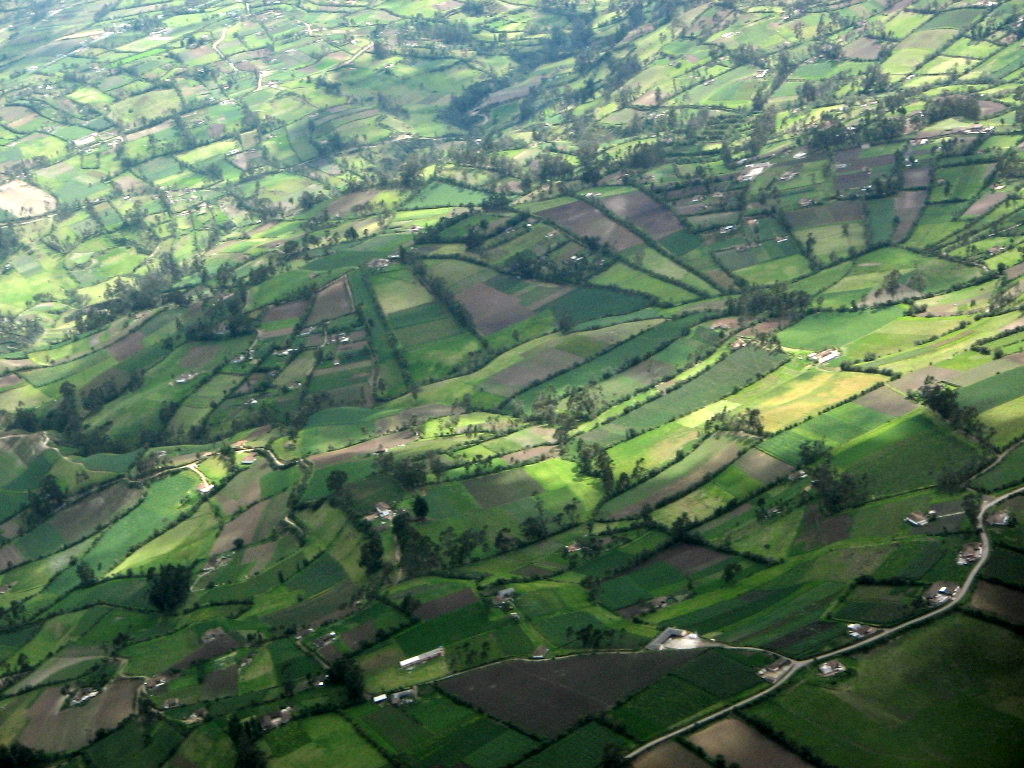
Landscape ipialeño.

The municipality of Ipiales is the southwest of Colombia, and the Department of Nariño, in the Andean highlands of 'Túquerres and Ipiales'. The city is located 3 km from the Colombian-Ecuadorian and 82 km of Pasto. It communicates with the interior by the Pan American Highway, which continues along the Ecuadorian population Tulcán, after crossing the international bridge Rumichaca (Quechua rumi stone, chaka bridge, "stone bridge") over the river Carchi in Narino territory called Guaytara to 800 meters, from the viewpoint of Ipiales.

=== Orographic ===
The orographic Ipiales Township are part of Narino highlands, the Guaitara canyon, and the Western Cordillera; Cofanía valley and part of the Amazon basin. The moors: to Mueses and The Palace, the hills: Troy, La Quinta, Culachí, Black, French, Tigre and Pax. The territory of the municipality is slightly wavy with climatic zones: cold, desert, warm, medium, respectively. Geographic Institute "Agustin Codazzi '. T. Andrade, Ob. cit., 1974. The average height of the town is 2900 m, making it Colombia's highest city (although not the highest town) and among the highest cities in the world.

=== Hydrography ===
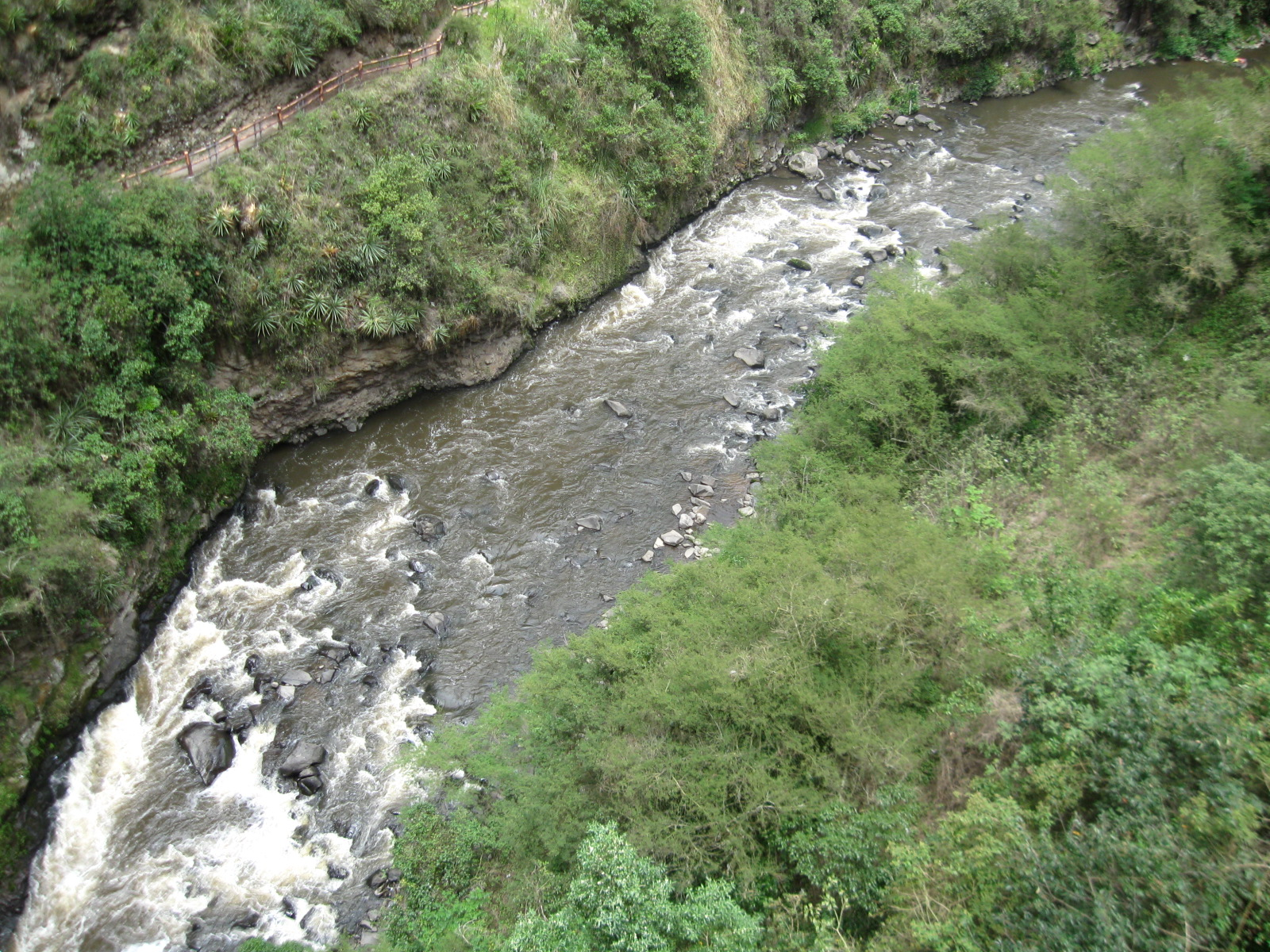
Guáytara (name quechua)

Consists of three major watersheds: Jácome Benavides, Julio and others. Diagnosis municipal Ipiales.

1. Guáitara River Basin, and its tributaries: Boqueron River in the upper part is broken Doña Juana Blanco River, Carchi, Morro broken, or Pulcas Teques, Orejuela, El Rosario, Cutuaquer. Bishop Mejía says, "but no river Guaytara explored more in our land and dug more in our soul."; Mejia Mejia, JC Villaviciosa Hatunllacta province. "River engineer" for its dramatic chasms, its spectacular canyon and beautiful landscapes in their journey of 135 miles to its mouth in the Patia River.
2. Chingual River Basin, which in its upper part is broken or Chúnquer Pun, and San Francisco River tributaries, Green, Yamués, The Cultún.
3. San Miguel River Basin, and its tributaries: River Churuyaco, Sapoyaco, Rumiyaco, Kerosene, Lora, Rancheria.

=== Climate ===
Ipiales features an unusually cool subtropical highland climate (Köppen Cfb), with an average temperature around 15 °C or 27 °F cooler than its near equatorial climate might suggest, due to the city's high altitude of almost 3,000 metres (9,800 ft) above sea level, which makes it the highest major city in Colombia and one of the highest on Earth. The average temperature is cold for a subtropical highland climate with the city escaping an ETH (alpine) classification by less than 1.5 °C or 2.7 °F. Temperatures rarely break the 20 °C (68 °F) mark or fall below freezing, giving the city perpetual spring-like weather. Ipiales has a rainier season from October to May and a drier season from June through September. Rainfall is frequent though not heavy year round, falling on an average of 235 days for an annual total of approximately 925 millimetres or 36 inches.

Climate data for Ipiales (San Luis Airport), elevation 2,961 m (9,715 ft), (1981–2010)
Month	Jan	Feb	Mar	Apr	May	Jun	Jul	Aug	Sep	Oct	Nov	Dec	Year
Mean daily maximum °C (°F)	16.3 (61.3)	16.4 (61.5)	16.3 (61.3)	16.4 (61.5)	16.0 (60.8)	15.1 (59.2)	14.6 (58.3)	14.9 (58.8)	15.9 (60.6)	16.8 (62.2)	16.9 (62.4)	16.6 (61.9)	16.0 (60.8)
Daily mean °C (°F)	11.2 (52.2)	11.3 (52.3)	11.4 (52.5)	11.4 (52.5)	11.3 (52.3)	10.6 (51.1)	10.0 (50.0)	10.0 (50.0)	10.5 (50.9)	11.1 (52.0)	11.4 (52.5)	11.3 (52.3)	11.0 (51.8)
Mean daily minimum °C (°F)	5.8 (42.4)	6.0 (42.8)	6.4 (43.5)	6.6 (43.9)	6.6 (43.9)	6.0 (42.8)	5.1 (41.2)	4.6 (40.3)	4.6 (40.3)	5.6 (42.1)	6.2 (43.2)	6.2 (43.2)	5.8 (42.4)
Average precipitation mm (inches)	73.9 (2.91)	71.7 (2.82)	95.2 (3.75)	102.1 (4.02)	82.5 (3.25)	51.4 (2.02)	40.5 (1.59)	31.7 (1.25)	42.6 (1.68)	84.9 (3.34)	100.9 (3.97)	97.2 (3.83)	874.6 (34.43)
Average precipitation days	19	18	20	21	22	22	20	18	17	19	20	21	236
Average relative humidity (%)	83	83	84	85	85	85	84	82	81	82	83	84	83
Mean monthly sunshine hours	133.3	107.3	99.2	111.0	127.1	129.0	139.5	139.5	129.0	130.2	123.0	130.2	1,498.3
Mean daily sunshine hours	4.3	3.8	3.2	3.7	4.1	4.3	4.5	4.5	4.3	4.2	4.1	4.2	4.1
Source: Instituto de Hidrologia Meteorologia y Estudios Ambientales
