= Chiles (volcano) =

Volcano in Colombia and Ecuador

- Volcán Chiles
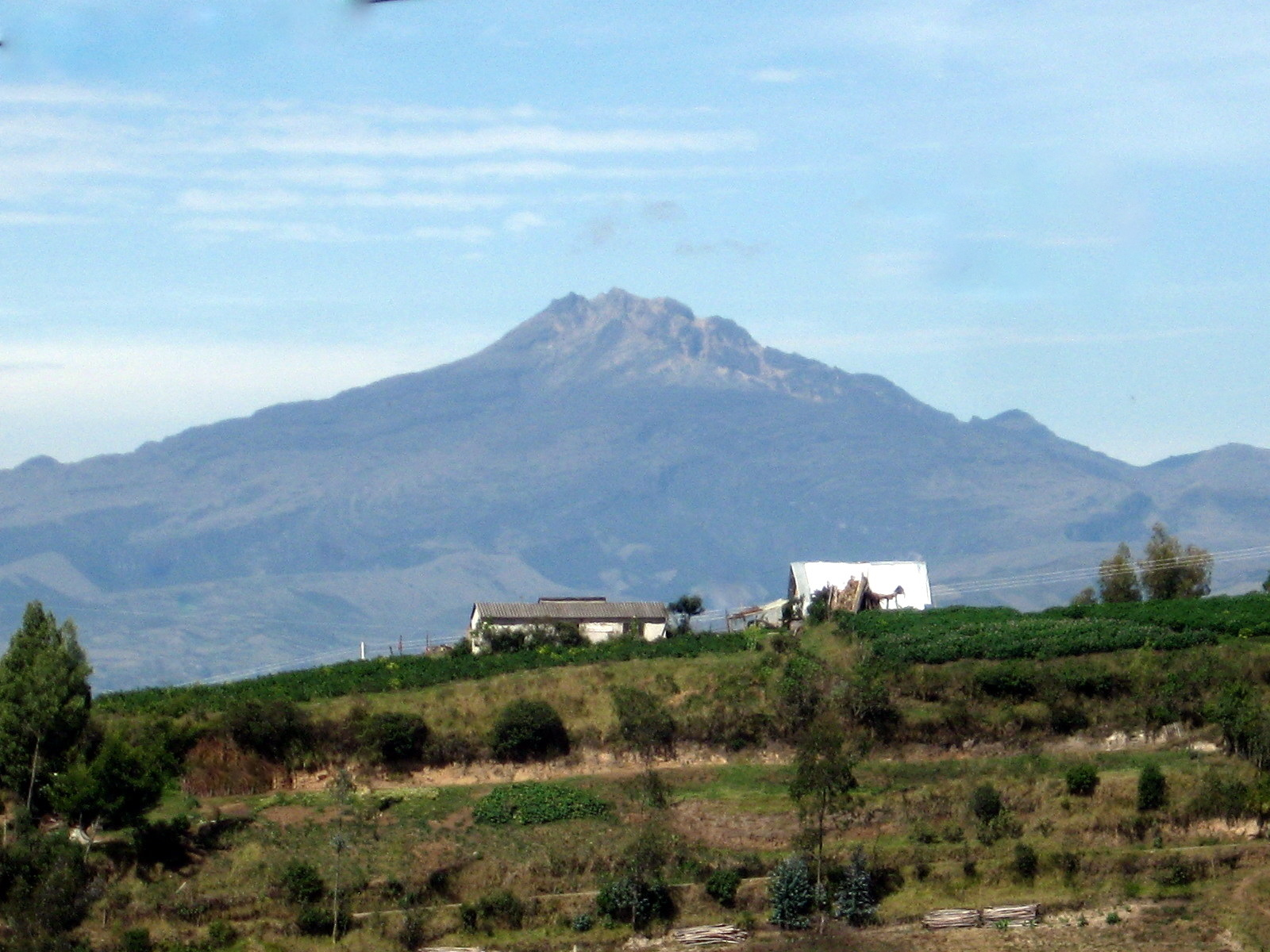
- Chiles in 2010

Highest point
- Elevation: 4,698 m (15,413 ft)
- Listing: Volcanoes of Colombia; Volcanoes of Ecuador
- Coordinates: 0°49′16″N 77°56′6″W

Geography
- Location within Ecuador
- Location: Nariño, Colombia; Carchi, Ecuador
- Parent range: Central Ranges; Cordillera Real; Andes

Geology
- Rock age: Pleistocene
- Mountain type: Andesitic stratovolcano
- Volcanic belt: Northern Volcanic Zone, Andean Volcanic Belt
- Last eruption: July 17, 1936(?)

Climbing
- Easiest route: Ecuador side - Class 3 scramble

Chiles is a volcano on the border of Colombia and Ecuador. It lies 3 kilometres (2 mi) south-east of the volcano Cerro Negro de Mayasquer, and the two peaks are considered part of the same Chiles-Cerro Negro volcanic complex. The volcanoes, together with the Cumbal are andesitic in rock type. A 1936 eruption reported by the Colombian government agency Ingeominas may have been from the Ecuadorean volcano Reventador, otherwise the volcano has not erupted for around 160,000 years.

== Recent activity ==
On 20 October 2014, the Servicio Geológico Colombiano (SGC) reported that a M 5.8 earthquake, the largest to date, occurred in the vicinity of the Cerro Negro de Mayasquer and Chiles volcanoes at a depth of less than 10 km. The event was felt to the north in Pasto, Colombia, and to the south in Quito, Ecuador.

On 21 October 2014 SGC raised the alert level for the volcanic complex to orange (level 3 of 4) noting that a seismic swarm characterized by 4,300 earthquakes was detected in an 18-hour period. Hypocenters were located 1–4 km southwest of Chiles volcano at depths of 3–5 km and local magnitudes between M 0.2 and 4.5. Inhabitants felt 11 of the events. On 22 October a report noted that the total number of earthquakes recorded on 21 October 2014 reached 7,717, which was the largest number of earthquakes recorded on one day since the installation of a local seismic network in November 2013. Several swarms have occurred in the area since February 2013. By the end of November 2014 over 132,000 earthquakes occurred within a narrow area .5 – 6 km SW of the summit of Chiles.

== Associated hydrothermal systems ==
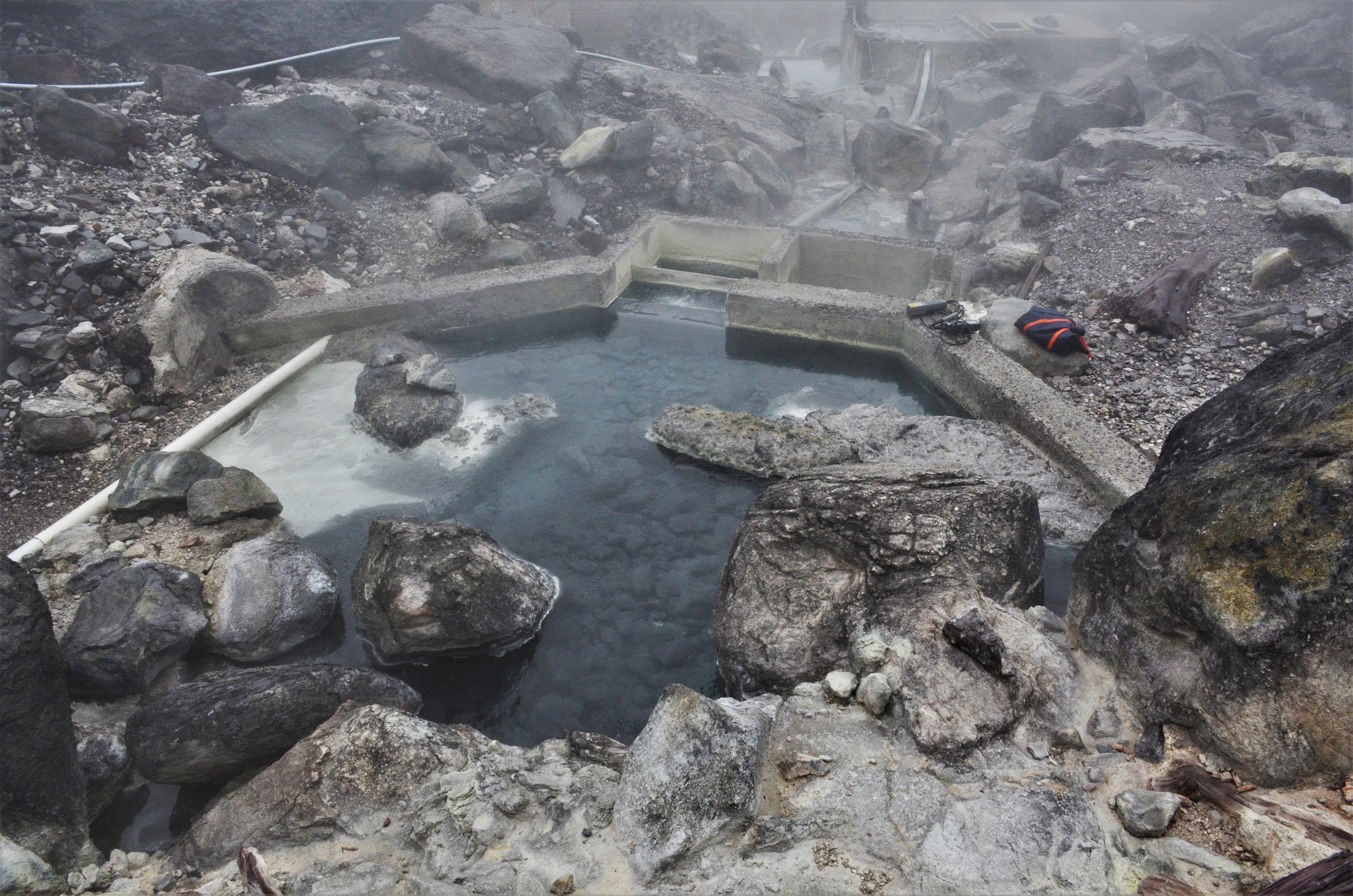
Aguas Hediondas spring in 2018

The Chiles-Cerro Negro volcanic complex has least two associated hydrothermal areas that produce hot springs. The Aguas Hediondas spring is located in 2 miles (3.2 km) to the east of the volcano summit in Ecuador a few hundred meters from the border with Colombia. This location is noted for its intense sulfur odor (Aguas Hediondas translates to smelly waters), a consequence of exceptionally high level of hydrogen sulfide dissolved in the water. The hydrogen sulfide was measured by students at Yachay Tech and determined to be 154 mg/L, which is among the highest even measured in a terrestrial hot spring. The pH of this spring was measured at 4.5, and is one of the only acidic hot springs in Ecuador. The other hot springs group, called Aguas Termales de Tufiño, are located five miles to the east of the summit on the Colombia side of the border. These springs are compositionally distinct from Aguas Hediondas, with most springs having a neutral pH and negligible concentrations of hydrogen sulfide. There are commercial bathing pools at this location. The owners of these pools reported to Yachay Tech professors that the October 2014 Chiles-Cerro Negro earthquake swarm resulted in a visible change the water color that lasted several days before returning to the previous composition.

== Gallery ==
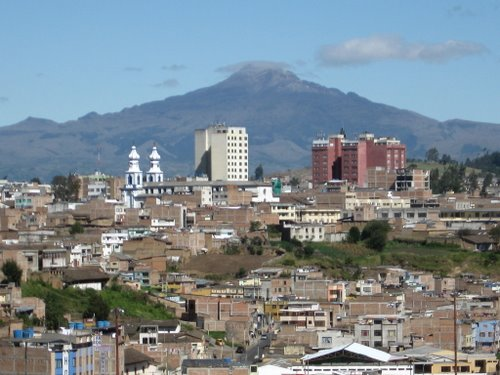
2013

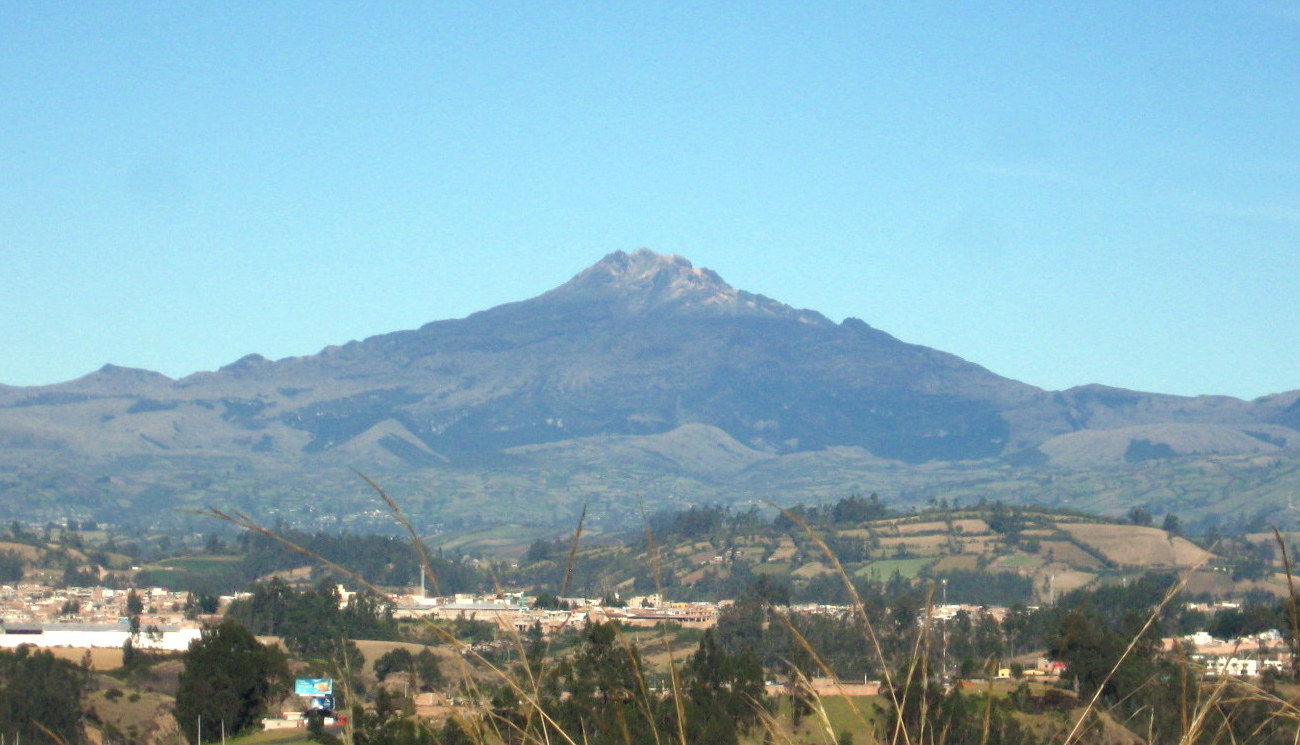
2015

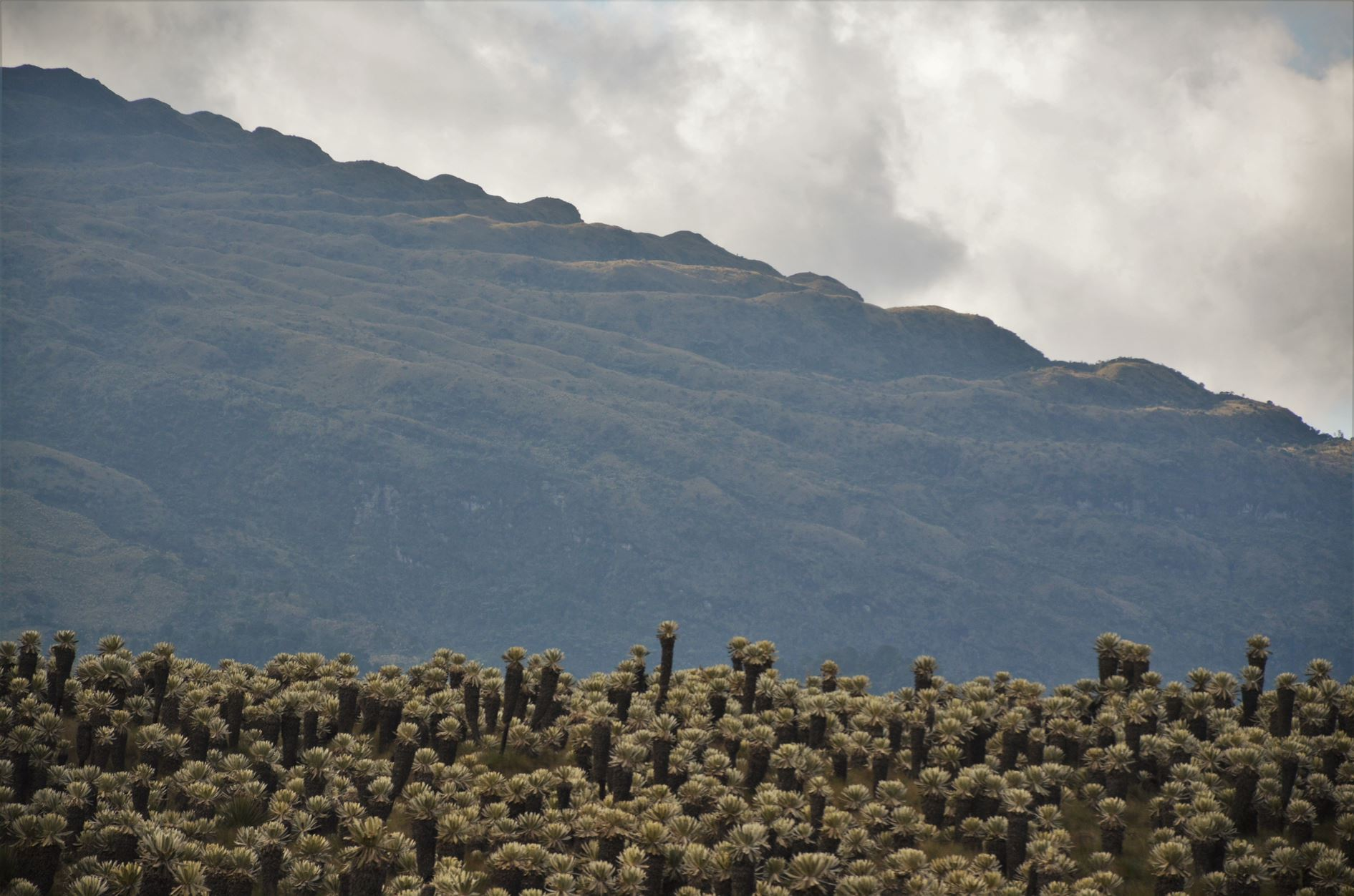
Eastern flank in 2018

== See also ==
- List of volcanoes in Colombia
- List of volcanoes in Ecuador
- List of volcanoes by elevation
- List of mountains in Colombia
