= Hydrography of Colombia =

A map of the main rivers in Colombia

Colombia has an extensive and diverse hydrographic system. Its principal rivers include the Magdalena, Amazonas, Cauca, Guaviare, Putumayo, and Caquetá. Until 1990, Colombia ranked fourth globally in terms of water volume per unit area, only ranking behind Russia, Canada, and Brazil. At that time, it had about 60 liters per square kilometer, six times the global average and three times the average for South America. However, within just a few years, this abundance declined sharply, and by 1996 Colombia had dropped to 17th place worldwide in water availability per unit area. A major factor contributing to this environmental decline is widespread deforestation. It is estimated that every six months, a river in Colombia disappears as a result of tree loss.

== Hydrographic zones ==
At Colombia's highest elevations, three main bioclimatic zones occur: the glacial zone (permanent snow and ice), the páramo, and the upper Andean zone. These closely correspond to high-mountain landforms shaped by glacial and periglacial processes, as well as unstable upper Andean terrain.

These regions are the country's principal sources of freshwater, mainly located in the Andes and the Sierra Nevada de Santa Marta. The most important hydrographic centers include the Colombian Massif, the Nudo de los Pastos, Cerro de Caramanta, the Nudo de Paramillo, the Sumapaz Páramo, the Guachaneque Páramo, the Nudo de Santurbán, and the glacial and páramo systems of the Sierra Nevada de Santa Marta.

=== Colombian Massif ===
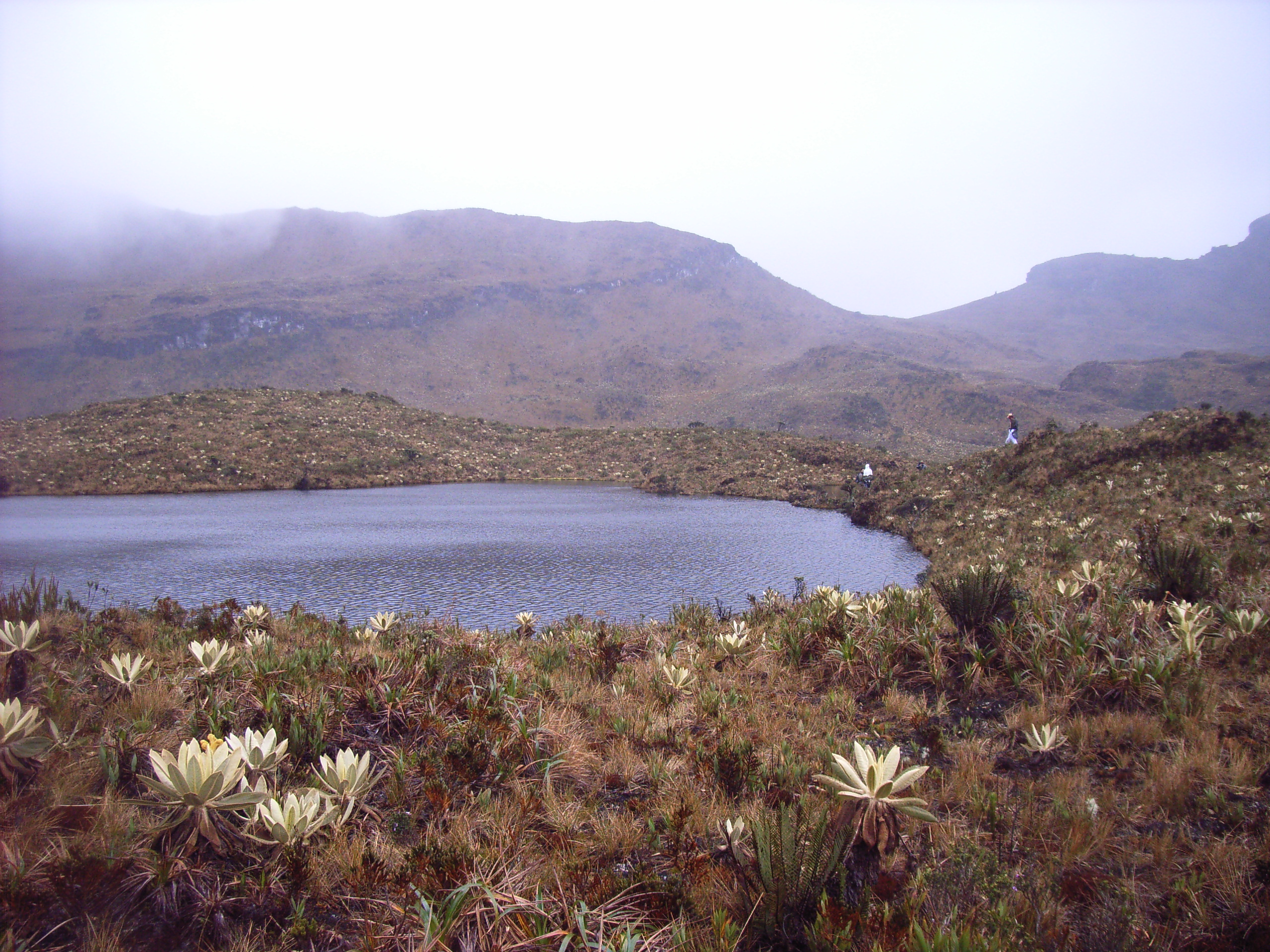
The Las Reginas lagoon in the Colombian Massif.

The Colombian Massif, also known as the Nudo de Almaguer, covers approximately 326,823.7 km^{2} and spans the departments of Cauca, Huila, Nariño, Putumayo, Tolima, and Caquetá. It is the country's most important source of freshwater, as it is where major rivers such as the Magdalena, Cauca, Patía, and Caquetá originate.

The region contains around 65 lagoons, including El Buey (64 hectares), San Rafael (26.5 hectares), Los Andes (24.7 hectares), San Patricio (20.2 hectares), Santiago (12.2 hectares), La Magdalena (7.2 hectares), Cuasiyaco (6.2 hectares), and Rionegro (3.5 hectares). It also includes more than 15 páramos, such as Barbillas, Las Papas, Coconucos, Yunquillo, Moras, and El Letrero. Altogether, these páramo ecosystems cover about 257,000 hectares and are surrounded by extensive high-Andean forests (about 1,350,000 hectares) and remnants of cloud forest vegetation.

UNESCO has recognized the Colombian Massif as a World Biosphere Reserve due to its ecological significance.

=== Nudo de los Pastos ===
The Nudo de los Pastos ("Knot of the Pastures") is located in the southern part of the department of Nariño, near the border with Ecuador. It marks the beginning of Colombia's Andean region, where the Western and Central mountain ranges branch off. This area is the source of important rivers such as the Putumayo and Mira, as well as several tributaries of the Patía river. It is also home to one of Colombia's largest lagoons, La Cocha Lagoon, which lies at an altitude of 2,760 meters and covers more than 40 square kilometers, with a length of about 25 kilometers.

=== Cerro de Caramanta ===
Located in the Eastern Mountain Range at an altitude of 3,900 meters above sea level, this area is the source of the San Juan, San Juan Antioqueño, and Risaralda rivers, as well as several tributaries of the Atrato River.

=== Nudo de Paramillo ===
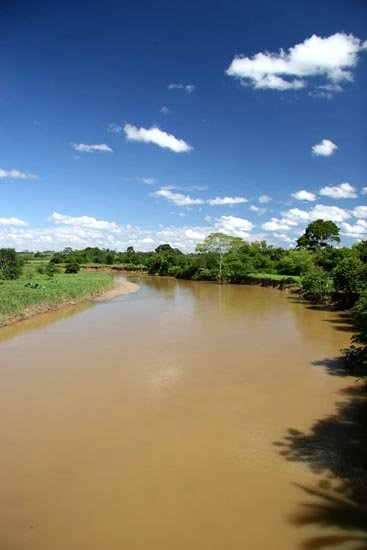
The San Jorge river.

The Nudo de Paramillo ("Paramillo Knot") is located between the departments of Antioquia and Córdoba. Here, the Western Mountain Range splits into three branches that extend toward the Atlantic coast (the Abibe, San Jerónimo, and Ayapel wildlands) giving rise to the Sinú, León, San Jorge, and Riosucio rivers.

=== Sumapaz Páramo ===
The Sumapaz Páramo is located in the Eastern Mountain Range, south of the department of Cundinamarca. It gives rise to several tributaries of the Meta and Guaviare rivers, as well as tributaries of the Cabrera and Sumapaz rivers, which flow into the Magdalena River. To its north lies the Guachaneque Páramo.

=== Guachaneque Páramo ===
Also located in the Eastern Mountain Range in Cundinamarca, this is where rivers such as the Bogotá, Upía, Sogamoso, Blanco, Guatiquía, Negro, and Opón originate.

=== Nudo de Santurbán ===
The Nudo de Santurbán ("Santurbán Knot") is a high point in the Eastern Andes where the Sierra de Mérida begins toward Venezuela, in the region of Santander. Several rivers originate here, including the Zulia and Lebrija, along with other tributaries that feed into the Catatumbo and Arauca rivers.

=== Sierra Nevada de Santa Marta ===
In the isolated mountain system of the Sierra Nevada de Santa Marta, several rivers originate, including the Cesar, Ranchería, Aracataca, Fundación, and Ariguaní, along with many of their tributaries, such as the Guatapurí River. Most of these rivers flow into the Caribbean Sea or feed major water systems like the Ciénaga Grande de Santa Marta and the Magdalena River. Remarkably, the snow-capped peaks of the Sierra Nevada rise just 42 kilometers from the Caribbean coast. Overall, this mountain range is the source of 35 watersheds.

== Basins ==
In Colombia, rivers are organized into five major hydrographic basins or slopes: the Caribbean, Pacific, Amazon, Orinoco, and Catatumbo.

=== Caribbean slope ===
The Caribbean Slope.

The Caribbean (or Atlantic) slope covers about 363,878 km^{2}. It includes several major basins, including the Magdalena–Cauca system (270,000 km^{2}), the Atrato River basin (45,000 km^{2}), the basins of the Sierra Nevada de Santa Marta and La Guajira (30,000 km^{2}), and the Sinú River basin (17,000 km^{2}).

=== Pacific slope ===
The Pacific slope extends over roughly 88,000 km^{2}. Its main basins are the Patía River (24,000 km^{2}), the San Juan River (20,000 km^{2}), the Mira River (11,000 km^{2}), and the Baudó River (8,000 km^{2}), along with smaller basins such as the Micay and Guapi, which together account for about 25,000 km^{2}.

=== Amazon slope ===
This is the largest hydrographic region in the world, of which about 332,000 km^{2} lies within Colombia. Its main basins include the Caquetá River (200,000 km^{2}), the Colombian section of the Putumayo River (79,000 km^{2}), and the Vaupés River (38,000 km^{2}), along with smaller basins covering about 53,000 km^{2}.

=== Orinoco slope ===
The Orinoco (Orinoquia) slope covers approximately 328,000 km^{2}. It includes the Guaviare River basin (140,000 km^{2}), the Meta River (112,000 km^{2}), the Vichada River (26,000 km^{2}), the Tomo River (20,000 km^{2}), and the Colombian portion of the Arauca River (8,000 km^{2}), plus smaller basins totaling around 22,000 km^{2}. The major rivers here, including the Orinoco, Guaviare, and Meta, originate in the Eastern Cordillera and flow into the plains, creating extensive floodplains.

=== Catatumbo slope ===
The Catatumbo slope covers around 18,700 km^{2} and drains into Lake Maracaibo. Its principal basins include the Colombian portion of the Zulia River (4,800 km^{2}) and the Sardinata River (3,400 km^{2}), along with other smaller basins. This region is largely covered by dense forest rich in biodiversity, and its main rivers include the Zulia, Río de Oro, Tarra, Sardinata, Táchira, Cucutilla, San Miguel, and Presidente.

== Lagoons ==
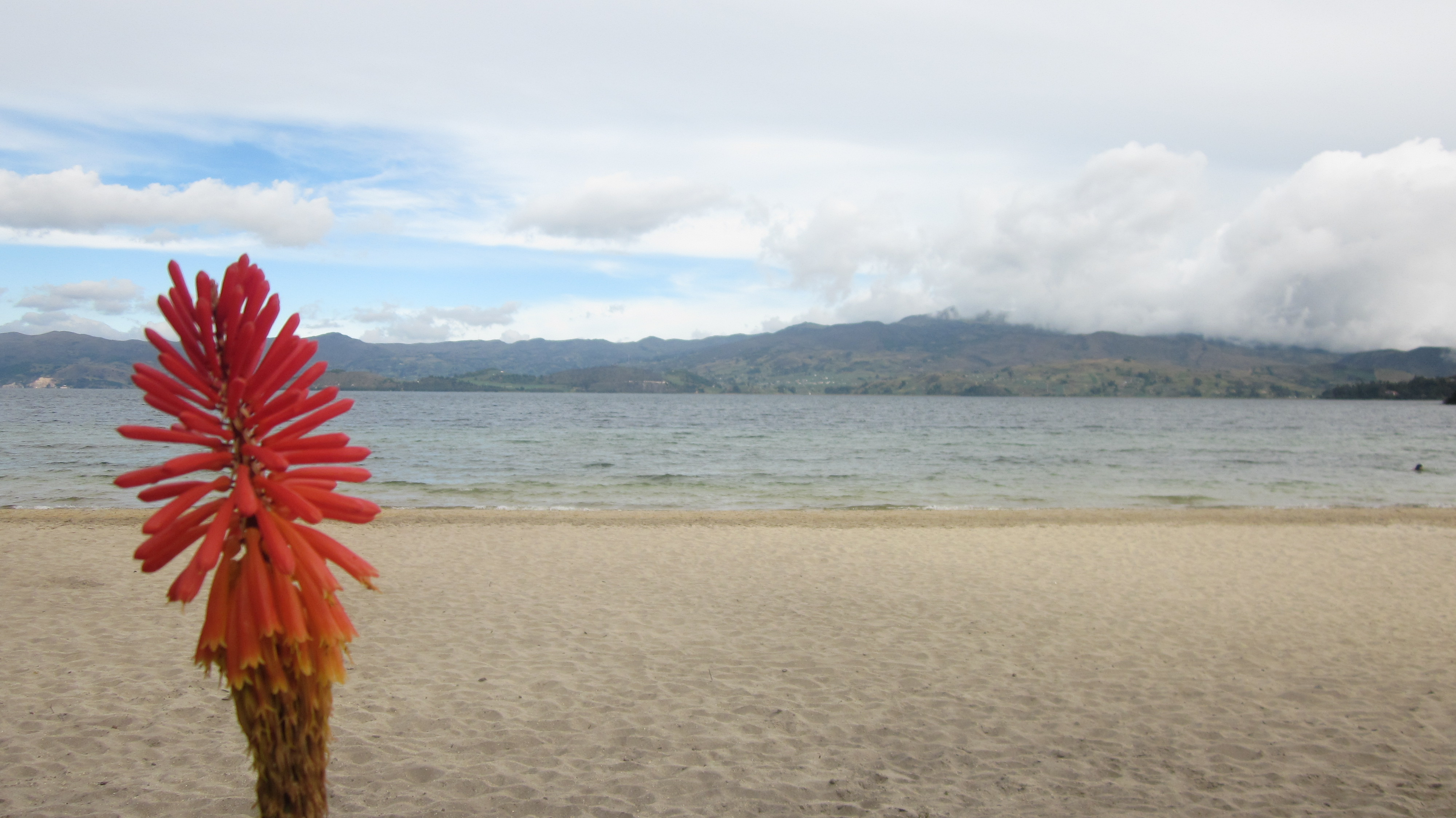
Playa Blanca in Lake Tota.

Colombia has few natural large lakes. Instead, most of its inland water bodies in the Andes are classified as lagoons due to their relatively small size. Among the largest are Lake Tota, located at 3,115 meters above sea level in Boyacá, and La Cocha Lagoon, situated at 2,660 meters in Nariño. In Cundinamarca, the Fúquene Lagoon stands out, while other notable bodies of water include the Suesca and Guatavita lagoons, both of which are also of significant geographical and cultural importance.
