= List of rivers of Colombia =

Map of Colombia showing major rivers

== Atlantic Ocean ==
=== Amazon River Basin ===
Map of the Amazon River drainage basin with the Amazon River highlighted

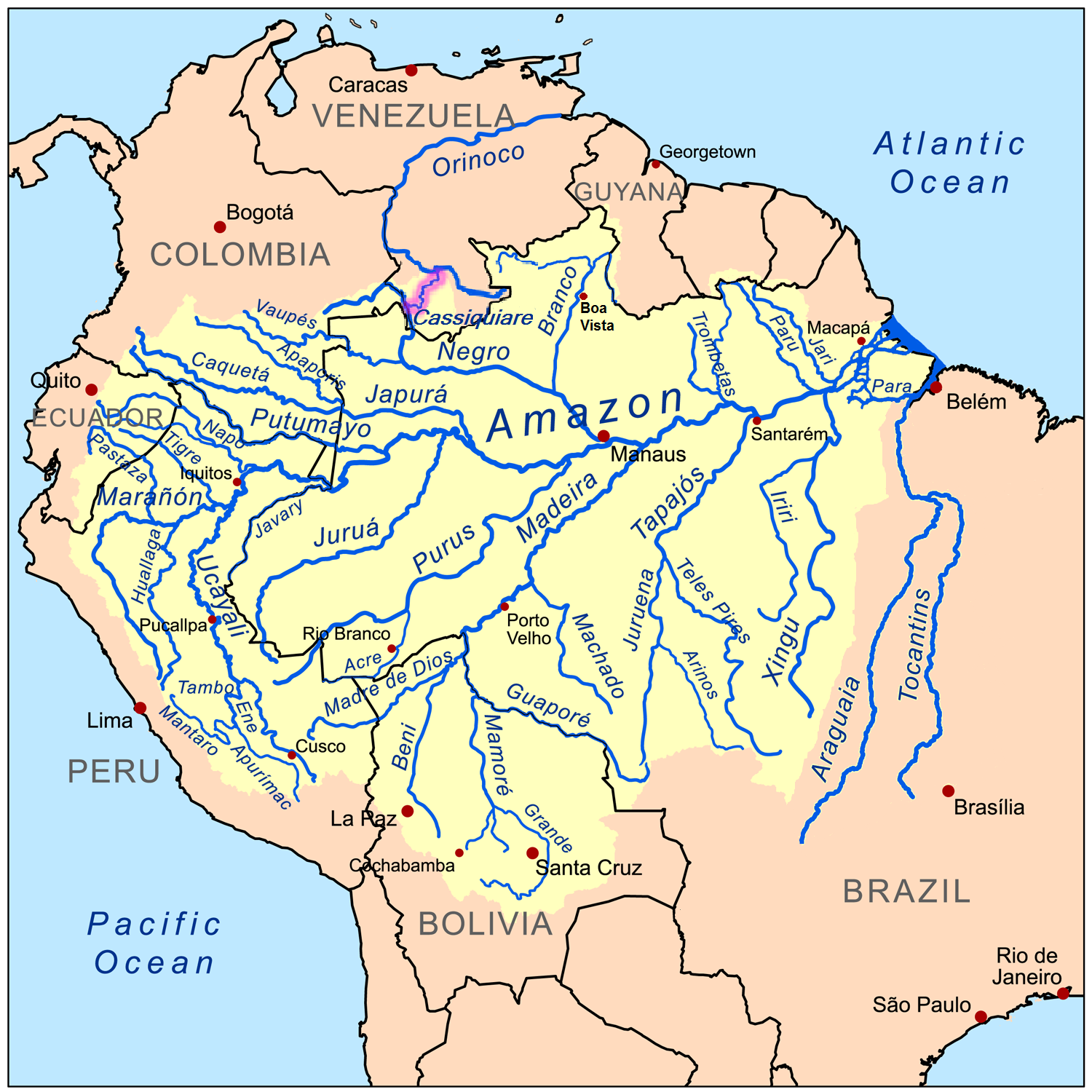
The Amazon River drainage basin; with the Casiquiare River, a distributary of the Orinoco River flowing southward into the Negro River, in Venezuela, South America. As such, it forms a unique natural canal between the Orinoco and Amazon river systems. That links two major river systems, a so-called bifurcation.

- Amazon River
  - Guainía River or Negro River
    - Vaupés River or Uaupés River
      - Papuri River
      - Querary River
    - Isana River or Içana River
      - Cuiari River
    - Aquio River
  - Caquetá River or Japurá River
    - Purui River
    - Apaporis River
      - Traíra River or Taraira River
      - Tunia River
      - Ajajú River
    - Miritiparaná River
    - Cahuinari River
    - Yarí River
    - Caguán River
      - Guayas River
    - Mecaya River
    - Orteguaza River
  - Putumayo River or Içá River
    - Cotuhé River
    - Igara Paraná River
    - Cara Paraná River
    - San Miguel River
    - Guamués River

=== Orinoco River Basin ===
The Orinoco drainage basin

- Orinoco River
  - Apure River (Venezuela)
    - Uribante River
      - Torbes River
    - Sarare River
  - Arauca River
  - Capanaparo River
  - Cinaruco River
  - Meta River
    - Vita River
    - Casanare River
      - Ariporo River
      - Cravo Norte River
    - Guachiría River
    - Pauto River
    - Cravo Sur River
    - Cusiana River
    - Manacacías River
    - Metica River
      - Guayuriba River
    - Upía River
      - Guavio River
      - Lengupá River
  - Tomo River
  - Tuparro River
  - Vichada River
  - Guaviare River
    - Inírida River
      - Papunáua River
    - Uvá River
    - Ariari River
      - Güejar River
    - Guayabero River
      - Duda River
      - Losada River

=== Lake Maracaibo ===
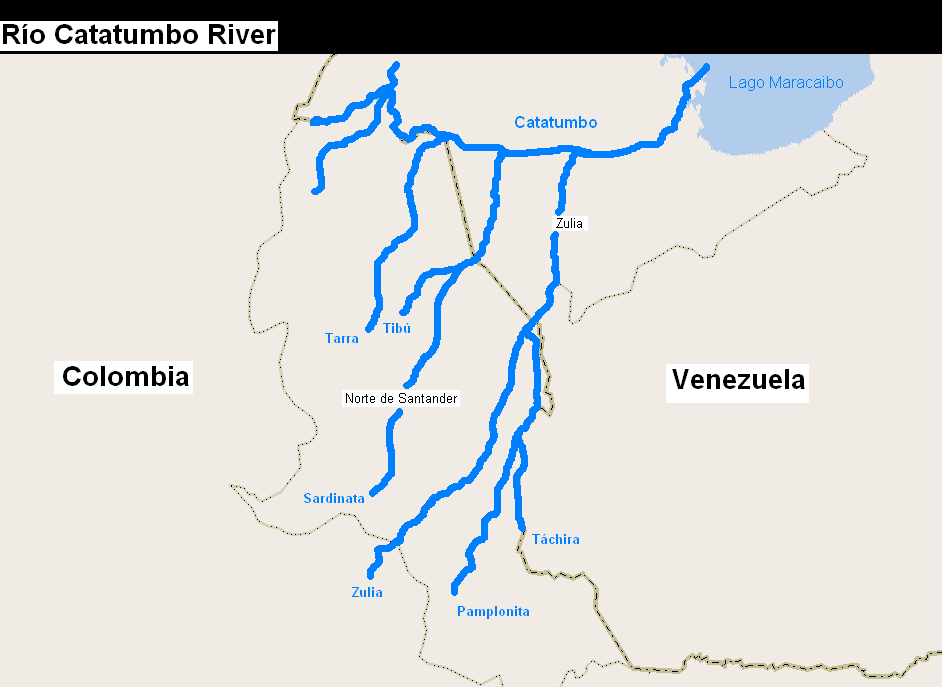
Tributaries of the Catatumbo River and Lake Maracaibo

- Catatumbo River
  - Zulia River
    - Pamplonita River
      - Táchira River
  - Tibú River
    - Sardinata River
  - Tarra River
  - Río de Oro

=== Caribbean Sea ===
- Atrato River
  - Salaqúí River
  - Sucio River
  - Bojayá River
  - Murrí River
- Fundación River
- Leon River
- Manzanares River

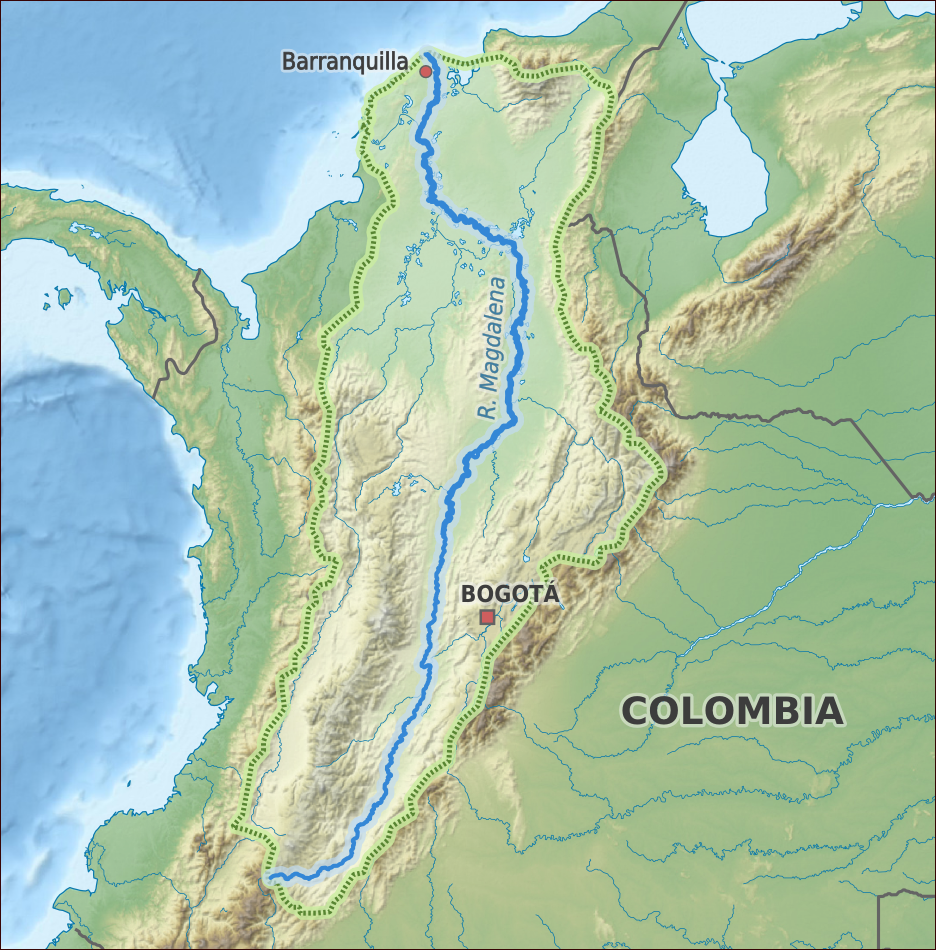
Magdalena River Basin

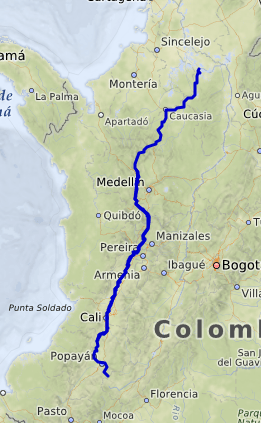
Cauca River course

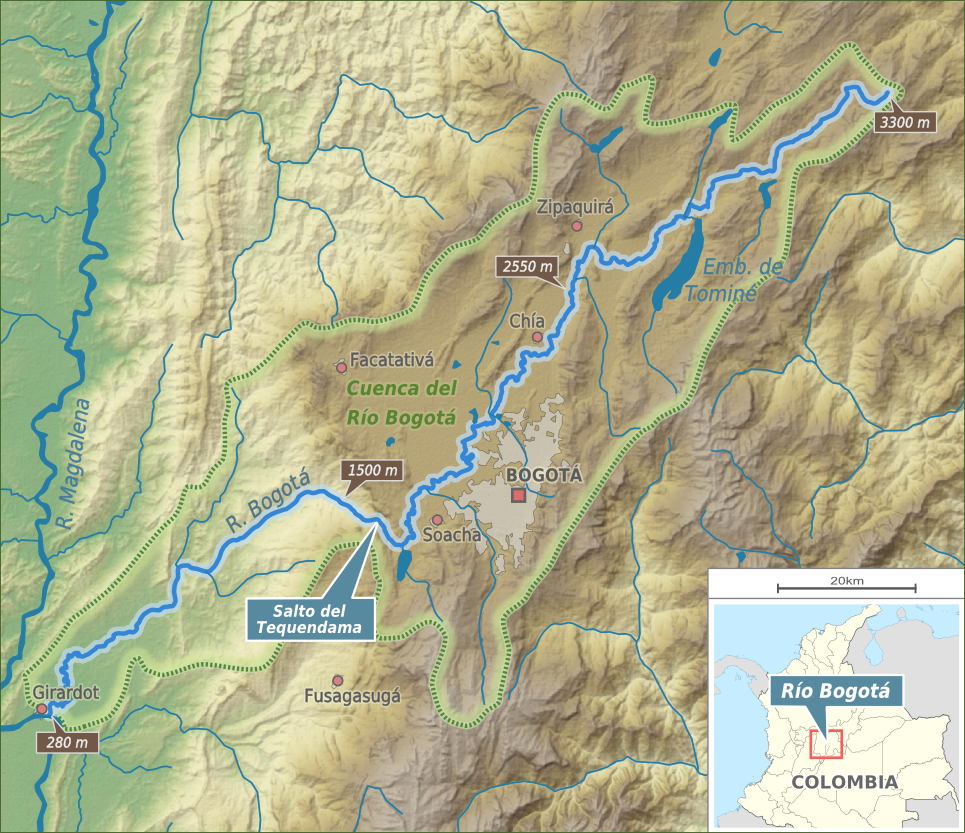
Bogotá River and its drainage basin

< Canal del Dique (Levee Channel) - artificial bifurcation

- Magdalena River
  - San Jorge River
  - Cauca River
    - Nechi River
      - Porce River
        - Medellín River
    - Otun River
    - La Vieja River
      - Quindío River
    - Cali River
    - Jamundí River
      - Pance River
  - Cesar River
    - Ariguaní River
    - Guatapurí River
  - Lebrija River
  - Sogamoso River
    - Chicamocha River
    - Suárez River
  - Opon River
  - Carare River
  - Nare River
  - Samaná Norte River
    - Guatapé River
  - Negro River
  - La Miel River
  - Bogotá River
    - Apulo River
    - Soacha River
    - Balsillas River
      - Bojacá River
        - Subachoque River
    - Tunjuelo River
    - Fucha River
    - Arzobispo River, Juan Amarillo or Salitre
    - Torca River
    - Río Frío
    - Teusacá River
    - Neusa River
  - Sumapaz River
    - Cuja River
      - Guavio River
        - Batán River
  - Coello River
  - Saldaña River
  - Cabrera River
  - Ceibas River
  - Páez River
- Mendihuaca River
- Mulatos River
- Palomino River
- Ranchería River
- Sinú River

== Pacific Ocean ==
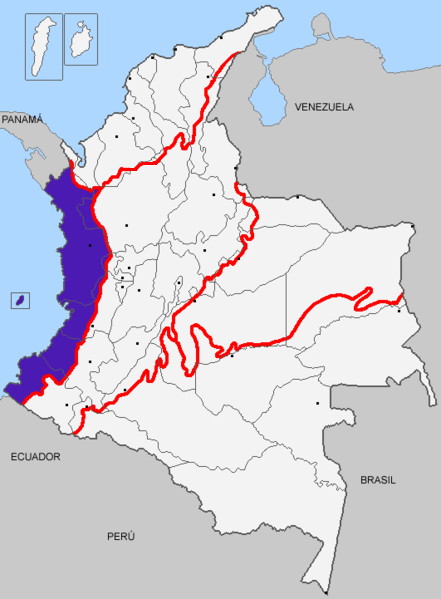
Pacific region in Colombia highlighted

- Baudó River
- San Juan River
- Dagua River
- Anchicayá River
- Yurumanguí River
- San Juan de Micay River
- Iscuandé River
- Tapaje River
- Sanquianga River
- Patía River
  - Telembí River
  - Guáitara River
  - Mayo River
- Mira River
  - Güiza River
  - San Juan River

== See also ==
- List of rivers of the Americas by coastline
