= Borders of Colombia =

Political boundaries between Colombia and neighboring territories

Geography of Colombia
- Colombia borders with its neighbours, since 1810
- Continent: South America
- Area
  - Total: 6,672 km^{2} (2,576 sq mi)
- Coastline: 3,208 km (1,993 mi)
- Borders: Venezuela, Brazil, Peru, Ecuador, Panama

Colombia is located in the northwestern corner of South America, confined between the vast Amazon rainforest and the Atlantic and Pacific oceans, and also crossed by the great Andes mountain range. Due to this territorial conformation, it has both natural and political boundaries; as a complement to the latter definition, there are the so-called borders. The country exercises its sovereignty within the territory comprised by these.

Colombia has 6,342 km^{2} (2,449 sq mi) of land borders and, additionally, has maritime boundaries in the Caribbean Sea and the Pacific Ocean. Its continental territory borders five countries: Venezuela and Brazil to the east, Ecuador and Peru to the south and Panama to the northwest. The maritime boundaries are a little wider: Nicaragua, Costa Rica, the Dominican Republic, Haiti, Honduras, Panama, Venezuela and Jamaica in the Caribbean; Ecuador, Panama and Costa Rica in the Pacific.

== History ==
The history of the definition of the boundaries of Colombia begins in 1819, the year in which the country achieved complete independence, and the principle on which subsequent negotiations to establish the country's boundaries with its neighbours were based. This unequivocal starting point was the uti possidetis iuris of 1810, which referred to the territory that the Viceroyalty of New Granada possessed in that year.

During the 19th century, Colombia in each of its constitutions defined its boundaries as the same ones that in 1810 divided the territory of the Viceroyalty of New Granada from that of the general captaincies of Venezuela and Guatemala, and from the territory of the Portuguese possessions of Brazil. However, the boundaries with neighbouring countries were never formally delineated and were a point of controversy.

The uti possidetis represented the diplomatic formula used between South American nations to define boundaries or settle conflicts between neighbouring nations, which may be belligerents. Taking the principle of uti possidetis iuris as a basis, Colombia negotiated boundaries with Venezuela, Costa Rica (when they were still bordering countries), Ecuador and Peru, while another principle was applied with Brazil: the uti possidetis de facto, according to which that country required that the border continue as far as where its nationals owned land.

Colombia's current land borders were defined by several treaties, most of which are still in force. These treaties usually determine the limits of the country's continental space by means of mountains, rivers or other geographical features, which delimit the extent to which the countries included in these agreements can exercise their sovereignty.

== Land borders ==
The borders in the following table are listed by country, starting from the north-east and running around Colombia clockwise:

Country	Length (km)	Border departments
Venezuela	2219	La Guajira, Cesar, Norte de Santander, Boyacá, Arauca, Vichada, Guainía
Brazil	1645	Guainía, Vaupés, Amazonas
Perú	1626	Amazonas, Putumayo
Ecuador	586	Putumayo, Nariño
Panama	266	Chocó

=== Brazil ===
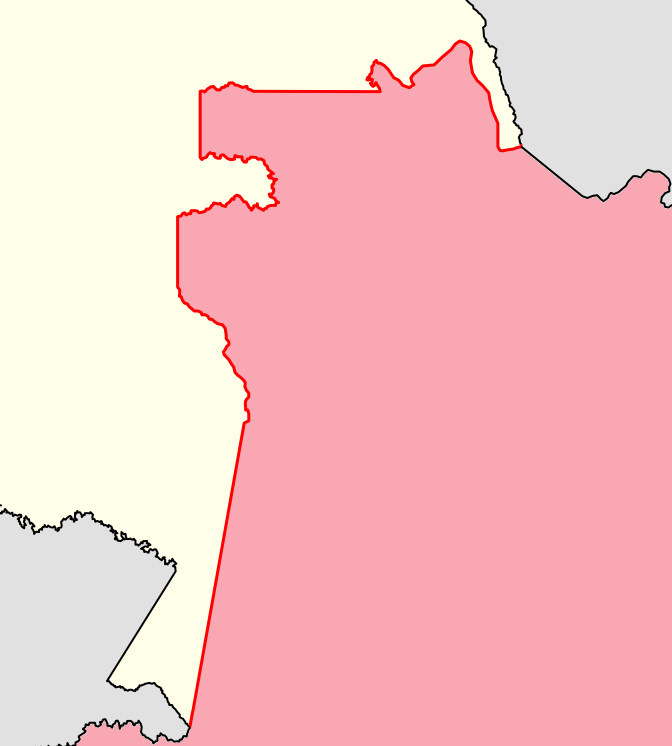
Border between Brazil and Colombia.

The border with Brazil has a total of 1,645 km (1,022 mi), making it the second longest in Colombia, and the first to be definitively delimited by treaties. The border begins in the south, at the mouth of the San Antonio stream in the Amazon River near the city of Leticia, continues in a straight line north to the mouth of the Apaporis River in Caquetá, from there along the course of this river until it meets the Taraira River, which it goes up to its headwaters; from here to the north in a straight line to the Papurí River, and along this to the Vaupés upstream to the Querarí River which along another meridian goes north to the Isana River, then continues along the Naquén mountain range until it meets the island of San José in the Negro River.

The departments that form part of this border are Amazonas, Guainía and Vaupés. Because it runs through a large strip of the Amazon region, this border is mostly inhabited by indigenous peoples from both countries.

The Colombian-Brazilian border is established by two treaties, currently in force:

1. Vásquez Cobo-Martins Treaty: signed in Bogotá on 24 April 1907. The negotiation of this agreement covered the delimitation from the island of San José to the mouth of the Apaporis River in the Caquetá River.
2. García Ortiz-Mangabeira Treaty: After a strong territorial dispute with Ecuador and Peru due to the lack of definition of the Amazonian border since the dissolution of Gran Colombia, an agreement was reached with Brazil. At the end of the negotiations, the treaty was signed in Rio de Janeiro on 15 November 1928, in which issues of boundaries and river navigation were touched upon and which set the border on the Apaporis-Tabatinga line.

=== Ecuador ===
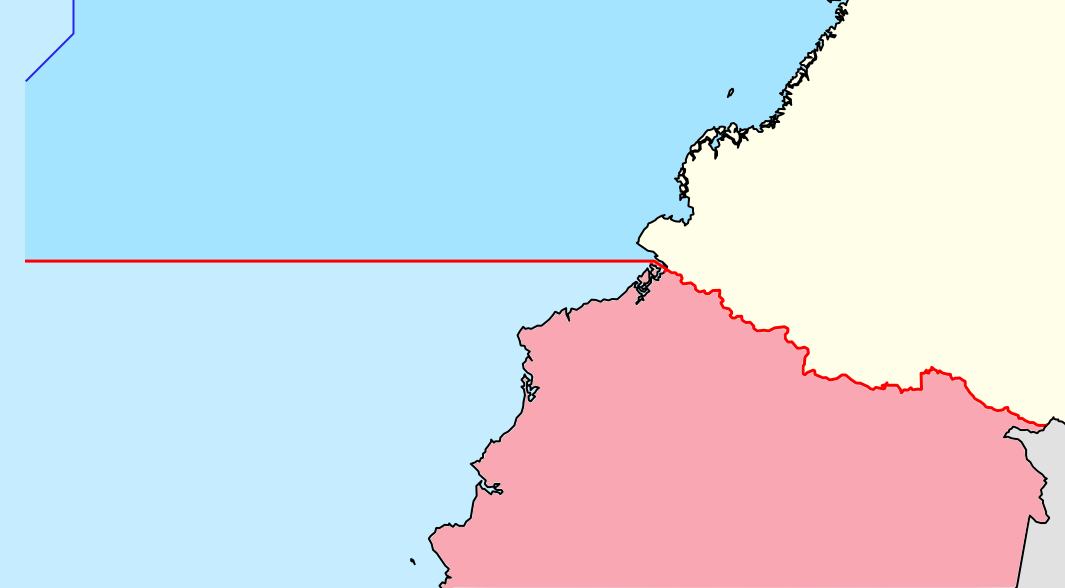
Border between Colombia and Ecuador.

The border with Ecuador is 586 km (364 mi) long, starting at the mouth of the Mataje River in the Pacific Ocean until it reaches the Mira River, and along this until it reaches the San Juan; from here it continues until it reaches the summit of the Chiles Volcano, where it meets the Carchi River and through its course and that of several small rivers it continues until the source of the San Miguel River, which it continues until its confluence with the Putumayo, whose course it runs to the mouth of the Güepí River.

The departments that belong to this border are Nariño and Putumayo. This border, despite its short length, runs through terrains of varied geography, including the Pacific plains, the Andean space and the Amazon.

The boundaries between Ecuador and Colombia began to be negotiated as soon as Gran Colombia was dissolved in 1830. Despite this, it was difficult to reach a layout that was convenient for both parties due to the imprecise limits set by the Spanish Empire during the colonial period, which is why the common border remained in dispute for a long time.

This limit was established thanks to several treaties, of which only the last one signed between both countries remains in force:

1. Treaty of Pasto: signed on 30 May 1833, it only established the limits between both nations in the strip that covers the Nudo de los Pastos.
2. Treaty of Bogotá of 9 July 1856: like its predecessor, it only demarcated a certain sector of the common border between the Pacific Ocean and the Carchi River.
3. Muñoz Vernaza-Suárez Treaty: signed in Bogotá on 15 July 15 1916. This definitive agreement determined the current 586 km (364 mi) of border that separates the two countries.

=== Panama ===
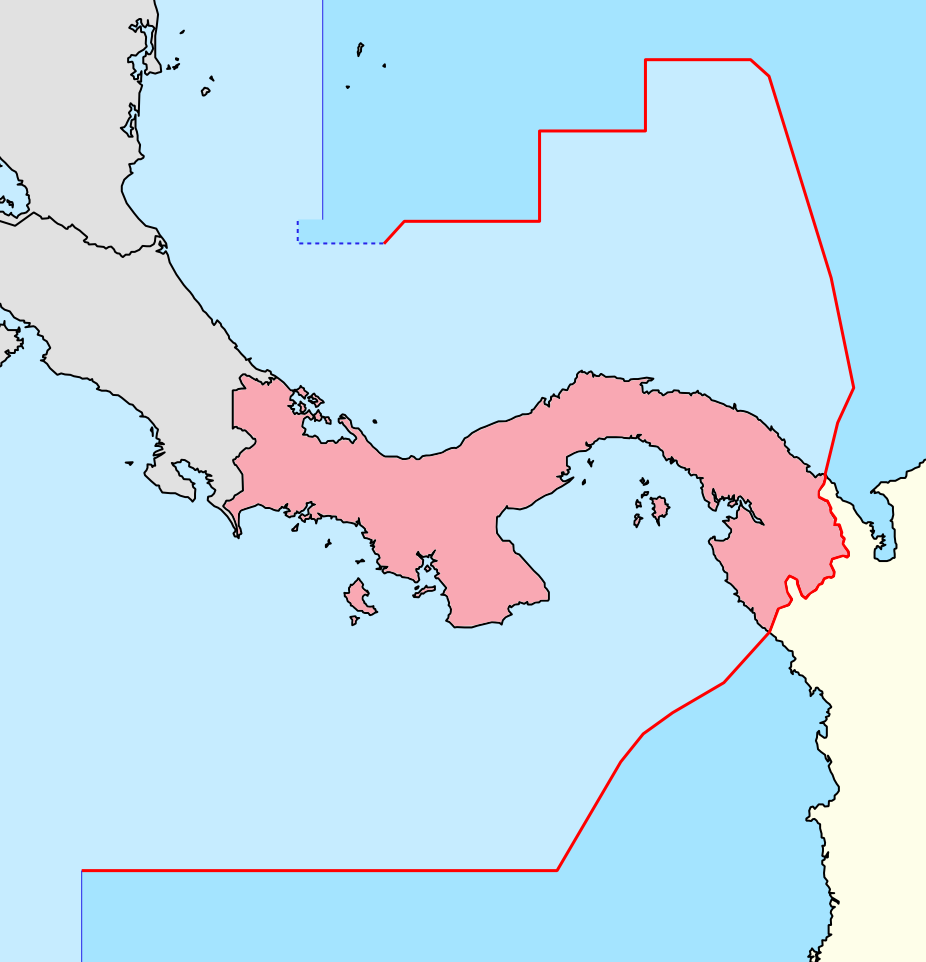
Border between Colombia and Panama.

The border with Panama is the smallest in Colombia's continental territory, with a total of 266 km (165 mi), covering the entire territory between the Cocalito and Ardita points, in the Pacific Ocean, and Cabo Tiburón in the Caribbean Sea. The most peculiar characteristic of this border is that it runs entirely through the Darién region, one of the most inaccessible in South America, with only Chocó as its bordering department.

The Colombian-Panamanian border is established by two treaties:

1. Thomson-Urrutia Treaty: This treaty was signed in Bogotá on 6 April 1914. In this treaty, the United States gave Colombia economic compensation for the separation of Panama, while Colombia accepted full sovereignty of its former department.
2. Vélez-Victoria Treaty: signed in Bogotá on 20 August 1924. This treaty completely determined the delimitation of the borders between the two territories.

=== Peru ===
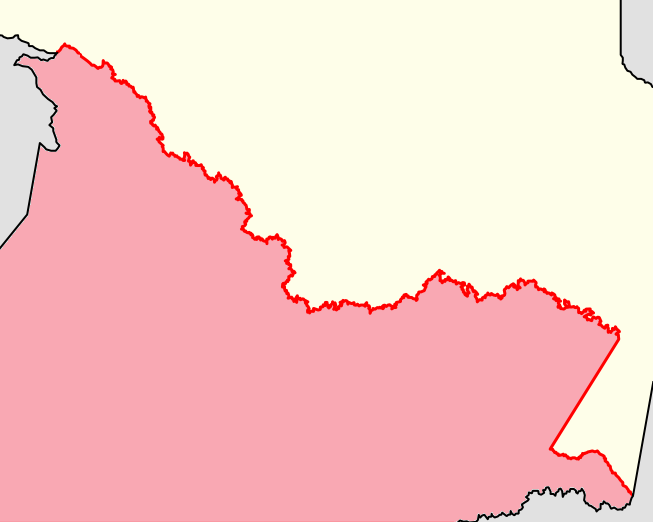
Border between Colombia and Peru.

The border with Peru is 1,626 km (1,010 mi) long, making it the third longest border in Colombia. It begins at the confluence of the Güepí and Putumayo rivers, and runs downstream to the mouth of the Yaguas River, from where it follows a straight line to the mouth of the Atacuari River in the Amazon, and along the course of the latter to the mouth of the San Antonio Creek in Leticia.

The departments belonging to this border are Amazonas and Putumayo. A great exchange of goods between both republics takes place through it. The importance of this border lies in its belonging to the Amazon, a large continental space that contains a lot of fauna and flora. In addition, it is the so-called "lung of the world."

The Colombian-Peruvian border is determined by a treaty and a protocol:

1. Salomón-Lozano Treaty: signed in Lima on 24 March 1922. This treaty determined the entire border between the two countries, which a few years later would be ratified by means of a protocol.
2. Urdaneta-Valencia-Cano and Martua Belande-Ulloa Protocol: signed in Rio de Janeiro on 24 May 1934. It is a protocol that sought friendship and cooperation between the countries. In addition, it ratified the border between the two countries and made a commitment to demilitarise the border.

=== Venezuela ===
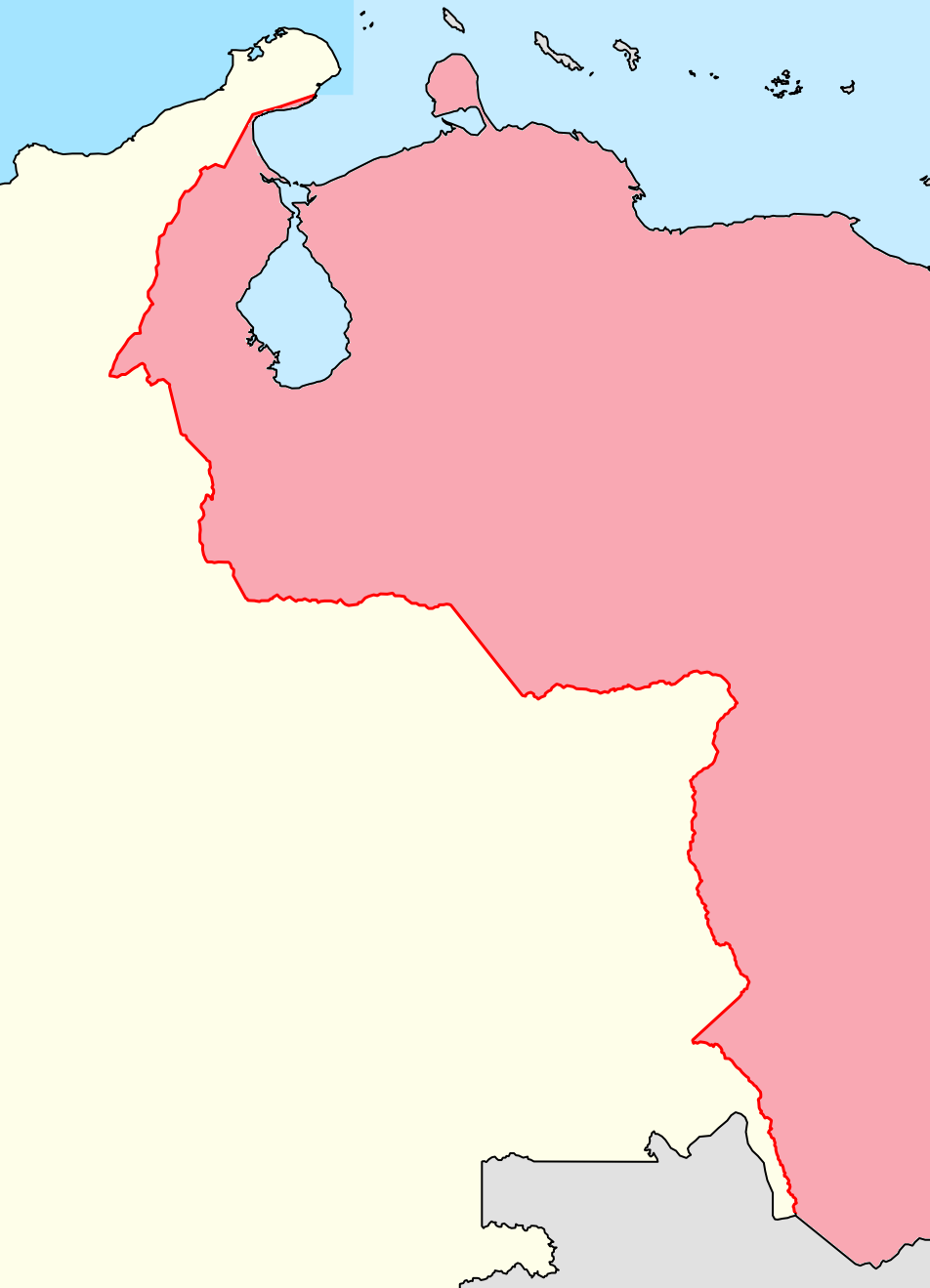
Border between Colombia and Venezuela.

The border with Venezuela has a total of 2,219 km (1,379 mi), making it the longest border that Colombia has with any country. It covers a large territory between La Guajira and Piedra del Cocuy on the Negro River, starting at Cocinetas Bay in the north and going to the Oca Mountains, then along the summit of the Perijá mountain range to the Oro River and along this to Catatumbo, then passing in a straight line through the confluence of the Tarra and Sardinata rivers, and along another straight line that goes to the Grita in Zulia; it continues through the La China, San Pedro and Pamplonita ravines until reaching the Tamá moor, there it finds the source of the Sarare River and along its course to the Arauca river and then runs along the Meta to its mouth in the Orinoco River; this upstream to the Atabapo, passes to the Guainía River and finally reaches San José Island in front of Piedra del Cocuy.

The departments that form part of the border are La Guajira, Cesar, Norte de Santander, Boyacá, Arauca, Vichada y Guainía. Through this border, both countries share two very important continental territories: the Orinoquía, located south of the Arauca River and the basin of Lake Maracaibo, located north of it. This border has been one of the most difficult to draw due to the interests of both nations on the territories it includes, on both sides of the boundary line; it is also one of those with the most social and economic problems.

The Colombian-Venezuelan border is currently delimited by two treaties (the Spanish Arbitration Award of 1891 and the Treaty of 1941), although five of them have been negotiated to date:

1. Michelena-Pombo Treaty: signed in 1833, it determined most of the Colombian-Venezuelan border between La Guajira and the Orinoco River. However, it did not effectively demarcate a large part of the peninsula and for this reason the ratification by Venezuela remained incomplete.
2. Arosemena-Guzmán Treaty: was signed in Caracas on 14 September 1881, through which both parties decided that the Spanish Government would be the one to define the borders of the countries.
3. Spanish Arbitration Award of Queen Maria Cristina: This treaty determined a large part of the borders between the two countries, signed in Madrid by Queen Maria Cristina on 16 March 1891. The territory covered by the Award was: Guajira, Serranías Perijá and Motilones-San Faustino, Serranía Tama-Sarare, Arauca and Meta, Orinoco and Negro Rivers.
4. Judgment of the Swiss Federal Council: signed in Bern on 24 May 1922, it served to determine several parts of the border that the Spanish Arbitration Award of 1881 could not. It covers: San Faustino, Catatumbo, Zulia, Yavita, Pimichin, Arauca and Meta.
5. López de Mesa-Gil Borges Treaty: signed in Villa del Rosario on 5 April 1941, in which the borders between the two countries were finally defined. It provides a solution to the differences in the Río de Oro and in the Sarare region, and concludes the demarcation process.

== Maritime borders ==
Colombia is the only country in South America that has coastlines on the two largest seas in the world (the Atlantic Ocean, in its arm of the Caribbean Sea, and the Pacific Ocean, the largest in the world). That is why its maritime borders exceed even its land borders in extension and number of neighbours. Most of them are measured with respect to the baselines, which are the lines from which Colombia measures the territorial sea, the contiguous zone, the exclusive economic zone and the continental shelf.

The ownership of the islands of San Andrés and Providencia in the Caribbean and the island of Malpelo in the Pacific was resolved by the French Award of 1900, given on the occasion of the treaty of 4 November 1896 signed between Colombia and Costa Rica (when they were still bordering countries on land), which ruled that the islands, islets and banks located in the Atlantic with proximity to the east and southeast coast of Punta Mona were Colombia's, while those located to the west and northwest were Costa Rica's.

The country shares borders with 7 nations in the Caribbean Sea (Costa Rica, Haiti, Honduras, Jamaica, Nicaragua, Panama and the Dominican Republic). Some of these borders are still disputed due to the commercial and economic importance of these waters, as they contain large natural resources (such as oil and fish reserves, among others), but also because they are one of the main entrances and exits for ships in Latin America. The Colombian maritime territory in these waters totals 589,360 km^{2} (227,550 sq mi).

In the Pacific Ocean, Colombia only has borders with three countries (Costa Rica, Ecuador and Panama), all of which are defined by current treaties. The Pacific is the site of a large part of the country's exports and imports of products. Colombia's maritime territory in these waters totals 339.200 km^{2} (130.966 sq mi).

=== Costa Rica ===
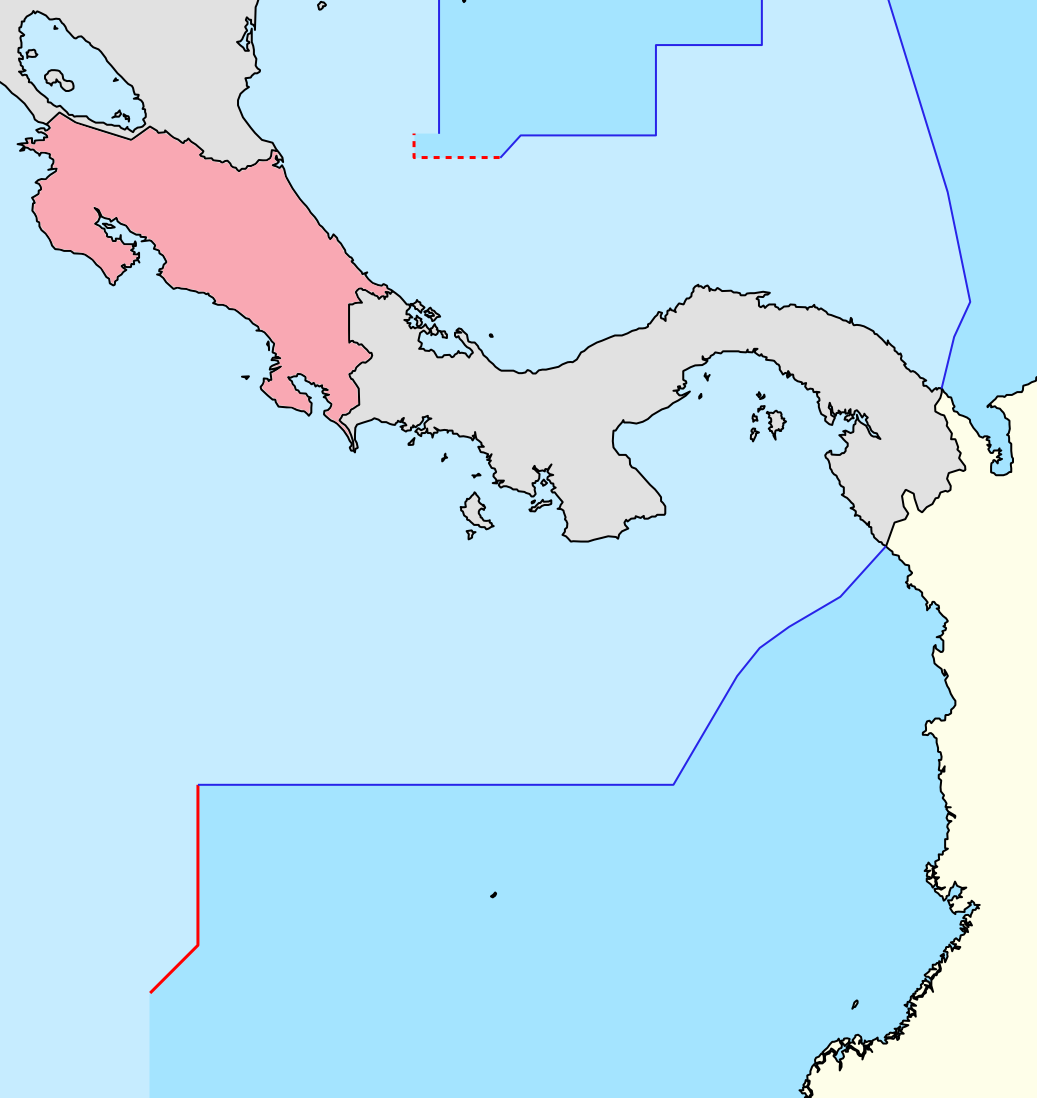
Border between Colombia and Costa Rica.

Colombia shares borders with Costa Rica in both the Pacific and the Caribbean. Both borders were delimited separately, with the Caribbean border not yet ratified by the Costa Rican Congress due to the problems that have arisen with the demarcation of the border between both countries and Nicaragua. The treaty that served this purpose is the Facio-Fernández Treaty, signed on 17 March 1977 between the Colombian ambassador in Costa Rica, Heraclio Fernández Sandoval, and the Costa Rican Minister of Foreign Affairs, Gonzalo Facio. The border consists of the following points:

- From the point of coordinates 11°00′00″N 81°15′00″W to the point 10°49′00″N 81°26′14″W, and from the previous point continue along the parallel until reaching the coordinates 10°49′00″N 82°14′00″W.

The delimitation of the marine and submarine spaces between both nations in the Pacific Ocean was made by means of the Gutiérrez-Lloreda Treaty, signed in Bogotá on 6 April 1984 between Carlos José Gutiérrez and Rodrigo Lloreda Caicedo, foreign ministers of Costa Rica and Colombia respectively. This treaty was important for Costa Rica, since it is the first international recognition of the marine and submarine areas that Costa Rica declares belong to it, taking Cocos Island as a base. The border is as follows:

- From the point of coordinates 05°00′00″N 84°19′00″W, here the border between Colombia and Panama ends, to the point 03°32′00″N 84°19′00″W, and from this last the border continues to the point 03°03′00″N 84°46′00″W.

=== Ecuador ===
The delimitation of the border with Ecuador was carried out by the Liévano-Lucio Treaty, signed on 23 August 1975. This agreement, signed by Indalecio Liévano Aguirre and Antonio José Lucio Paredes, foreign ministers of Colombia and Ecuador respectively, determined the border between the marine and submarine areas as follows:

- From the intersection of the extension of the land border and the confluence of the territorial areas of both countries, a midpoint is marked in Ancón de Sardinas Bay; from here, a straight line continues along the parallel generated by this until reaching the 200 nautical miles corresponding to each country.

=== Haiti ===
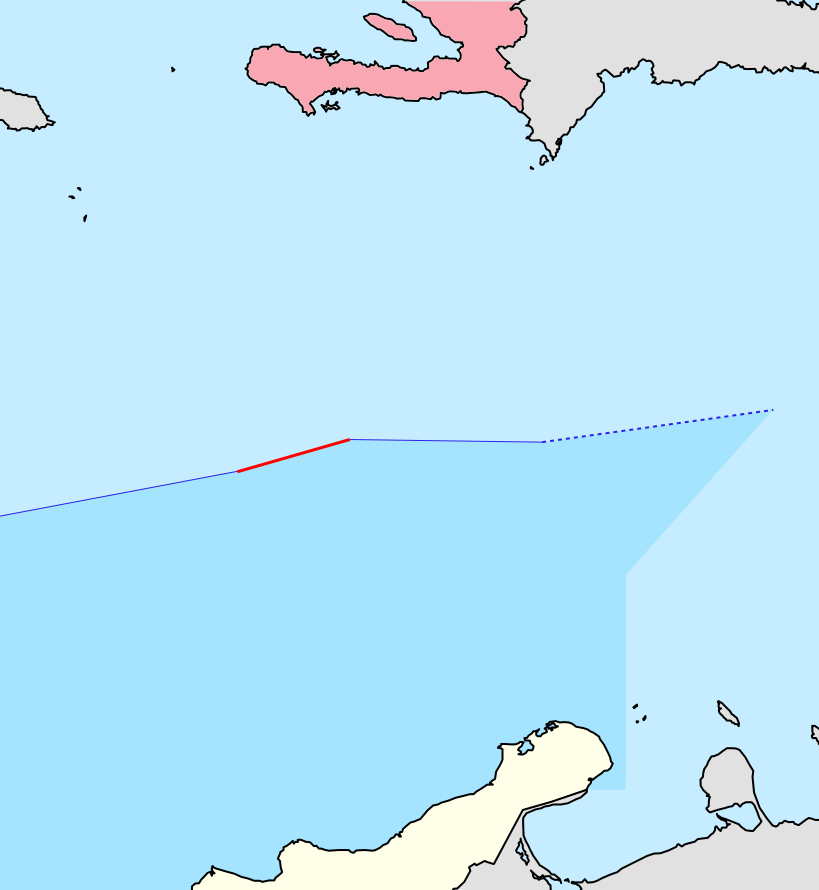
Border between Colombia and Haiti.

The demarcation of the border with Haiti was carried out through the Liévano-Brutus Treaty, signed on 17 February 1978 in Port-au-Prince by the minister of foreign affairs of Colombia, Indalecio Liévano Aguirre, and the secretary of state for foreign affairs and religion of Haiti, Edner Brutus. This treaty delimits the border between the two countries with a single straight line that runs between the coordinate points 14°44′10″N 74°30′50″W y 15°02′00″N 73°27′30″W.

=== Honduras ===
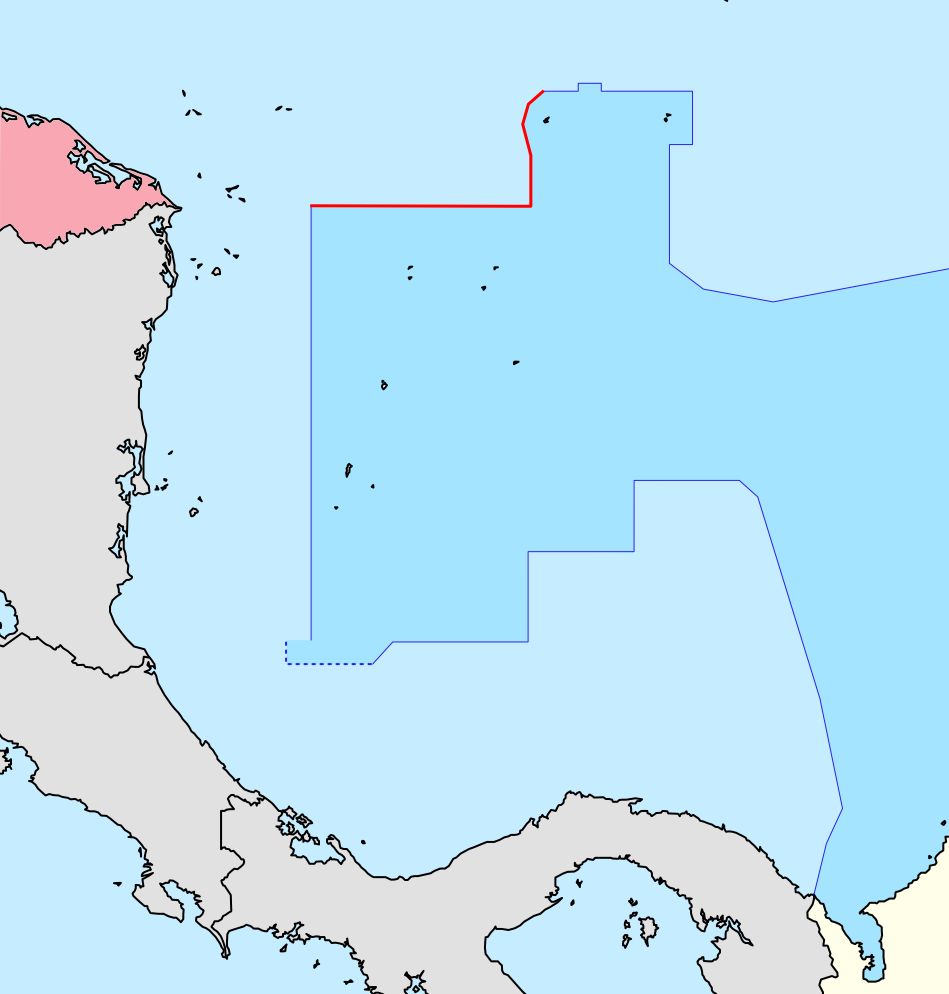
Border between Colombia and Honduras.

The Ramírez Ocampo-López Contreras Treaty, signed in San Andrés (Colombia) on 2 August 1986, delimited the marine and submarine areas of Colombia and Honduras from the point with coordinates 14°59′08″N 82°00′00″W to the point 16°04′15″N 79°50′32″W.

Following the ratification of the treaty by Honduras in 1999, Nicaragua sued the country in December of that year before the International Court of Justice in The Hague, considering that the Ramírez-López Treaty signed between Colombia and Honduras was detrimental to it. On 8 October 2007, the Court ruled on the maritime dispute between Honduras and Nicaragua, granting Honduras sovereignty over the Bobel, South, Savanna and Port Royal cays, and also establishing that the 15th parallel did not constitute the maritime border between Nicaragua and Honduras, since, given the inability of the International Court to define base points and construct an equidistant line that establishes the single maritime boundary, it proposed taking into account the "bisector method" from the coasts of each country, thus limiting the Honduran-Nicaraguan maritime border with waters under the sovereignty of Jamaica.

=== Jamaica ===
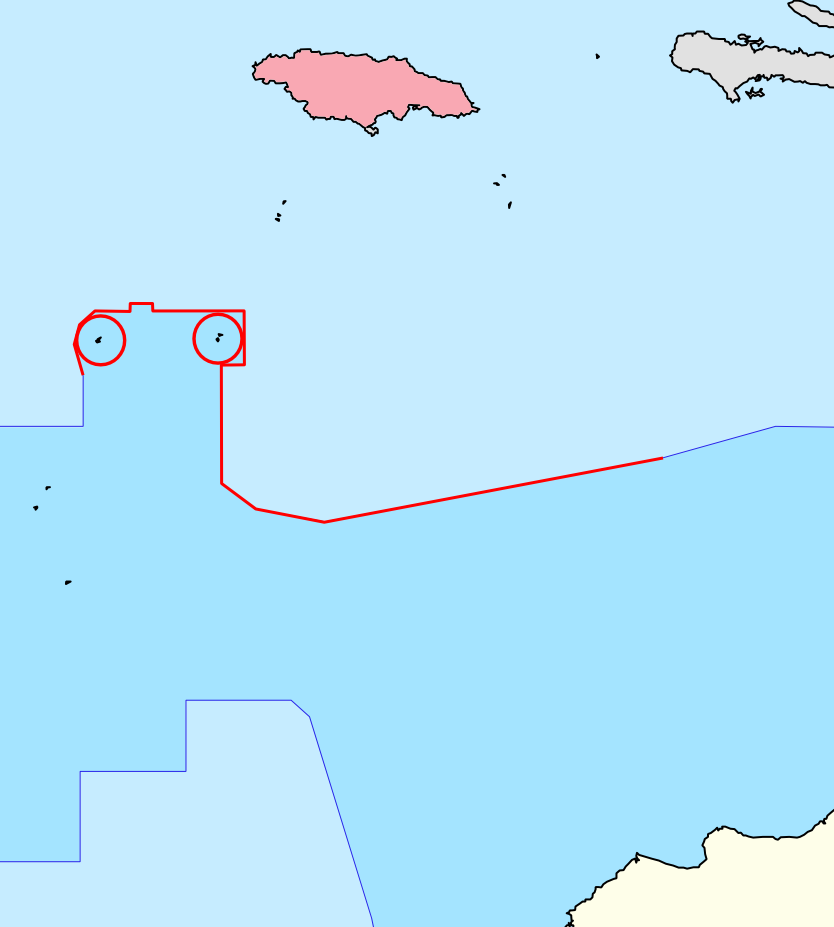
Border between Colombia and Jamaica.

The delimitation with Jamaica was carried out by means of the Sanín-Robertson Treaty, signed on 12 November 1993. The border consists of 2 sections, one that goes from where the marine limit with Honduras (16°04′15″N 79°50′32″W) to the point 14°29′37″N 78°38′00″W, and from this to the limit with Haiti (14°44′10″N 74°30′50″W). The first section outlines a zone of joint administration, control, exploration and exploitation of living resources, called the Common Regime Area.

=== Panama ===
The maritime borders with Panama in both oceans were delimited by the Liévano-Boyd Treaty signed on 20 November 1976 between Indalecio Liévano Aguirre and Aquilino Boyd, Ministers of Foreign Affairs of Colombia and Panama, respectively. The treaty delimits the part corresponding to the Caribbean Sea as follows:

- The median line on which all points are equidistant from the nearest points on the baselines, from which each nation measures the breadth of its territorial sea, from the point where the land boundary touches the sea at Cape Shark (08°41′7.3″N 77°21′50.9″W) to the point situated at 12°30′00″N 78°00′00″W.
- Starting from the point at 12°30′00″N 78°00′00″W, the delimitation of the marine and submarine areas belonging to each of the two nations consists of a series of straight lines, up to the point with coordinates 11°00′00″N 81°15′00″W, where the boundaries with Costa Rica begin.

The delimitation corresponding to the Pacific Ocean is:

- From the midpoint between Puntas Cocalito and Ardita, with 07°12′39.3″N 77°53′20.9″W, the point where the land border between the two nations ends, to the point located at coordinates 05°00′00″N 79°52′00″W. At this point the median line ends, in which all points are equidistant from the points closest to the baselines, from which each nation measures the width of its territorial sea.
- Starting from the point located at coordinates 05°00′00″N 79°52′00″W continue along its parallel to the point with coordinates 05°00′00″N 84°19′00″W, where the boundary with Costa Rica begins.

=== Dominican Republic ===
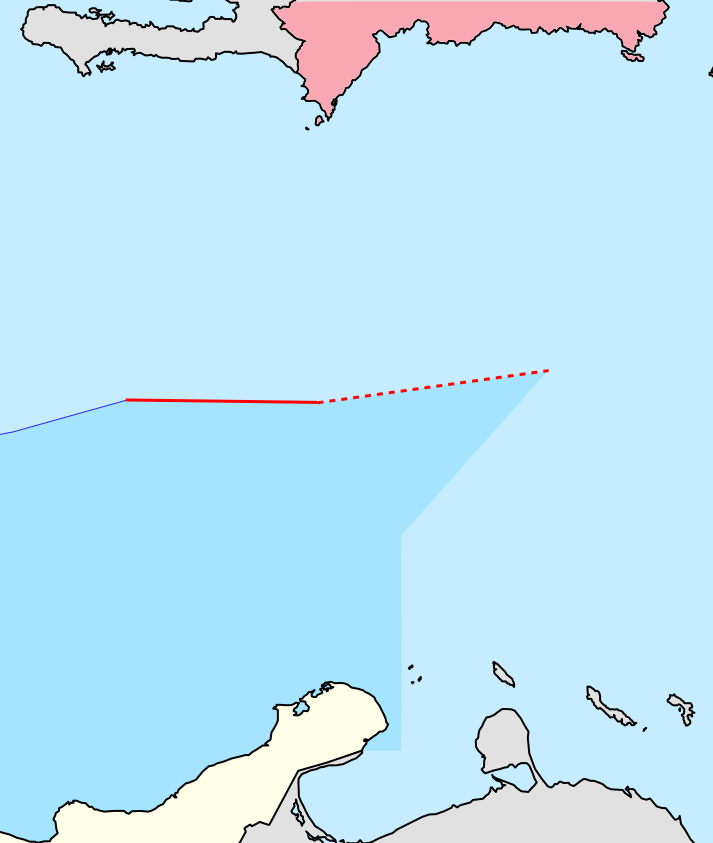
Border between Colombia and Dominican Republic.

This limit was determined by the Liévano-Jiménez Treaty, signed on 13 January 1978. This agreement also establishes the existence of a Common Scientific Research and Fisheries Exploitation Zone, in which each country has fishing rights and research rights related to the living resources of the area without prejudice to the sovereignty of both nations. The delimitation consists of two sections:

- From the point coordinates 15°02′00″N 73°27′30″W, where the border with Haiti ends, to the point 15°00′40″N 71°40′30″W. Both points frame the Common Fishing Area.
- From the previous point a straight line is drawn to the coordinates 15°18′00″N 69°29′30″W.

Due to the impossibility of an agreement on marine areas between Colombia and Venezuela, the last section is called "Projection" since the latter country, following in the footsteps of Colombia, signed a treaty on 3 March 1979, whose route overlaps the Colombian-Dominican border.

=== Dispute with Nicaragua ===
Delimitation between Colombia and Nicaragua according to the ruling of the International Court of Justice. The areas in question: Colombian Sea Colombia-Jamaica Common Regime Area Sea that was administered by Colombia, and that the Hague ruling assigned to Nicaragua Nicaraguan Sea

The delimitation with Nicaragua was carried out by means of the Esguerra-Bárcenas Treaty, which was signed on 24 March 1928. Through this, Colombia recognised the Mosquito Coast and adjacent islands as Nicaraguan property, while Nicaragua recognized Colombian sovereignty over the archipelago of San Andrés and Providencia, all of them ceded to the Viceroyalty of New Granada (predecessor of the current republics of Colombia, Ecuador and Panama) by means of the Royal Decree of 1803.

The problem with this agreement is that at the time it was signed, the so-called law of the sea did not yet exist, so Nicaragua declared the treaty null and void in the 1980s, alleging that it was a violation of its sovereignty and that at that time it was militarily occupied by the United States. It also began to claim the Roncador, Quitasueño and Serrana cays as its own, which in that year were in dispute between Colombia and the United States and were not included in the 1928 treaty.

Since Nicaragua declared the treaty null and void, both countries have had various diplomatic disputes over the matter. The most important of these was that the Nicaraguan government took the case to the International Court of Justice in The Hague on 6 December 2001. Colombia considered the annulment of the treaty to be a unilateral act and therefore a violation of international law, and filed its appeal before the Court.

The ICJ ruled on 13 December 2007, stating that while the Esguerra-Bárcenas Treaty did clarify Colombia's sovereignty over the San Andrés and Providencia archipelago, it did not do the same over the Roncador, Serrana and Quitasueño cays and did not resolve the boundary between the marine and submarine areas between the two countries.

On November 19, 2012, the International Court of Justice ratified that all the cays, Roncador, Quitasueño, Serrana, Serranilla, Bajo Nuevo, Albuquerque and Este Sudeste, in dispute with Nicaragua, belong to Colombia, however, it redefined the ownership of the territorial sea between both countries, granting 40% of Colombia's maritime possessions to Nicaragua.

== See also ==
- Geography of Colombia
- Extreme points of Colombia
- Borders of Brazil
- Borders of Venezuela
