= Cravo =

Cravo is a given name and a surname. Notable people with the name include:

- Christian Cravo (born 1974), Brazilian photographer
- J. Cravo (José Craveirinha) (1922–2003), Mozambican journalist, story writer and poet
- João Cravo (1929–2022), Portuguese rower
- Mário Cravo Neto (1947–2009), Brazilian photographer, sculptor and draughtsman

== See also ==
- Cravo Norte, town and municipality in the Arauca Department, Colombia
- Cravo Norte River, river of Colombia
- Cravo Sur River, river of Colombia
- Carvao (disambiguation)
- Craveiro
- Cravero
