= OPON =

OPON or Opon can refer to:

- The old name of Lapu-Lapu City, Philippines
- Special Purpose Police Unit (Azerbaijan) (OPON), special forces detachment in Azerbaijan
- The Opon River
- The extinct Opón language

== See also ==
- OMON
