= Cravo River =

Cravo River may refer to:

- Cravo Norte River
- Cravo Sur River
