= Güiza =

Güiza may refer to:

- Dani Güiza, a Spanish professional footballer who plays for CD Rota
- Güiza River, a river in Colombia draining into the Pacific Ocean
