= Casanare =

Casanare may refer to:

- Casanare Department, an administrative division in Colombia
- Casanare Province, a province of the Viceroyalty of New Granada
- Casanare River, a tributary of the Meta River in Colombia
- Casanare, Colombia, a settlement in Colombia on the Casanare River
