= Ariporo River =

Coordinates: 6°03′12″N 69°53′56″W

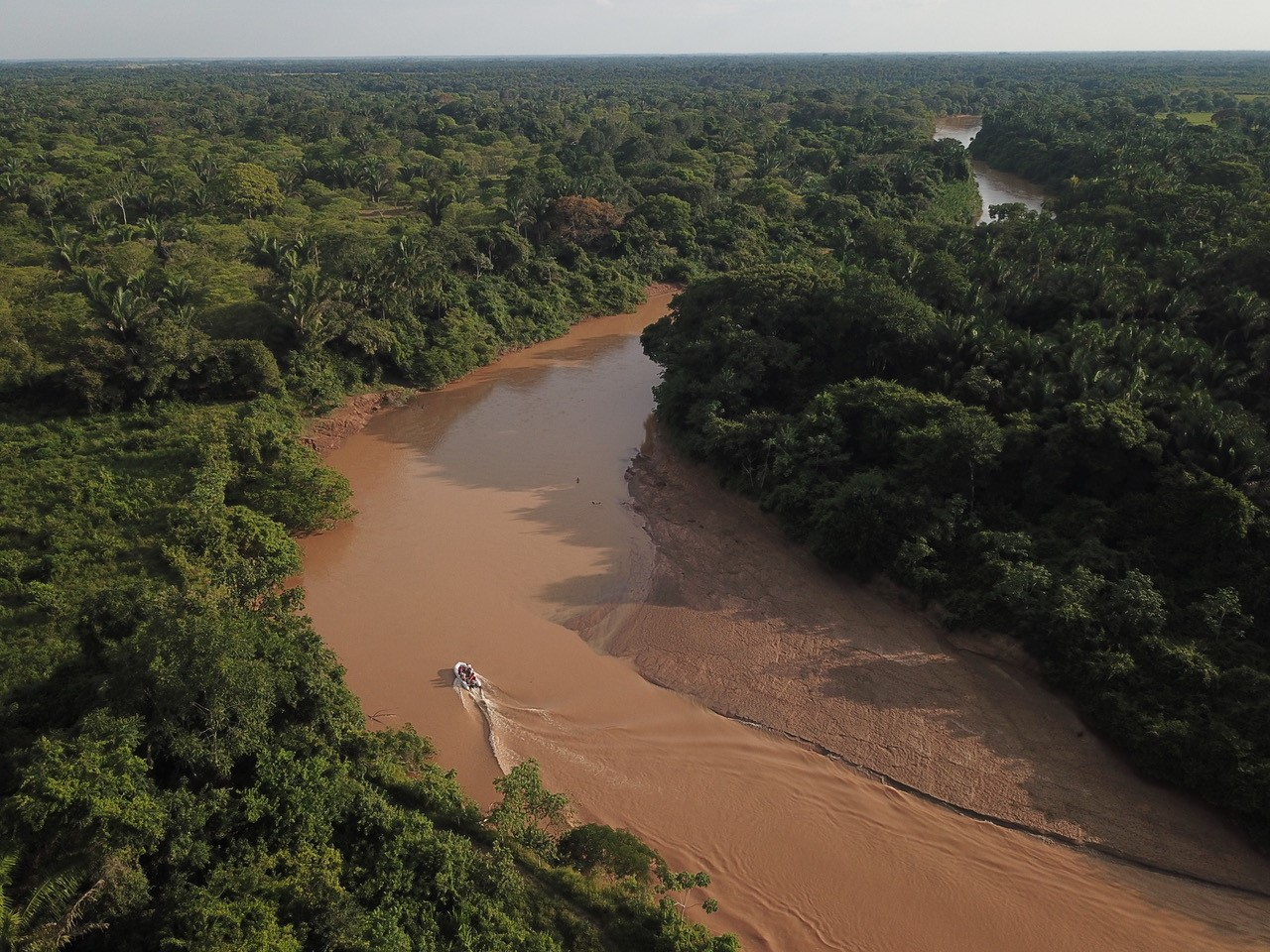
- Bird's-eye view of the Ariporo River

- Location of mouth

Location
- Country: Colombia
- Department: Casanare

Physical characteristics
- Length: 1,300 kilometres (810 mi)

The Ariporo River is a river in the eastern Casanare Department of Colombia. It is part of the Orinoco River basin.

== Wildlife ==
The Ariporo River is inhabited by the Malacoglanis gelatinosus, a species of catfish.

== Geography ==
The Ariporo River originates on the eastern slopes of the Cordillera Oriental, in the westernmost part of the Casanare Department. It then flows eastward before joining the Casanare River in the department’s easternmost region, a few kilometers upstream from the Casanare's confluence with the Meta River.

== Climate ==
The average annual temperature in the region is 25 °C. The warmest month is March, with an average temperature of 28 °C, while the coldest is July, averaging 22 °C.

The average annual precipitation is 2,959 millimeters. The wettest month is June, with an average of 467 mm of rainfall, and the driest is January, with just 2 mm.

== See also ==
- List of rivers of Colombia
