= Telembí River =

Location
- Country: Colombia

Physical characteristics
- Mouth: Patía River
  - coordinates: 1°49′53″N 78°15′55″W

The Telembí River is a river of Colombia. It drains into the Pacific Ocean via the Patía River.

== See also ==
- List of rivers of Colombia
