= Losada River =

Location
- Country: Colombia

Physical characteristics
- Mouth: Guayabero River
  - coordinates: 2°12′21″N 73°51′18″W

Losada River (Spanish pronunciation: [loˈsaða]) is a river of Colombia. It is part of the Orinoco River basin.

== See also ==
- List of rivers of Colombia
