= Nare River =

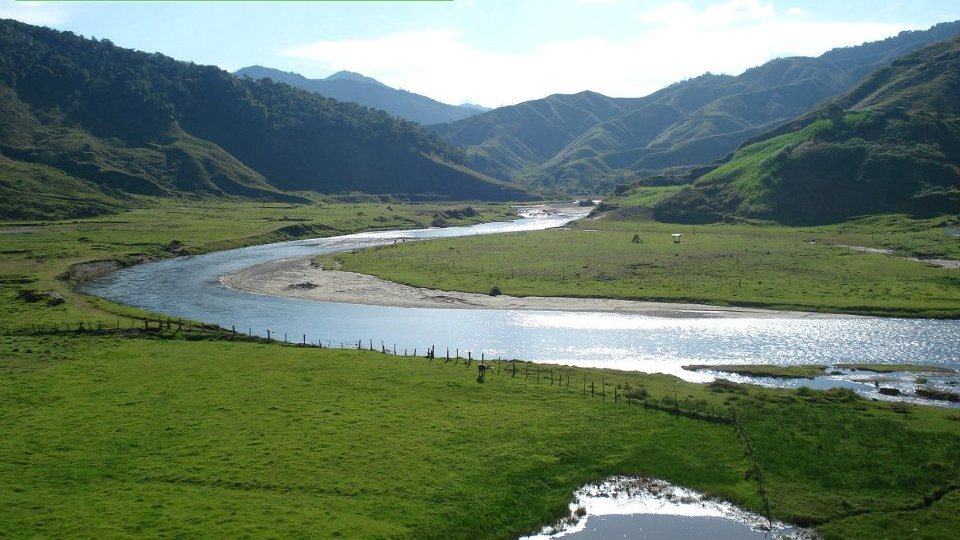

Location
- Country: Colombia

Physical characteristics
- Mouth
  - location: Caribbean Sea

Nare River is a river of the Antioquia department of Colombia. It begins near the town of El Retiro as a creek called Rio Negro (black river), meandering through the small cities of Rionegro and Marinilla, before emptying into the Peñol-Guatapé Reservoir. Once it leaves the dam, it is known as the Nare River and travels east where it empties into the Magdalena River, Colombia's largest, which flows into the Caribbean Sea at the city of Barranquilla.

== See also ==
- List of rivers of Colombia
