= Aquio River =

Coordinates: 2°42′08″N 67°34′02″W

Location
- Country: Colombia

Aquio River is a river of Colombia. It is part of the Amazon River basin.

== See also ==
- List of rivers of Colombia
