= Papunáua River =

Location
- Country: Colombia

Physical characteristics
- Source
  - location: Vaupés Department

Papunáua River (Spanish pronunciation: [papuˈnawa]) is a river of Colombia. It is part of the Orinoco River basin. This is listed in the List of rivers in Vaupés Department

== See also ==
- List of rivers of Colombia
