= Craveiro =

Craveiro is a Portuguese surname and the name of a plant (Dianthus caryophyllus).

== Notable people ==
Notable people with this surname include:

- Francisco Craveiro Lopes (1894–1964), Portuguese politician
- Nuno Craveiro Lopes (1921–1972), Portuguese architect
- Paulo Fernando Craveiro (born 1934), Brazilian writer
