= Metica River =

Location
- Country: Colombia

Metica River is a river of Colombia. It is part of the Orinoco River basin.

== See also ==
- List of rivers of Colombia
