= Bojayá River =

Location
- Country: Colombia

The Bojayá River is a river of Colombia. It drains into the Caribbean Sea via the Atrato River.

== See also ==
- List of rivers of Colombia
