= Saldaña River =

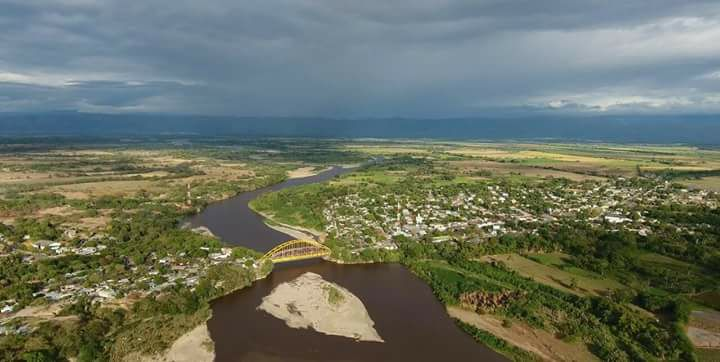

Location
- Country: Colombia

The Saldaña River is a river of Colombia. It drains into the Caribbean Sea via the Magdalena River.

== See also ==
- List of rivers of Colombia
