= Manacacías River =

Coordinates: 4.5581°N 72.0681°W

Location
- Country: Colombia

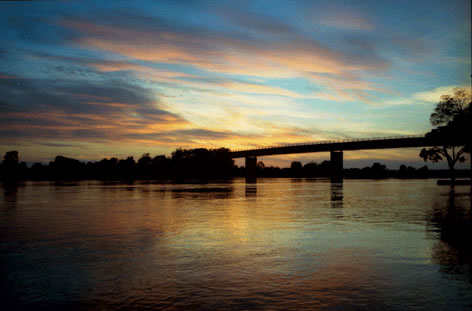
Manacacias River photo

Manacacías River is a river of Colombia. It is part of the Orinoco River basin.

== See also ==
- List of rivers of Colombia
