= Ceibas River =

Location
- Country: Colombia

The Ceibas River (Spanish pronunciation: [ˈsejβas]) is a river of Colombia. It drains into the Caribbean Sea via the Magdalena River.

== See also ==
- List of rivers of Colombia
