= Güiza River =

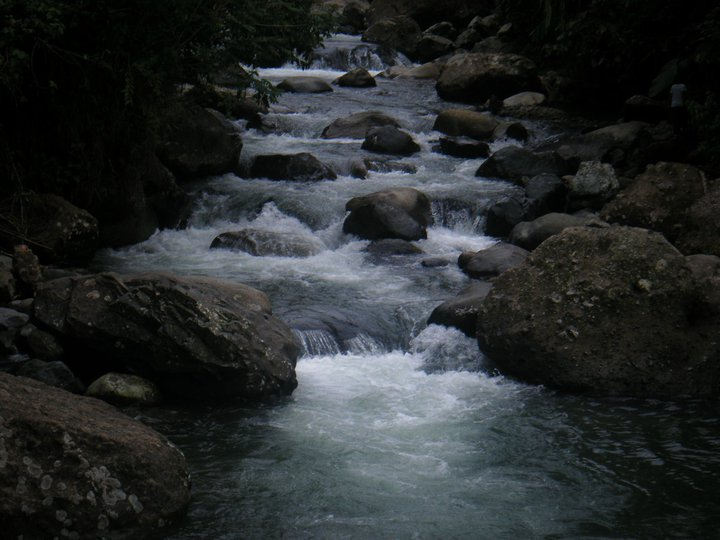

Location
- Country: Colombia

The Güiza River is a river of Colombia. It drains into the Pacific Ocean via the Mira River.

== See also ==
- List of rivers of Colombia
