= Cusiana River =

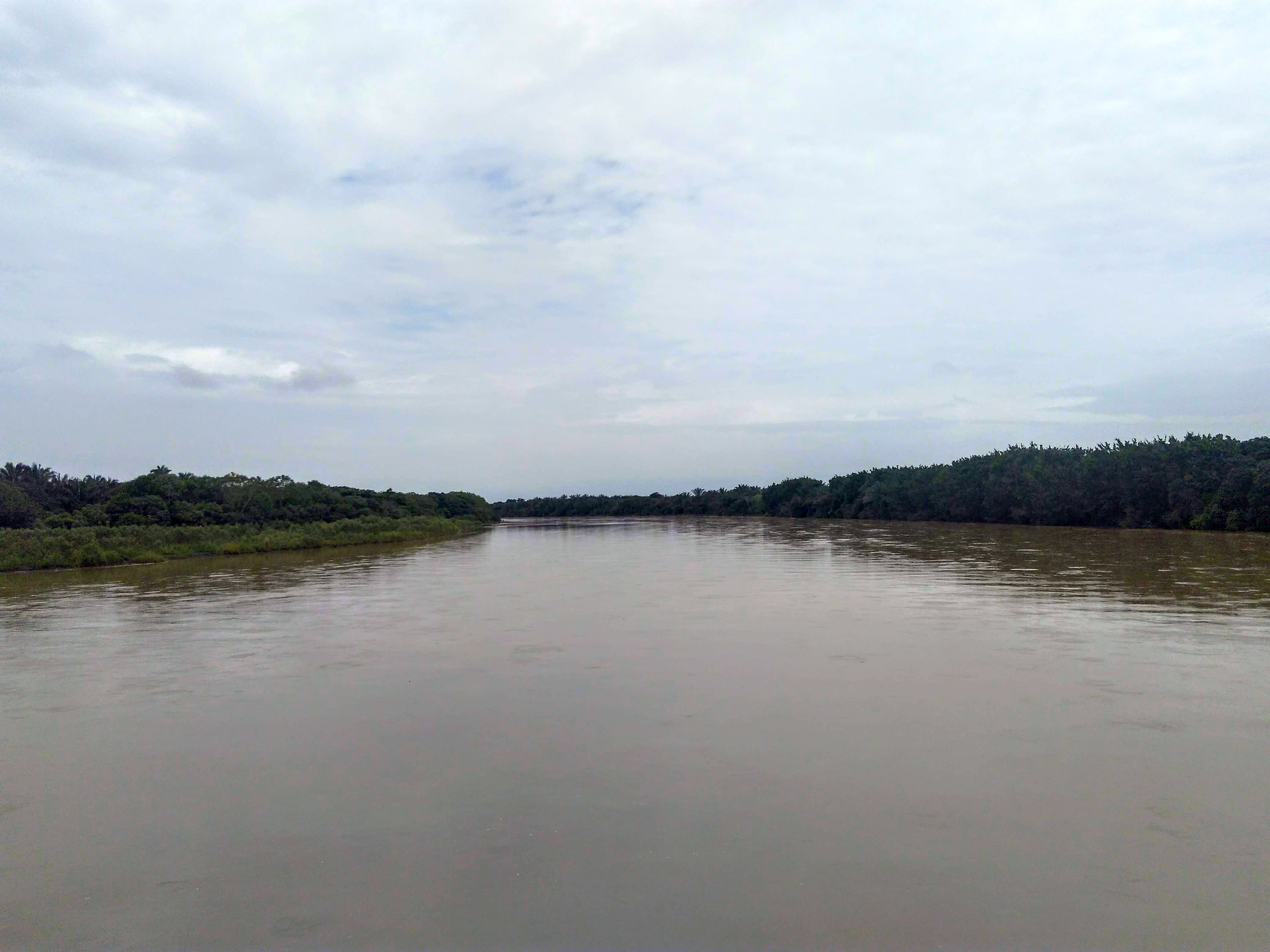

Location
- Country: Colombia

Cusiana River (Spanish pronunciation: [kusiˈana]) is a river of Colombia. It is part of the Orinoco River basin.

== See also ==
- List of rivers of Colombia
