= Río Negro (Magdalena River tributary) =

Coordinates: 2°38′N 75°25′W

Rio Negro
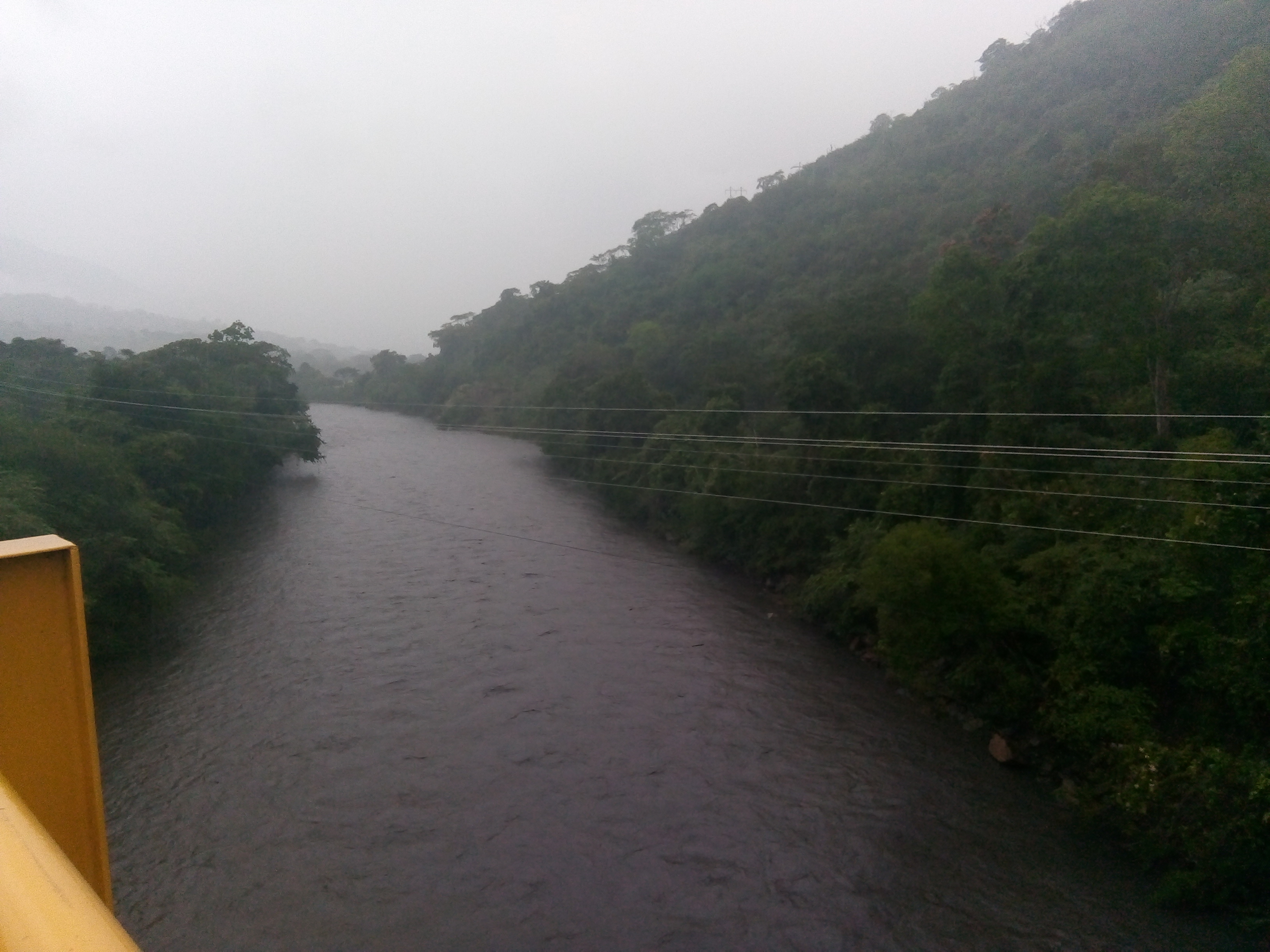

Location
- Country: Colombia

Physical characteristics
- Mouth
  - location: Magdalena River

The Rio Negro (Spanish pronunciation: [ˈri.o ˈneɣɾo]) is a river of Colombia. It is a tributary of the Magdalena River which drains into the Caribbean Sea.

== See also ==
- List of rivers of Colombia
