= Cravo Norte River =

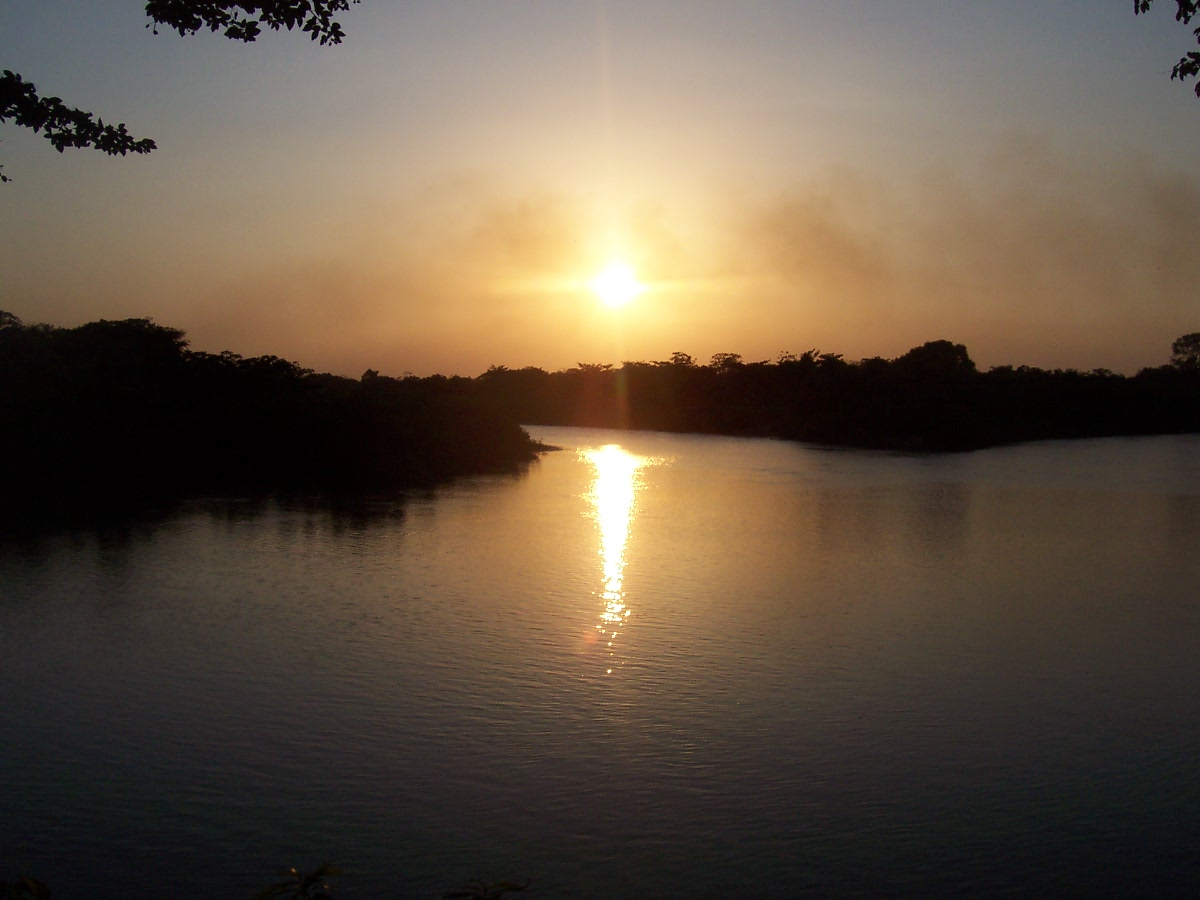

Location
- Country: Colombia

Physical characteristics
- Mouth: Casanare River
  - location: Cravo Norte
  - coordinates: 6°17′43″N 70°11′56″W

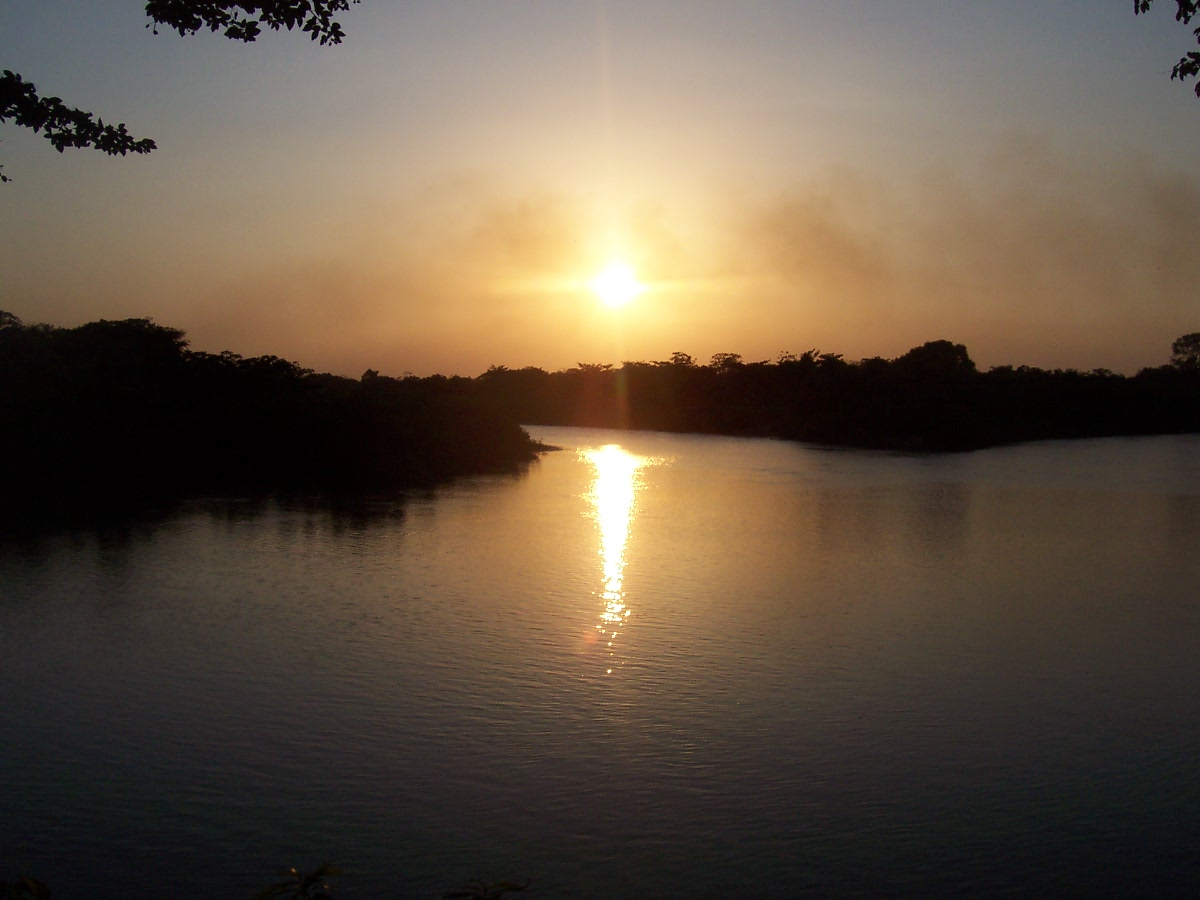

Cravo Norte River is a river of Colombia. It is part of the Orinoco River basin.

== See also ==
- List of rivers of Colombia
