= Leon River (Colombia) =

Location
- Country: Colombia - Urabá Antioquia

The Leon River is a river of Urabá Antioquia, Colombia. It drains into the Caribbean Sea.

== See also ==
- List of rivers of Colombia
