= Opón-Carare language =

Extinct Cariban language of Colombia

Opón-Carare
- Opón, Opón-Karare, Opone
- Native to: Colombia
- Region: Opon River, Santander Department
- Ethnicity: Opón, Carare
- Extinct: late 20th century
- Language family: Cariban: Opón–Yukpa; Opón-Carare
- Dialects: Opón; Carare

Language codes
- ISO 639-3: None (mis)
- Glottolog: opon1234
- Linguasphere: 80-ABA-a

- Opon-Carare is classified as Extinct by the UNESCO Atlas of the World's Languages in Danger.

Opón-Carare (Opone) is an extinct, unusually divergent Cariban language of Colombia. It is most closely related to Yukpa. It is known only from two wordlists, published in 1878 and 1958 respectively. The language was reported to be likely extinct by 1973.

== Phonology ==
=== Giraldo and Fornaguera (1958) ===
Marshall Durbin and Haydée Seijas derive the following phonology for Opón-Carare based on data published in 1958 from Giraldo and Fornaguera.

Consonants
		Bilabial	Alveolar	Postalveolar	Palatal	Velar	Glottal
Plosive	voiceless	p	t			k	(ʔ)^{1}
Plosive	voiced	b	d			g	
Fricative			s	ʃ			h
Trill			r				
Nasal		m	n		ɲ		
Approximant		w			j		

1. [ʔ] may not be phonemic, it appears only at morpheme boundaries.

Vowels
	Front		Central		Back	
	short	long	short	long	short	long
Close	i	iː			u	uː
Mid	e	eː	ə		o	oː
Open			a	aː		

While common in other Cariban languages, nasal vowels are not recorded in Opón-Carare.

=== Lengerke (1878) ===
The following phonology is derived from the data in Lengerke (1878).

Consonant phonemes of Opón
		Bilabial	Alveolar	Postalveolar	Palatal	Velar	Glottal
Plosive	voiceless	p	t			k	
Plosive	voiced	b					
Fricative			s	(ʃ)			h
Affricate				tʃ			
Trill			r				
Nasal		m	n				
Approximant		w			j		

The phonology is the same in Carare, with the exception that /tʃ/ and /w/ are not present, and /ʃ/ interpreted for the sequence ⟨sy⟩.

Vowels
	Front	Central	Back
Close	i		u
Mid	e	(ə)	o
Open		a	
