= Sardinata River =

Coordinates: 9.0615°N 72.4634°W

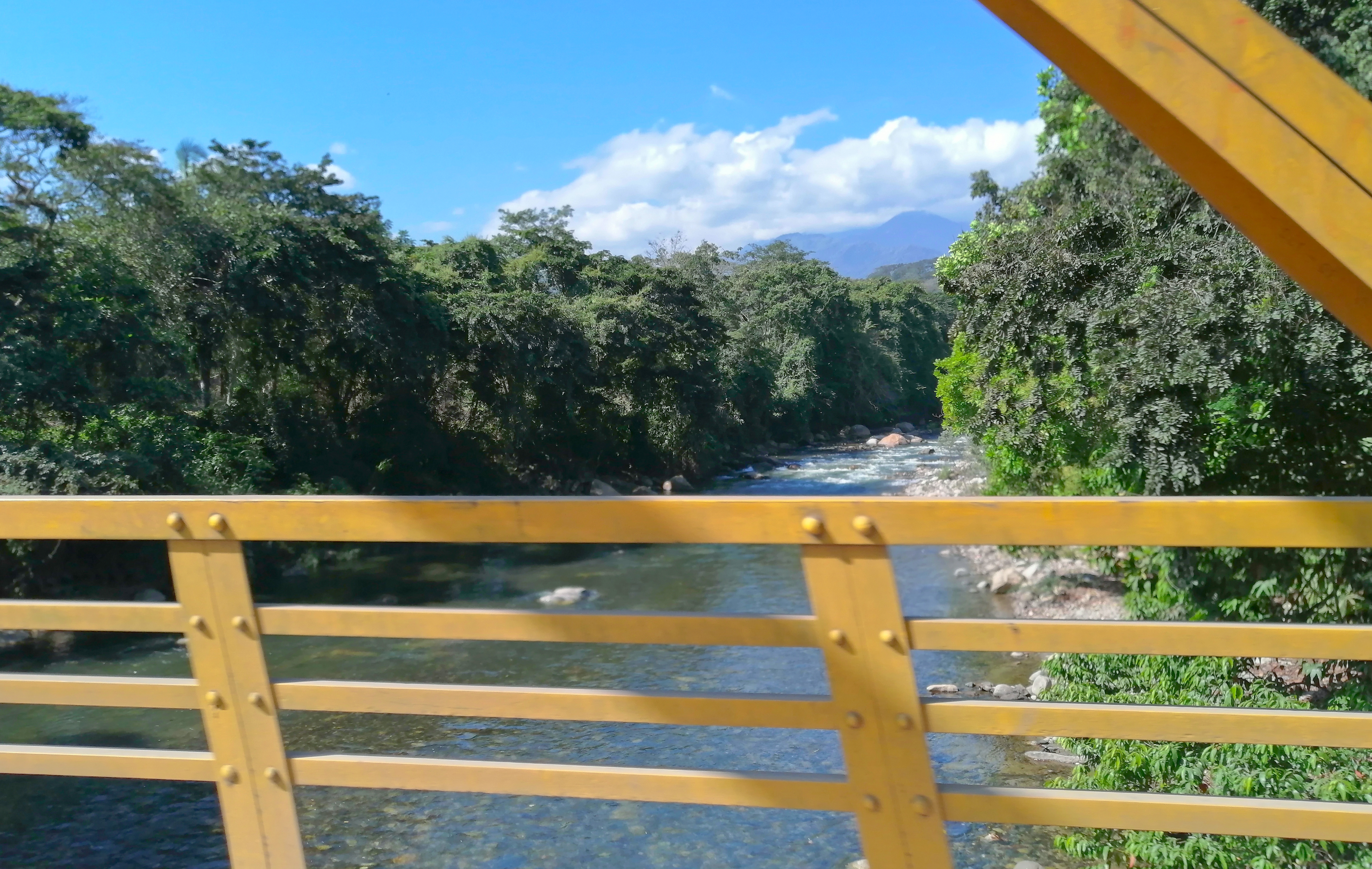

Location
- Country: Colombia

The Sardinata River (Spanish pronunciation: [saɾðiˈnata]) is a river of Colombia. It drains into Lake Maracaibo via the Catatumbo River.

== See also ==
- List of rivers of Colombia
