= Paulo Fernando Craveiro =

Brazilian writer

Paulo Fernando Craveiro GCIH
- Born: Paulo Fernando Craveiro Leite; August 11, 1934 (age 91); Monteiro, Paraíba, Brazil
- Occupations: writer, journalist, columnist and art critic
- Parent(s): Alfredo Craveiro Costa Leite; Maria José Niceas Leite
- Website: paulocraveiro.com

Signature
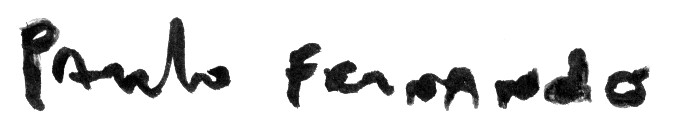

Paulo Fernando Craveiro GCIH (born August 11, 1934, in Paraíba, Brazil) is a writer, journalist, columnist and art critic.

== Biography ==
Son of Alfredo Craveiro Costa Leite (lawyer, prosecutor, poet and journalist) and Maria José Niceas Leite, Paulo Fernando Craveiro was born on August 11, 1934, at the Alagoa do Monteiro, today the city of Monteiro, Paraíba. His grandparent were Francisco Assis Leite and Adélia Craveiro Costa Leite. When he was three months old, he came with his family to live in Recife, Pernambuco. He studied at the Faculdade de Direito do Recife. He studied literary style of the Facultad de Filosofía, Universidad de Madrid, won the Carlos Septien Journalism Prize, created by the Instituto de Cultura Hispânica de Madri, attended classes in political theory at George Washington University and perfected in journalism at the Thomson Foundation in Wales. For many years he wrote for newspapers.

== Career ==
He began his professional career as a radio announcer and for journalistic career in television was host of "Um Homem Chamado Notícia" (A Man Called News) in which news of the day and had always ended the broadcast with the famous phrase "head over heels, no one is made of iron".

Followed by a brief instant political career when he was Chief of Staff of the State of Pernambuco, in the era of Governor Nilo Coelho (1967–1971). On this occasion, had the opportunity to receive and cicerone the visit of Queen Elizabeth II, along with Prince Philip, Duke of Edinburgh.

As a journalist he traveled the world several times, and then described his vision through chronicles and newspaper articles on various corners of the world.

== Works ==
Cover	Title	Year	Category
	O Homem Só	1959	Chronicle
	Prefácio da Cidade	1961	Chronicle
	A Mulher no Silêncio	1964	Chronicle
	A Voz Escrita	1968	Poetry
	A Fábula da Guerra	1970	Chronicle
	O Pintor de Fêmeas	1976 and 1977	Poetry
	As Sandálias do Tempo	1978	Chronicle
	Prefácio da Cidade	1991	Chronicle
	Os Olhos Azuis da Sombra	2004	Novel
	O Último Dia do Corpo	2005	Novel
	Pássaro Feito de Pó	2007	Chronicle
	Boa Terra de Ódios	2007	Novel
	O Boneco Íntimo	2009	Novel

== Sites ==
- O Boneco Íntimo blog
- Paulo Fernando Craveiro's official website
