= Tomo River =

- Location within Colombia

Location
- Country: Colombia

Physical characteristics
- Mouth
  - coordinates: 5.3453°N 67.8186°W
- Length: 650 km (400 mi)
- Basin size: 20,301 km^{2} (7,838 mi^{2})
- Discharge
  - average: 991 m^{3}/s (35,000 cu ft/s)

Tomo River is a river of Colombia. It is part of the Orinoco River basin.

== See also ==
- List of rivers of Colombia
