= San Jorge River =

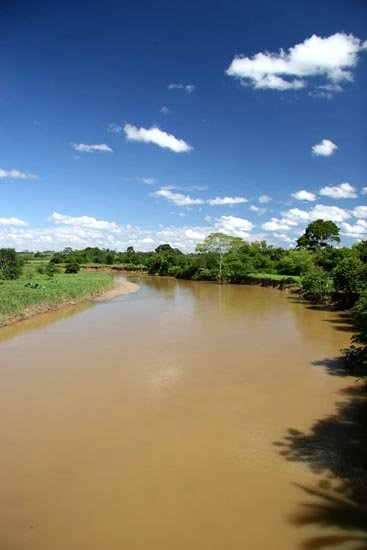
- San Jorge River in Montelíbano, Córdoba

Location
- Country: Colombia

Physical characteristics
- Source
  - location: Paramillo National Park
- Mouth
  - location: Magdalena River
- Length: 368 km (229 mi)
- Basin size: 96,500 km^{2} (37,300 sq mi)
- Discharge
  - average: 380 m^{3}/s (13,000 cu ft/s)

The San Jorge River is a river in Colombia that begins in National Park Paramillo (departments of Antioquia and Córdoba) and that runs between the mountains of San Geronimo and Ayapel before flowing into the River Cauca in Sucre Department.

The drainage basin comprises 96,500 square kilometres (37,300 mi^{2}) in the southeast of Córdoba Department, including the waters of Ayapel swamp and the Mompox region via the Caribbean departments of Cordoba, Sucre and Bolivar. Its tributaries are the rivers San Pedro, Dirty and Ure. The river registers a minimum flow of 24 cubic metres per second (850 cu ft/s) and a maximum of 697 cubic metres per second (24,600 cu ft/s).

Currently the San Jorge is one of the rivers with fish wealth, but its high pollution and deterioration was due largely to fishing with explosives and obtaining gold alluvium of its waters by the method of flotation mercury.

== History ==
The San Jorge was found by the Spanish conquistador Alonso de Heredia, while seeking to establish contact with the indigenous Zenú culture in the 1530s. At that time the river was known under the name of Xegú or Jegu and its banks flourished numerous villages of pre-Columbian society as Yape Zenú (now Ayapel, Córdoba) and Tacasuán (now San Benito Abad). Heredia gave the name of St. George in honor of the Christian saint who fought a dragon.

In 1966 an American aviator sighted an extensive network of canals and artificial ridges along the San Jorge, finding that the "raking" was not natural but a work of human engineering. In 1986, the Colombian archaeologists Clemencia Plazas and Anna Maria Falchetti, defending this thesis, showed that the ridges and channels built on the banks of San Jorge (covering about 50,000 square kilometres (19,000 mi^{2}) and are the largest of the river networks of Hispanic America) were the work of the pre-Columbian Zenú society, and that the San Jorge Valley was inhabited by a highly technological society can be seen as pottery and jewelry found on the banks of the river. Consisting of an extensive network of canals, hydraulic Prehispanic San Jorge River covers an area of 20,000 square kilometres (7,700 mi^{2}) and was built by an ethnic group that inhabited the area between the first and fourth centuries as the limited data on the subject. As this is an area that remains flooded for several months a year, it was necessary to create a drainage system to allow the permanent establishment of the population there.

== See also ==
- List of rivers of Colombia
