= Taraíra River =

Taraira River or Traíra River

Location
- Country: Colombia – Brazil

Physical characteristics
- Mouth: Apaporis River
  - coordinates: 1°04′08″S 69°25′59″W
- Length: 160 km (99 mi)

Basin features
- Progression: Apaporis River → Japurá River or Caquetá River → Amazon River

The Taraira River (Traíra) is a river forms part of the boundary of Colombia and Brazil. It is part of the Amazon River basin.

== Course ==
The Taraira River or Traíra River is a tributary of the Apaporis River, the Apaporis is a tributary of the Japurá River or Caquetá River in South America. (The Japurá is a tributary of the Amazon River). The entirety of the Taraira River forms part of the international boundary that separates Amazonas state in Brazil from Vaupés Department in Colombia. It flows into the Apaporis River on the border (Brazil - Colombia)), where it discharges its waters, near (about 40 km (25 mi) following the course of the Apaporis) to Vila Bittencourt, a Brazilian settlement.

There, in front of that Brazilian settlement Vila Bittencourt, the Apaporis River discharges its waters into the Japurá River or Caquetá River.

== West bank of the river ==
On the west bank of the Taraira or Traíra river is located the municipality Taraira (Vaupés), which contains in its area the Taraira Airport and the Taraira Lagoon.

=== Taraira Lagoon ===
The Taraira lagoon is a body of water in Colombia located at the southeast end of the department of Vaupés, which is located in limits with Brazil. It is located in the area of the municipality Taraira (Vaupés), near the rivers Apaporis and Taraira, and the lagoon covers 10 km^{2} (3.9 sq mi). Taraira Lagoon, also known as Lake Caparú or Mosiro Itájura, is an old meander of the Apaporis River.

== East bank of the river ==
To the east of the river is located an area corresponding to the Brazilian municipality of Japurá.

== See also ==
- List of rivers of Colombia
