= Carvao =

Carvao may refer to:

- Wajxaklajun, the ruins of a Maya civilization in Guatemala
- Carvão, a village in Amapá, Brazil
