= Querary River =

Coordinates: 1.0736°N 69.845°W

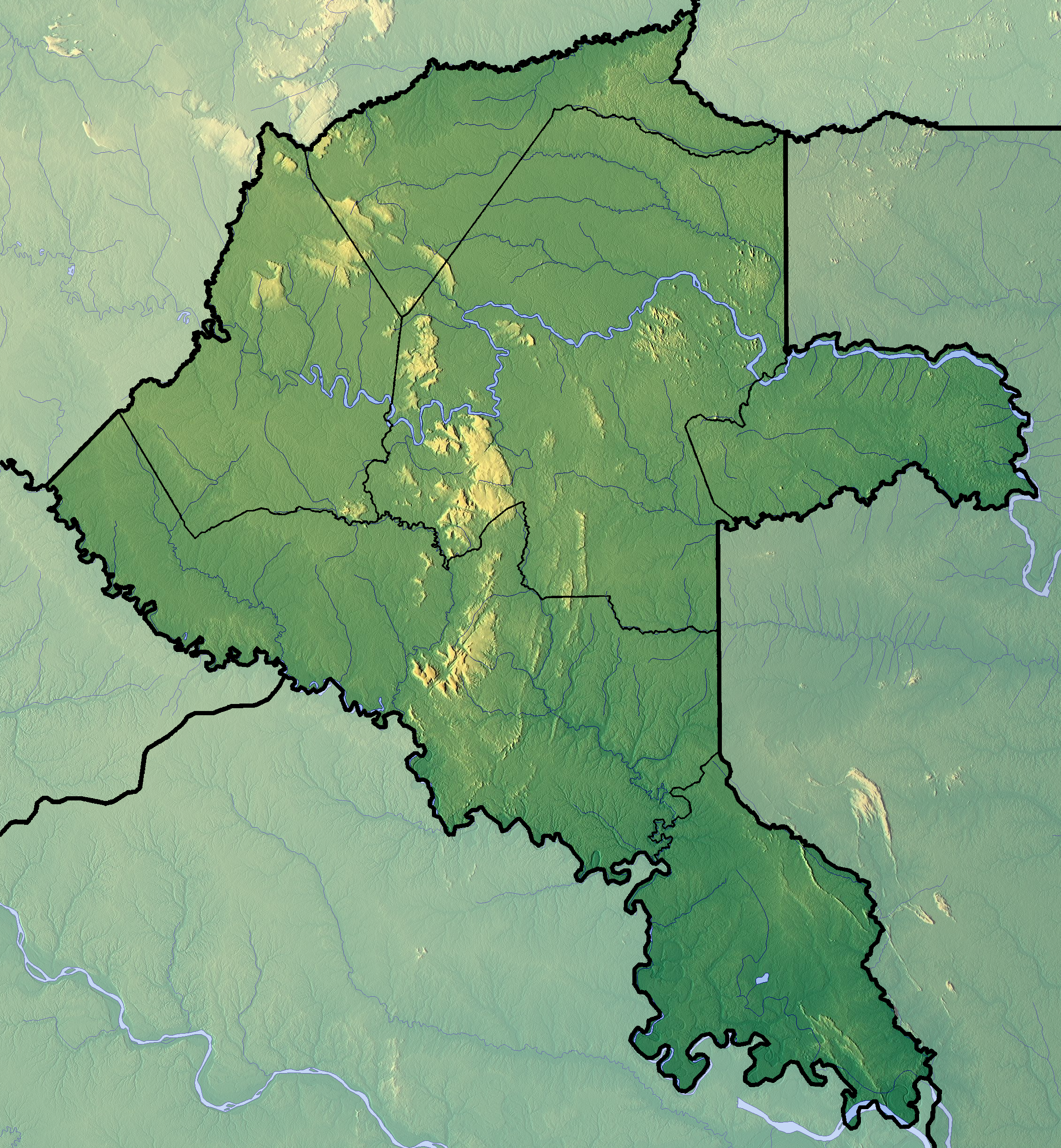

Location
- Country: Colombia

Physical characteristics
- Source
  - location: Vaupés Department

Querary River is a river of Colombia. It is part of the Amazon River basin and is a tributary of the Vaupés River.

== See also ==
- List of rivers of Colombia
