= Cravo Sur River =

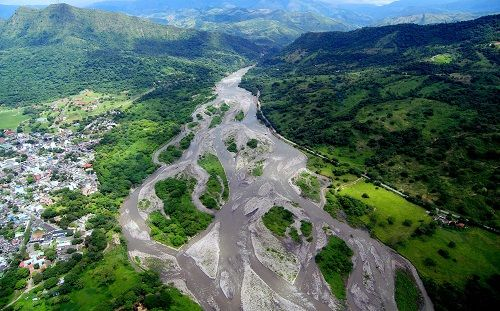
- Aerial view of the Cravo Sur River

Location
- Country: Colombia

Cravo Sur River is a river of Colombia. It is part of the Orinoco River basin.

== See also ==
- List of rivers of Colombia
