= Opon River =

Location
- Country: Colombia

Physical characteristics
- Mouth
  - location: Magdalena River

Opon River is a river of northern Colombia. It flows into the Magdalena River.

The name comes from the local indigenous language, presumably Opón.

== See also ==
- List of rivers of Colombia
- Opón language
