= Patía River =

River in Colombia

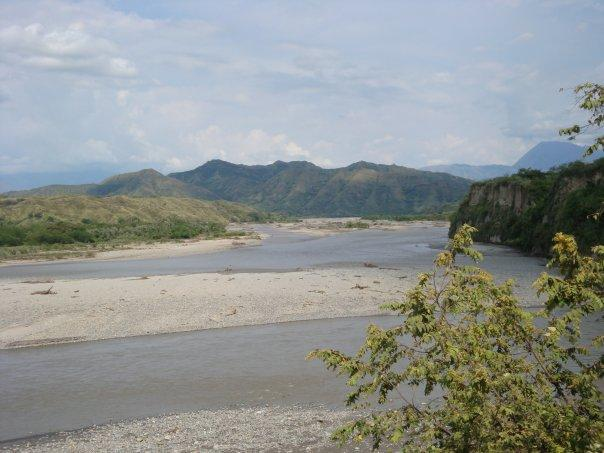

- Rivers in Colombia. Patía is in the far southwest

- Location of mouth

Location
- Country: Colombia

Physical characteristics
- Source
  - location: Cordillera Occidental
- Mouth
  - location: Pacific Ocean
  - coordinates: 2°15′36″N 78°40′47″W
  - elevation: 0 m (0 ft)
- Length: 400 km (250 mi)
- Basin size: 24,000 km^{2} (9,300 sq mi)
- Discharge
  - average: 1,453 m^{3}/s (51,300 cu ft/s)

The Patía River (Spanish: Río Patía) is a river in southwestern Colombia. It flows over 400 kilometres (250 mi) to drain into the Pacific Ocean north of Tumaco. The Patía River is the longest river on the Colombian Pacific Coast. The last 90 kilometres (56 mi) is navigable by boat.

== Geography ==
The Patía River begins in the Department of Cauca south of the city of Popayán near the town of Timbío. The source of the river begins in the gap between the West Andes and Central Andes very near the source of the Cauca River.

The Patía river flows westward from the Central massif of Colombia, cuts through the Western Cordillera and drains into the Pacific Ocean. In its upper section it runs through cloud forests and montane forests. The central section of the river flows through the Patía Valley dry forests ecoregion. The lower section to the west of the Western Cordillera flows through the Chocó jungles of the Pacific region. The Patía is fed by the Quilcacé, Guachicono, Mayo, Juanambú, Pasto and Guaitara rivers.

An 1853 watercolor by Manuel María Paz shows a mestizo or indigenous family on horseback herding cattle in a field near the Patía River.

== See also ==
- List of rivers of Colombia
- Pacific Region, Colombia
