= Fundación River =

River in Colombia

Coordinates: 10.4818°N 73.9673°W

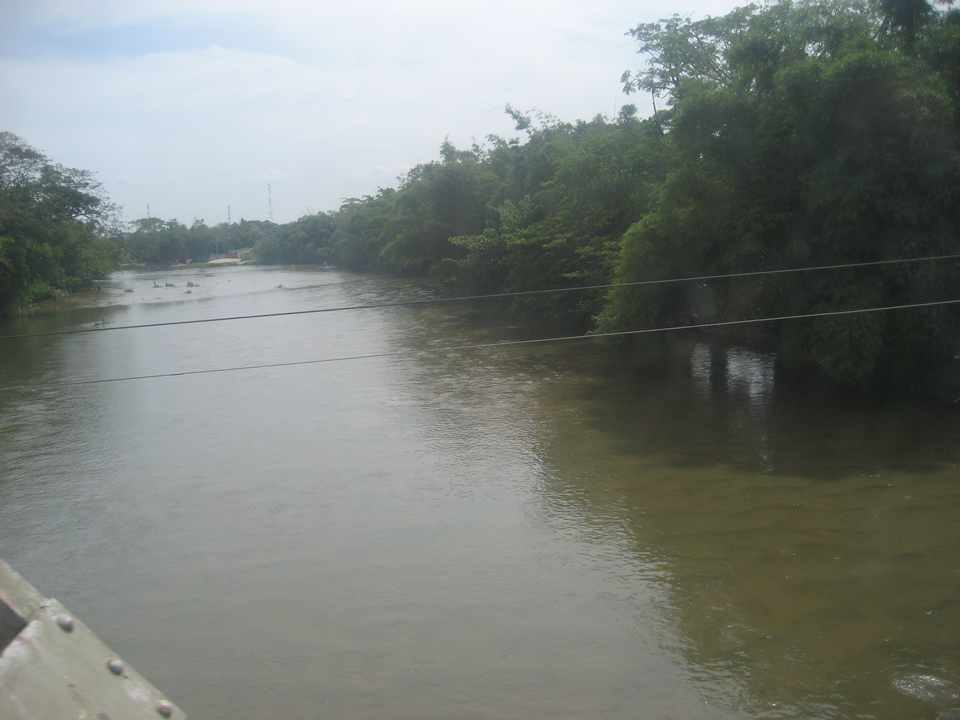
Fundación River

The Fundación River is a river in northern Colombia, originating from the Sierra Nevada de Santa Marta in the Cesar Department but flows down to the Magdalena Department crossing the town and municipality of Fundación before reaching the Ciénaga Grande de Santa Marta.
