= Río de Oro (Catatumbo) =

River in Colombia and Venezuela

Coordinates: 9.34417°N 71.7106°W

Rio de Oro is a river of Colombia and Venezuela.

== Geography ==
Río de Oro has its source on the eastern slope of the serranía de Los Motilones, in the Catatumbo Barí Natural Park (extreme north of the Norte de Santander Department of Colombia). It then flows eastward following the Venezuelan border, going to Venezuela then join the Catatumbo River in the state of Zulia.
