= Sarare River =

Location
- Country: Venezuela

Physical characteristics
- Mouth
  - coordinates: 7°11′07″N 71°12′27″W

Sarare River is a river of Venezuela. It is part of the Orinoco River watershed.

== See also ==
- List of rivers of Venezuela
