= San Miguel River (Colombia) =

River of Ecuador and Colombia

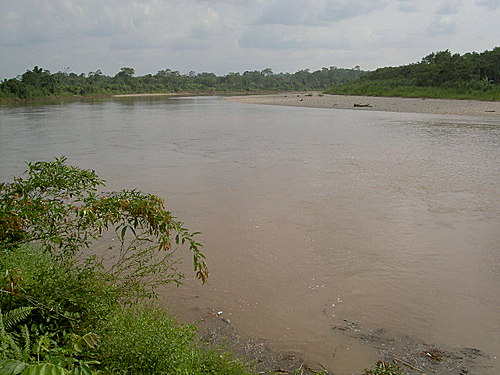
- Native name: Río San Miguel (Spanish)

Location
- Countries: Colombia; Ecuador

Physical characteristics
- Source: Andes Mountains
  - location: Nariño Department
  - elevation: 3,000 m (9,800 ft)
- Mouth: Putumayo River
  - location: Puerto El Carmen de Putumayo, Colombia
  - coordinates: 0°07′05″N 75°52′02″W
- Length: 295 km (183 mi)
- Discharge
  - location: mouth

The San Miguel River (Spanish: Río San Miguel) is a river in Colombia and Ecuador. It is a sub-tributary of the Solimões River (middle course of the Amazon) via the Putumayo River.

== Geography ==
The 295-km long San Miguel River rises on the slopes of the Andes Mountains, in the extreme south of the Colombian department of Nariño, on the border between Colombia and Ecuador. It then flows east, marking the border between the two countries, before passing through Ecuador and then joining the Putumayo River, again on the border, from the left at Puerto El Carmen de Putumayo.
