= Casanare River =

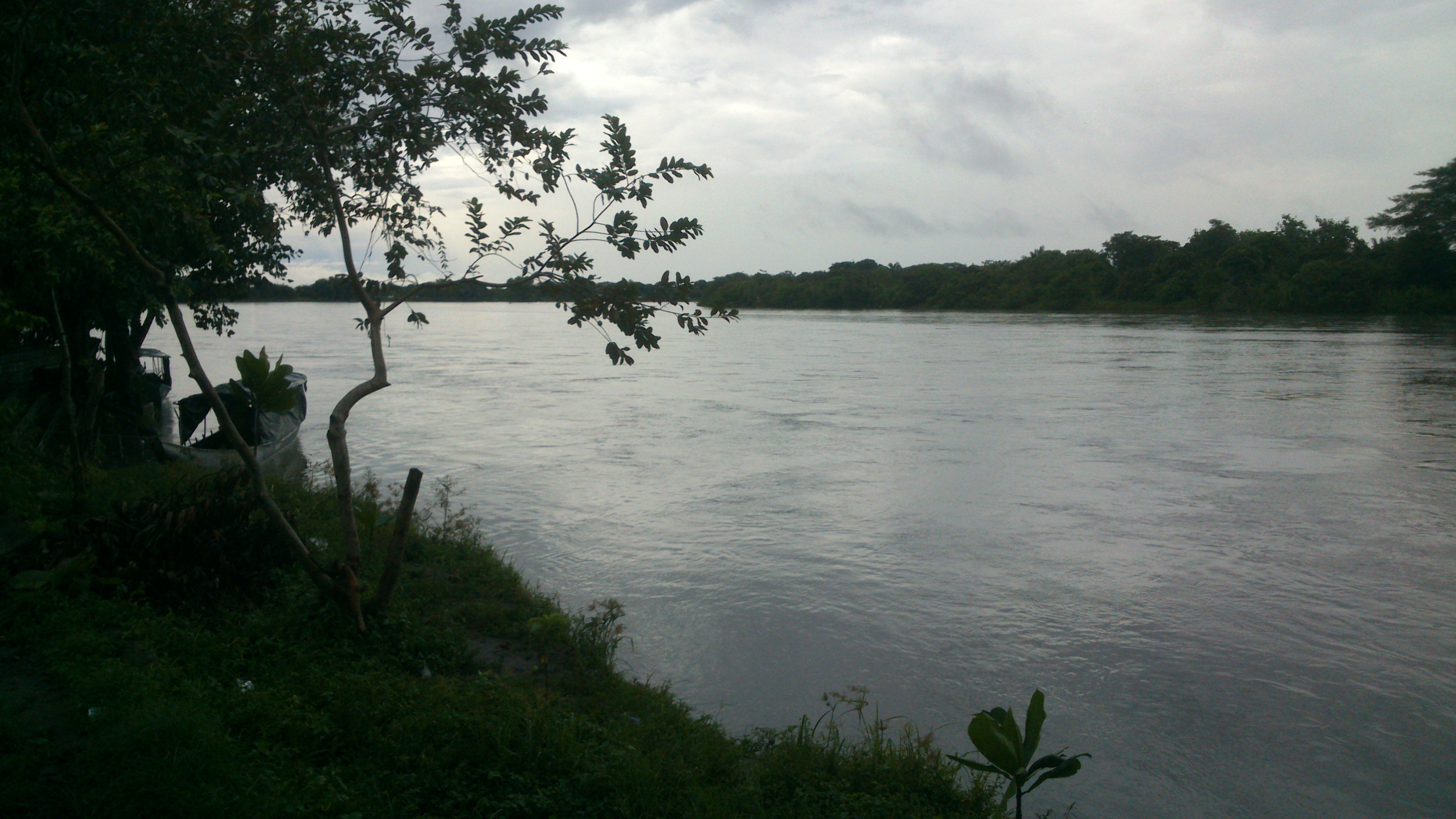

Location
- Country: Colombia

Physical characteristics
- Mouth
  - location: Meta, Colombia
- Length: 400 km (250 mi)
- Basin size: 24,013 km^{2} (9,271 sq mi)
- Discharge
  - location: Confluence of Meta, Colombia
  - average: 1,199 m^{3}/s (42,300 cu ft/s)

Casanare River (Spanish pronunciation: [kasaˈnaɾe]) is a river in Colombia. It is part of the Orinoco River basin.

== See also ==
- List of rivers of Colombia
