= Mira River (Ecuador and Colombia) =

River of South America

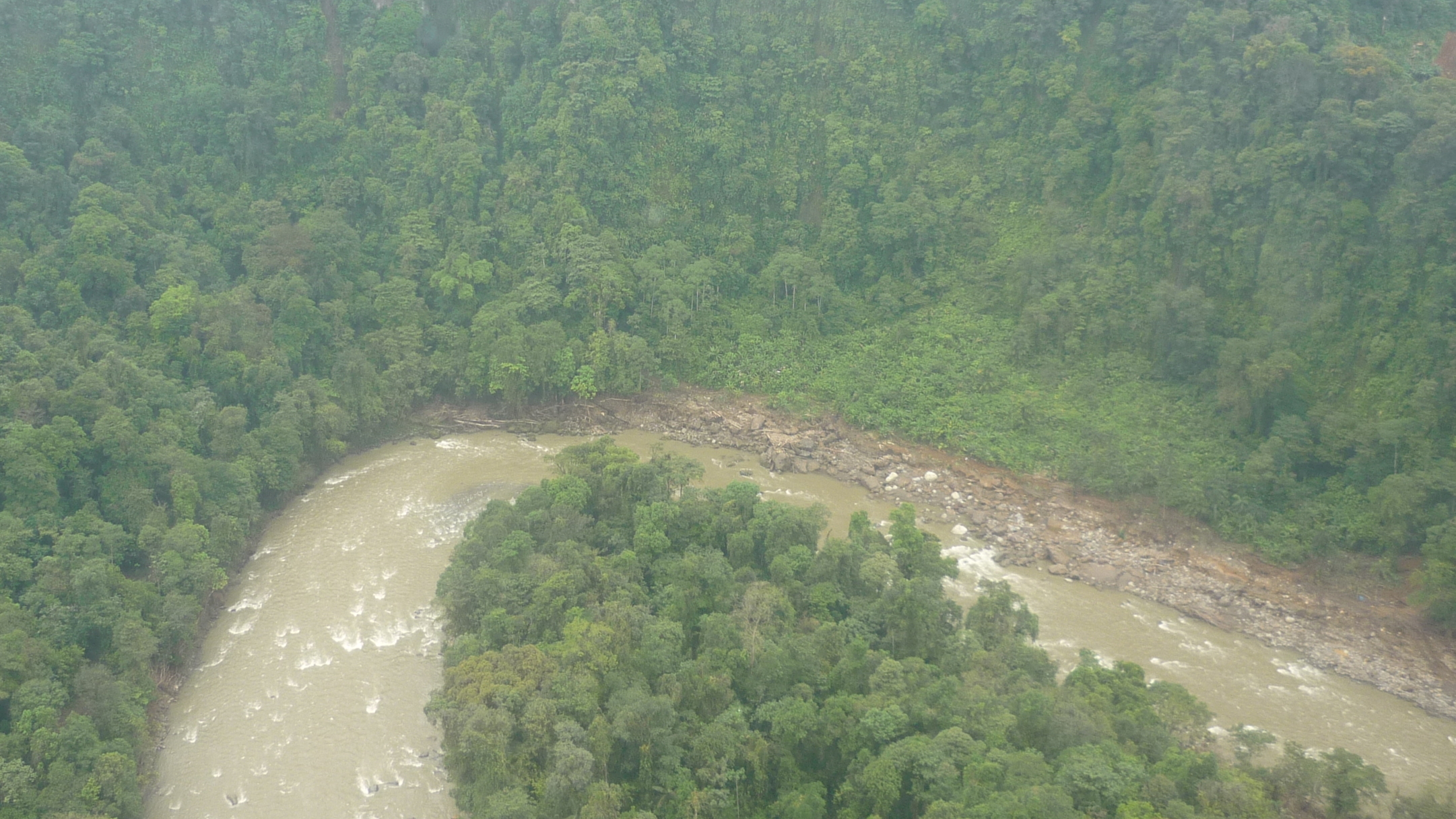

- Mira River mouth

Location
- Countries: Ecuador, Colombia

Physical characteristics
- Source
  - location: Puruanta Lake, Ecuador
- Mouth
  - location: Pacific Ocean
  - coordinates: 1°36′00″N 79°01′00″W
  - elevation: 0 m (0 ft)

The Mira River originates in the Andes of Ecuador and flows to the Pacific Ocean in Colombia. For a few kilometers it forms the border between the two countries. The upper course of the Mira is called the Chota River and is notable for its Afro-Ecuadorian inhabitants, its bomba music, and the large number of internationally prominent soccer players it has produced.

== Course ==
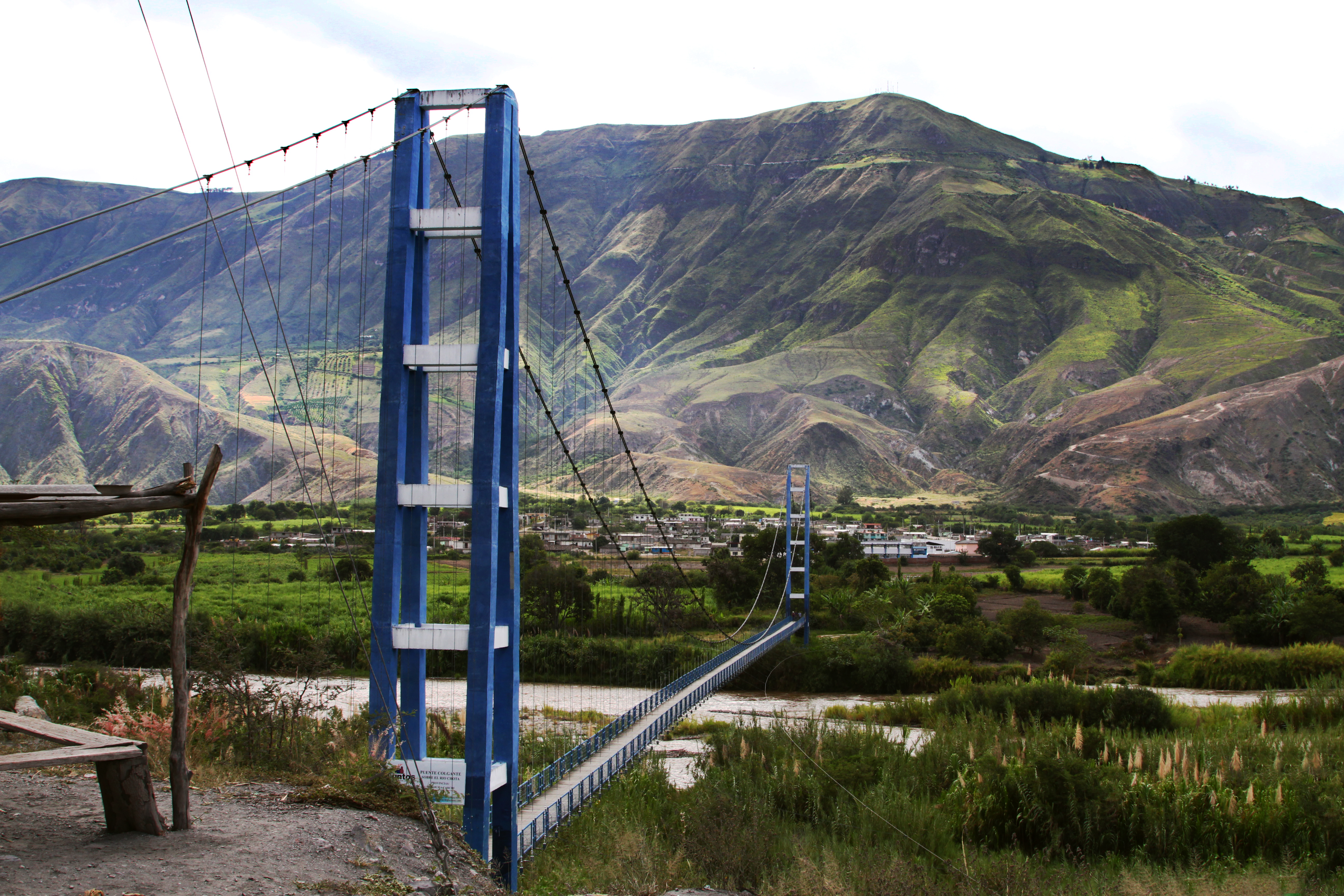
Pedestrian foot bridge across the Chota River at Pusir. 0° 27′ 33′ N 77° 59′ 50′ W

High Andes. The most distant source of the Mira River may be Puruanta Lake, located at an elevation of 3,473 metres (11,394 ft) in the Cayambe Coca Ecological Reserve of northern Ecuador. The cities of Ibarra and Otavalo are in the upper drainage basin of the river which includes most of Imbabura and Carchi provinces. The borders of the two provinces run roughly along the course of the Mira.

Chota River and Chota Valley. Several tributaries unite to form the Chota River north of the town of Pimampiro at an elevation of 1,700 metres (5,600 ft). The Chota valley, deep, but wide and fertile in places, extends along the river for about 35 kilometres (22 mi) to the village of Concepcion at an elevation of 1,300 metres (4,300 ft) Below the junction of the Chota and Piguchuela rivers, the river is called the Mira. The climate is semi-arid with precipitation on the valley floor as low as 500 millimetres (20 in) per year. Irrigation is necessary for most agriculture. The relatively low elevation (for the Andes) of the Chota Valley has resulted since prehistoric times in the valley being used to grow warm-climate and semi-tropical crops: coca, cotton, chile peppers, maize, and fruits. A class of traders called mindaeles, exchanged the semi-tropical crops of the valley with the people of the Pais Caraqui chiefdoms of the surrounding higher and cooler elevations. Beginning in the 16th century, the Spanish introduced additional crops, especially sugar cane, olives. and grapes.

Transition. A few miles north of Concepcion, the Mira begins its flow through a narrow, sparsely populated canyon bordered by forested uplands which persist to near the Colombian border, dropping in elevation over the course of 100 kilometres (62 mi) from 1,200 metres (3,900 ft) near Conception to 100 metres (330 ft). The Mira in this section and upstream in the Chota Valley is popular for rafting and kayaking as there are many Class III and IV rapids.

Coastal. The Mira River is navigable for the 88 kilometres (55 mi) it flows through Nariño Department of Colombia to the Pacific The Mira is joined by the San Juan River, a major tributary. This is a rainforest region with only a small population devoted mostly to the cultivation of bananas and African oil Palm.

== Afro-Ecuadorians, bomba, and soccer ==
African slaves were brought to Ecuador beginning in the 16th century. In the 17th and 18th century Jesuit missionaries owned most of the land in the Chota valley and imported Africans to work as slaves on their sugar cane plantations. By 1767, when the Jesuits were expelled from Latin America, the Jesuits owned 10 plantations and 1,769 slaves in the Chota valley. However, most of the Afro-Ecuadorians experienced little change with the departure of the Jesuits, continuing to be enslaved by the new owners of the plantations.

Slavery was abolished in Ecuador in 1852 and most of the Afro-Ecuadorian residents of the Chota Valley became landless sharecroppers, a condition which continued until the late 20th century. The population of the Chota Valley in 1987 was almost entirely Afro-Ecuadorian concentrated in 10 to 15 villages and totaling less than 15,000. The surrounding highlands had a mestizo and Indigenous population.

A few of the Afro-Ecuadorians obtained land after Land Reform legislation in 1964, but in the early 21st century, the majority of Afro-Ecuadorians in the Chota valley were still impoverished and landless or nearly landless.

The Chota valley is known for its bomba music which features African drums mixed with indigenous and Spanish influences. It has also become known as the origin of many of Ecuador's finest soccer players. The 2002 Ecuadorian team, which qualified for the FIFA World Cup, had seven Afro-Ecuadorians from the Chota valley on its 23-man roster. This despite the absence of grass soccer fields and training facilities for young players in the Chota valley.

== See also ==
- List of rivers of Ecuador
