= Economy of Colombia =

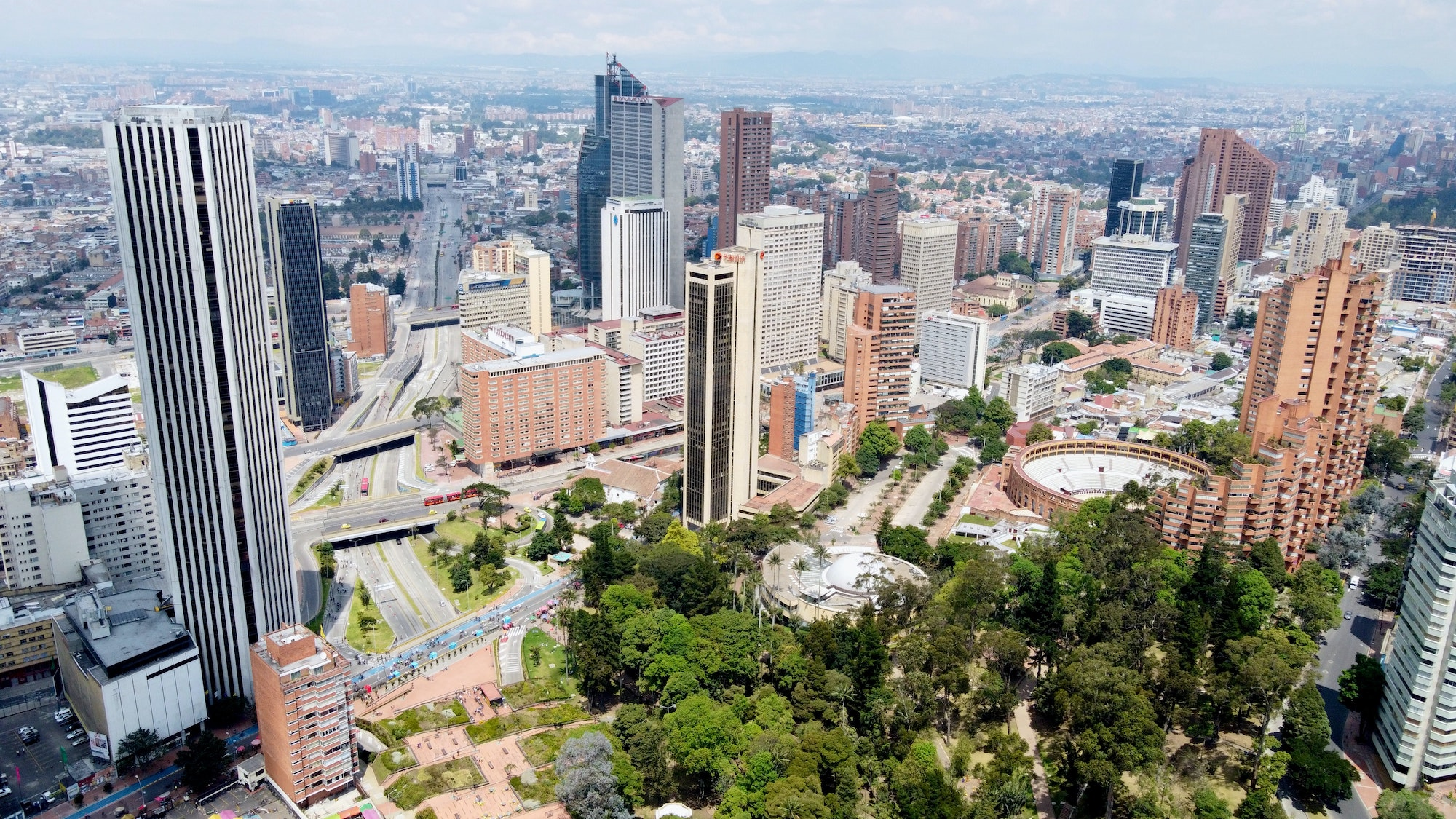
- Bogotá, the financial centre of Colombia
- Currency: Colombian peso (COP)
- Fiscal year: Calendar year
- Trade organizations: WTO, OECD, Pacific Alliance, CAN
- Country group: Developing/emerging; Upper middle income economy

Statistics
- Population: ▲52,400,145 (2023)
- GDP: ▲$572.74 billion (nominal; 2026); ▲$1.26 trillion (PPP; 2026)
- GDP rank: 32nd (nominal; 2026); 31st (PPP; 2026)
- GDP growth: 2.2% (2026); 2.3% (2027); 2.4% (2028)
- GDP per capita: ▲$10,726 (nominal; 2026); ▲$23,634 (PPP; 2026)
- GDP per capita rank: 87th (nominal; 2026); 87th (PPP; 2026)
- GDP per capita growth: 1.6% (2025)
- GDP by sector: agriculture: 7.2%; industry: 30.8%; services: 62.1%; (2017 est.)
- Inflation (CPI): ▼6.6% (2024)
- Population below national poverty line: ▼31.8% in poverty (2024); ▼37% on less than $8.30/day (2024)
- Gini coefficient: ▼54.4 high (2024)
- Human Development Index: ▲0.788 high (2023) (83rd); ▲0.593 medium IHDI (96th) (2023)
- Labor force: ▲27,099,025 (2025); ▲58.6% employment rate (2025)
- Labor force by occupation: agriculture: 17%; industry: 21%; services: 62%; (2011 est.)
- Unemployment: ▼8.3% (2025)
- Youth unemployment: ▼17.7% (2025)
- Average gross salary: Col$1,761,494 / $384 monthly (2022)
- Main industries: textiles, food processing, oil, clothing and footwear, beverages, chemicals, cement; gold, coal, emeralds, shipbuilding, electronics industry, home appliance

External
- Exports: ▼$68.273 billion (2023 est.)
- Export goods: petroleum, coal, coffee, gold, bananas, cut flowers, coke (fuel), ferroalloys, emeralds
- Main export partners: United States 25.8%; European Union 14.1%; Panama 9.69%; India 4.23%; Brazil 3.96%; Turkey 3.76%; China 3.67%; (2022)
- Imports: ▼$76.23 billion (2023 est.)
- Import goods: industrial equipment, transportation equipment, electric machinery and equipment, organic chemicals, pharmaceutical products, medical and optical equipment
- Main import partners: United States 26.4%; China 24.6%; European Union 11.8%; Brazil 7.02%; Mexico 4.8%; India 2.16%; Japan 2.05%; Argentina 1.99%; (2022)
- FDI stock: ▲$179.6 billion (31 December 2017 est.); ▲ Abroad: $55.51 billion (31 December 2017 est.)
- Current account: ▲ −$10.36 billion (2017 est.)
- Gross external debt: ▲$124.6 billion (31 December 2017 est.)

Public finance
- Government debt: ▼49.4% of GDP (2017 est.) (Note: data cover general government debt, and includes debt instruments issued (or owned) by government entities other than the treasury; the data include treasury debt held by foreign entities; the data include debt issued by subnational entities)
- Foreign reserves: ▲$47.13 billion (31 December 2017 est.)
- Budget balance: −2.7% (of GDP) (2017 est.)
- Revenue: 83.35 billion (2017 est.)
- Spending: 91.73 billion (2017 est.)
- Economic aid: $32 billion
- Credit rating: Standard & Poor's: BBB+ (Domestic); BBB (Foreign); A-(T&C Assessment)
- All values, unless otherwise stated, are in US dollars.

Colombia has the fourth largest economy in Latin America as measured by gross domestic product and the third-largest economy in South America. Throughout most of the 20th century, Colombia was Latin America's 4th and 3rd largest economy when measured by nominal GDP, real GDP, GDP (PPP), and real GDP at chained PPPs. Between 2012 and 2014, it became the third largest in Latin America by nominal GDP. As of 2024, the GDP (PPP) per capita has increased to over Int$19,000, and real gross domestic product at chained PPPs increased from Int$250 billion in 1990 to over Int$1 trillion in 2024. Poverty levels were as high as 65% in 1990, but decreased to under 30% by 2014, and 27% by 2018. They decreased by an average of 1.35% per year since 1990.

Petroleum is Colombia's main export, representing over 45% of Colombia's exports. Manufacturing represents nearly 12% of Colombia's exports and grows at a rate of over 10% a year. Colombia has the fastest growing information technology industry in the world, and has the longest fibre optic network in Latin America. Colombia also has one of the largest shipbuilding industries in the world outside Asia.

Modern industries like shipbuilding, electronics, automobile, tourism, construction, and mining grew dramatically during the 2000s and 2010s. However, most of Colombia's exports are still commodity-based. Colombia is Latin America's 2nd-largest producer of domestically made electronics and appliances, following Mexico.

Since the early 2010s, the Colombian government has shown interest in exporting modern Colombian pop culture to the world (which includes video games, music, films, television shows, fashion, cosmetics, and food) as a way of diversifying the economy and entirely changing the image of Colombia. This has inspired a national campaign similar to the Korean Wave. Colombia is only behind Mexico in cultural exports and is already a regional leader in cosmetic and beauty exports.

Wealth is poorly distributed and Colombia is among the most unequal societies in the world, with a Gini index of approximately 0.̟6. For example, according to the World Bank, in 2010, the richest 20% of the population owned 60.2% of the wealth and the poorest 20% only 3%, and 15.8% of Colombians lived on less than $2 a day. In 2021, more than 54% of Colombian families were food insecure and more than 560,000 children under the age of five were chronically undernourished.

The informal economy is estimated at 47% in 2020. There is no welfare state in Colombia, which has almost no unemployment or pension insurance system. As a result, only one million elderly people have pensions (and five million are without) and social assistance is very low. Many people in their 70s and 80s are forced to continue working or beg. The country is said to be the most unequal in the Organisation for Economic Co-operation and Development (OECD).

== History ==
=== 16th–19th centuries ===
European explorers reached what is now Colombian territory as early as 1510 in Santa María Antigua del Darién (in present-day Chocó department). For the next couple of decades Colombia, and South America in general, remained largely unexplored. From 1533 to 1600, Europeans began expeditions into the interior of current Colombia. The intent of these expeditions was mainly to conquer new lands and exploit village resources. Legends of El Dorado that reached Spaniard explorers continued to fuel exploration and raiding of Indian villages.

In the 17th century, Spanish conquerors explored Colombia and made the first settlements, and this was the beginning of Colombia's modern economic history. Major conquistadors from this period were Pedro de Heredia, Gonzalo Jimenez de Quesada, Sebastián de Belalcazar, and Nikolaus Federmann.

During the 16th and 17th centuries, the colonial settlements in Colombia served purposes of extraction of precious metals and other natural resources, and later slavery trade. This economic arrangement left the Colony with little room for building solid institutionality for economic development. The main non-extractive institutions emerging in this centuries were the fortified port of Cartagena and the Viceroyalty of New Granada. Cartagena developed military defenses mainly out of necessity from frequently having to deal with pirate attacks. A primitive form of colonial administration was organized in Santa fé de Bogotá with the Viceroyalty of New Granada, especially under the tenure of José Solís Folch de Cardona (1753–1761), who conducted a census and built roads, bridges and aqueducts.

Following the Thousand Days' War (1899–1902), Colombia experienced a coffee boom that catapulted the country into the modern period, bringing the attendant benefits of transportation, particularly railroads, communications infrastructure, and the first major attempts at manufacturing.

=== 20th century ===
Colombia's consistently sound economic policies and aggressive promotion of free trade agreements in recent years have bolstered its ability to weather external shocks. Real GDP has grown more than 4% per year for the past three years, continuing almost a decade of strong economic performance.

In 1990, the administration of President César Gaviria Trujillo (1990–94) initiated economic liberalism policies or "apertura economica" and this has continued since then, with tariff reductions, financial deregulation, privatization of state-owned enterprises, and adoption of a more liberal foreign exchange rate. Almost all sectors became open to foreign investment although agricultural products remained protected.

The original idea of his then Minister of Finance, Rudolf Homes, was that the country should import agricultural products in which it was not competitive, like maize, wheat, cotton and soybeans and export the ones in which it had an advantage, like fruits and flowers. In ten years, the sector lost 7,000 km^{2} to imports, with a critical impact on employment in rural areas. Still, this policy makes food cheaper for the average Colombian than it would be if agricultural trade were more restricted.

Until 1997, Colombia had enjoyed a fairly stable economy. The first five years of liberalization were characterized by high economic growth rates of between 4% and 5%. The Ernesto Samper administration (1994–98) emphasized social welfare policies which targeted Colombia's lower income population. These reforms led to higher government spending which increased the fiscal deficit and public sector debt, the financing of which required higher interest rates. An over-valued peso inherited from the previous administration was maintained.

The economy slowed, and by 1998 GDP growth was only 0.6%. In 1999, the country fell into its first recession since the Great Depression. The economy shrank by 4.5% with unemployment at over 20%. While unemployment remained at 20% in 2000, GDP growth recovered to 3.1%. Unemployment in 2020 has improved compared to two decades ago to 12.20%.

The administration of President Andrés Pastrana Arango, when it took office on 7 August 1998, faced an economy in crisis, with the difficult internal security situation and global economic turbulence additionally inhibiting confidence. As evidence of a serious recession became clear in 1999, the government took a number of steps. It engaged in a series of controlled devaluations of the peso, followed by a decision to let it float. Colombia also entered into an agreement with the International Monetary Fund which provided a $2.7 billion guarantee (extended funds facility), while committing the government to budget discipline and structural reforms.

=== 21st century ===
By early 2000 there had been the beginning of an economic recovery, with the export sector leading the way, as it enjoyed the benefit of the more competitive exchange rate, as well as strong prices for petroleum, Colombia's leading export product. Prices of coffee, the other principal export product, have been more variable.

Economic growth reached 3.1% during 2000 and inflation 9.0%. Inflation by 2021 has stabilized at 3.30%. Colombia's international reserves remained stable at around $8.35 billion in the year 2000 growing to $58.57 billion by 2021, and Colombia has successfully remained in international capital markets. Colombia's total foreign debt at the end of 1999 was $34.5 billion with $14.7 billion in private sector and $19.8 billion in public sector debt. Major international credit rating organizations had dropped Colombian sovereign debt below investment grade, primarily as a result of large fiscal deficits, which current policies are seeking to close.

Former president Álvaro Uribe (elected 7 August 2002) introduced several neoliberal economic reforms, including measures designed to reduce the public-sector deficit below 2.5% of GDP in 2004. The government's economic policy and controversial democratic security strategy have engendered a growing sense of confidence in the economy, particularly within the business sector, and GDP growth in 2003 was among the highest in Latin America, at over 4%. This growth rate was maintained over the next decade, averaging 4.8% from 2004 to 2014.

According to figures from Dane, monetary poverty went from 37.2% in 2010 to 26.9% in 2017, which indicates a higher income for the most vulnerable households. During the Santos government, there was an inflationary period that was also a response to the strong external shock of the fall in oil prices. It was a period of contained instability, although inflation increased, no company declared bankruptcy and there was no instability in the financial system.

The Santos period managed an increase in GDP of 4% in 2010, which peaked in 2011 to 6.6%. Thereafter it remained at 4% in 2012, 4.9% in 2013 and 4.4% in 2014. In 2011, Colombia recovered its BBB− investment grade, which was raised in 2013 to BBB. As a result of sustained growth, during the eight years of the Santos government, 3.5 million jobs were created, while 5.4 million people were lifted out of poverty.

The focus of Santos' second term was to reach a peace agreement with the FARC whose economic effects, according to assumptions, could imply a GDP growth of up to two additional percentage points. Santos' best legacy is precisely the one related to security since this will have an effect in the medium and long term in terms of investment decisions, job creation, and the beginning of a great revolution in the country's infrastructure: war prevented development in the most affected areas for centuries.

Colombia's President Iván Duque withdrew a controversial tax reform bill following four weeks of huge protests across the country starting 28 April 2021. In 2021, Colombia registered an increase in Gross Domestic Product of more than 10%, as a result of a rebound effect that derived from the 6.8% collapse a year earlier, caused by the economic closures decreed to stop the coronavirus pandemic. The pandemic exacerbated poverty. In 2021, official figures showed that 39% of Colombians – out of a population of 51.6 million inhabitants – were in a condition of monetary poverty. Although it shows a slight improvement compared to 2020 (42.5%), it meant a setback of at least a decade.

The greatest increase in the value of the debt also occurred in the Duque government, according to figures from the Bank of the Republic. Between 2020 and 2021 the balance increased by 17 billion dollars, and from 2019 to 2020 it increased by 16 billion. That figure, which corresponds to a deficit of 7.1 percent of GDP, was the debt that the Central National Government or GNC (the State without its companies or regional entities) had in 2021, according to the fiscal closing bulletin.

In the Duque government, specifically between May and June 2020, 66.7 percent of the country's gold reserves were sold, which went from 710.5 to 237.4 million dollars. The decision was made by the Bank of the Republic. The sale received criticism because although it was done at a time of rising prices – after five years in which this did not happen – it was before gold reached a record price.

The COVID-19 recession had a profound impact on Colombia's economy, with significant disruptions to GDP components, unemployment, and inflation. Household consumption, which is a key driver of the economy, saw the sharpest decline, dropping by 20% in the second quarter of 2020 due to lockdowns, income uncertainty, and limited mobility. Despite a partial recovery in Q3 2020, high unemployment (peaking at 19.9%) and ongoing uncertainties slowed the recovery of consumer spending. Investment also decreased during the pandemic, with businesses reducing capital expenditures amid uncertainty (-31.6%). Although investment exhibited a significant recovery in Q3 2020, reaching 26%, the drop in global demand for Colombia's exports—particularly oil and coal—influenced a slow recovery as indicated by 10% growth rate of real GDP following a 16% trough. Government spending rose in response to the pandemic, driven by fiscal stimulus and social aid programs, helping to stabilize the economy.

The deterioration of the labor market severely affected sectors such as retail, hospitality, and informal employment, deepening the economic contraction. Although unemployment gradually decreased to 14.75% by early 2021, it stayed significantly above the pre-pandemic levels. Inflation, on the other hand, remained low in Q1 2020, but turned into deflation for the remaining of 2020 and the first quarter of 2021, signaling a significant weakened aggregate demand. Overall, Colombia's real GDP contracted by about 16% in Q2 2020, due to declines in household consumption and investment. While there were modest signs of recovery by early 2021, the combination of high unemployment and deflation continued to hinder the full economic rebound.

== Overview ==
In the early 21st century, the Colombian economy grew in part because of austere government budgets, focused efforts to reduce public debt levels, an export-oriented growth strategy, an improved security situation in the country, and high commodity prices. Growth slowed to 1.4 percent in 2017, and then increased to 3.3 percent in 2019.

President Uribe, who was in office from 2002 to 2010, examined opportunities including reforming the pension system, reducing high unemployment, achieving congressional passage of a fiscal transfers reform, and exploring for new oil or producing ethanol. Colombia's Gini coefficient, a measure of inequality, was one of the highest in South America. International and domestic financial analysts warned of the growing central government deficit, which hovered at 5% of GDP. Nonetheless, confidence in the economy grew.

The middle class will represent 25% of the population in 2020 according to a survey by the daily newspaper El Tiempo. Official data indicate that 42.5% of the population lives below the poverty line. The social elevator is one of the slowest in the world, as it takes an average of eleven generations for a family to rise out of poverty.

The tax system is one of the causes of Colombia's deep social inequalities. The income tax (IRPP) is not very progressive (almost all taxpayers pay it at a rate of between 19% and 28%, and the rate rises only slightly thereafter) and is levied mainly on salaries, with other categories of income being largely underreported. Redistribution through the Colombian tax system is thus the lowest in Latin America, even though it is on average very limited.

=== Informal economy ===
Informal economy in Colombia is a significant, persistent and structural issue, with approximately 56% to over 60% of workers engaged in informal jobs without social security benefits. Driven by high formalization costs, rigid labor regulations and low education levels, this sector encompassed street vendors, micro-enterprises and unregistered businesses.

=== Development of main indicators ===
The following table shows the main economic indicators in 1980–2025 (with IMF staff estimates in 2026–2031). Inflation below 5% is in green.

Year	GDP (in bn. US$PPP)	GDP per capita (in US$ PPP)	GDP (in bn. US$nominal)	GDP per capita (in US$ nominal)	GDP growth (real)	Inflation rate (in percent)	Unemployment (in percent)	Government debt (in % of GDP)
1980	77.4	2,802.0	46.5	1,682.4	▲4.4%	▲25.9%	5.4%	n/a
1981	▲86.7	▲3,068.5	▲50.7	▲1,793.0	▲2.3%	▲27.4%	▲6.6%	n/a
1982	▲92.9	▲3,218.4	▲54.3	▲1,878.9	▲0.9%	▲24.9%	▲7.1%	n/a
1983	▲98.1	▲3,325.3	▼53.9	▼1,827.9	▲1.6%	▲19.5%	▲8.7%	n/a
1984	▲105.0	▲3,486.8	▼53.3	▼1,767.9	▲3.4%	▲16.3%	▲9.0%	n/a
1985	▲111.7	▲3,734.1	▼48.6	▼1,623.7	▲3.1%	▲23.9%	▼8.7%	n/a
1986	▲120.6	▲3,949.2	48.6	▼1,592.8	▲5.8%	▲18.8%	▼7.7%	n/a
1987	▲130.2	▲4,176.8	▲50.6	▲1,624.1	▲5.4%	▲23.3%	▼7.4%	n/a
1988	▲140.3	▲4,407.6	▲54.6	▲1,714.9	▲4.1%	▲28.1%	▼6.5%	n/a
1989	▲150.8	▲4,640.5	▲55.0	▼1,694.1	▲3.4%	▲25.9%	▲6.8%	n/a
1990	▲163.1	▲4,920.1	▲56.1	▼1,691.1	▲4.3%	▲29.1%	▼6.6%	n/a
1991	▲172.7	▲5,101.2	▲58.0	▲1,712.3	▲2.4%	▲30.3%	▼6.4%	n/a
1992	▲184.3	▲5,337.8	▲68.6	▲1,986.5	▲4.4%	▲27.0%	▼5.9%	n/a
1993	▲199.4	▲5,668.2	▲77.7	▲2,209.2	▲5.7%	▲22.4%	▼5.0%	n/a
1994	▲214.2	▲5,979.2	▲97.7	▲2,726.8	▲5.1%	▲22.9%	▼4.9%	n/a
1995	▲230.0	▲6,314.7	▲110.6	▲3,035.3	▲5.2%	▲20.9%	▲5.6%	n/a
1996	▲239.0	▲6,457.4	▲116.1	▲3,137.1	▲2.1%	▲20.8%	▲7.8%	23.3%
1997	▲251.5	▲6,706.0	▲127.5	▲3,399.3	▲3.4%	▲18.5%	▲7.9%	▲25.3%
1998	▲255.8	▲6,715.7	▼117.7	▼3,090.9	▲0.6%	▲18.7%	▲9.7%	▲27.5%
1999	▼248.5	▼6,442.2	▼103.1	▼2,673.7	▼−4.2%	▲10.9%	▲13.1%	▲34.0%
2000	▲261.6	▲6,680.5	▼99.3	▼2,535.5	▲2.9%	▲9.2%	▲13.3%	▲38.0%
2001	▲271.9	▲6,857.4	▼97.6	▼2,461.3	▲1.7%	▲8.0%	▲15.0%	▲41.1%
2002	▲283.1	▲7,049.4	▼97.4	▼2,424.3	▲2.5%	▲6.4%	▲15.6%	▲47.5%
2003	▲300.0	▲7,377.4	▼94.1	▼2,313.5	▲3.9%	▲7.1%	▼14.1%	▼45.0%
2004	▲324.5	▲7,882.1	▲116.4	▲2,827.2	▲5.3%	▲5.9%	▼13.7%	▼41.5%
2005	▲349.5	▲8,387.6	▲145.6	▲3,494.0	▲4.4%	▲5.0%	▼11.8%	▼38.5%
2006	▲384.5	▲9,118.1	▲161.8	▲3,836.7	▲6.7%	▲4.3%	▲12.0%	▼36.0%
2007	▲421.5	▲9,881.6	▲206.2	▲4,834.4	▲6.7%	▲5.5%	▼11.2%	▼32.7%
2008	▲443.8	▲10,288.0	▲242.5	▲5,622.1	▲3.3%	▲7.0%	▲11.3%	▼32.4%
2009	▲451.6	▲10,355.4	▼232.5	▼5,330.7	▲1.1%	▲4.2%	11.3%	▲35.4%
2010	▲477.6	▲10,833.9	▲286.5	▲6,498.6	▲4.5%	▲2.3%	▼11.2%	▲36.5%
2011	▲521.3	▲11,701.7	▲335.0	▲7,518.4	▲6.9%	▲3.4%	▼10.1%	▼35.8%
2012	▲551.8	▲12,262.4	▲370.7	▲8,237.2	▲3.9%	▲3.2%	▼9.9%	▼34.0%
2013	▲590.0	▲12,986.4	▲382.1	▲8,409.7	▲5.1%	▲2.0%	▼8.6%	▲37.6%
2014	▲627.3	▲13,677.3	▼381.2	▼8,312.1	▲4.5%	▲2.9%	▲9.0%	▲43.3%
2015	▲651.9	▲14,074.8	▼293.5	▼6,337.0	▲3.0%	▲5.0%	▼8.8%	▲50.4%
2016	▲671.8	▲14,345.3	▼282.7	▼6,037.1	▲2.1%	▲7.5%	▲9.1%	▼49.9%
2017	▲693.1	▲14,616.9	▲311.9	▲6,577.3	▲1.4%	▲4.3%	▼8.9%	▼49.4%
2018	▲747.1	▲15,481.4	▲334.1	▲6,923.7	▲2.6%	▲3.2%	▲10.0%	▲51.8%
2019	▲807.6	▲16,349.3	▼323.1	▼6,540.1	▲3.2%	▲3.5%	▼9.9%	▼51.0%
2020	▼785.7	▼15,587.6	▼270.3	▼5,363.2	▼−7.2%	▲2.5%	▲13.9%	▲65.3%
2021	▲906.0	▲17,724.7	▲318.5	▲6,231.3	▲10.8%	▲3.5%	▼11.1%	▼64.4%
2022	▲1,041.9	▲20,158.9	▲345.6	▲6,687.5	▲7.3%	▲10.2%	▼10.3%	▼61.3%
2023	▲1,090.0	▲20,875.5	▲366.9	▲7,026.6	▲0.8%	▲11.7%	▼10.0%	▼55.4%
2024	▲1,134.6	▲21,532.0	▲420.5	▲7,979.8	▲1.5%	▲6.6%	▼9.1%	▲61.0%
2025	▲1,194.4	▲22,516.3	▲457.1	▲8,616.6	▲2.6%	▲5.1%	▼8.0%	▼59.9%
2026 est.	▲1,262.0	▲23,634.2	▲572.7	▲10,725.5	▲2.2%	▲6.0%	▲9.0%	▼59.5%
2027 est.	▲1,331.4	▲24,788.3	▲634.7	▲11,816.7	▲2.3%	▲5.7%	▲10.0%	▲62.9%
2028 est.	▲1,391.6	▲25,769.6	▲663.3	▲12,282.3	▲2.4%	▲3.9%	10.0%	▲65.1%
2029 est.	▲1,454.9	▲26,808.8	▲694.0	▲12,787.8	▲2.6%	▲3.3%	10.0%	▲65.9%
2030 est.	▲1,523.2	▲27,939.0	▲727.4	▲13,341.9	▲2.8%	▲3.0%	10.0%	▼65.7%
2031 est.	▲1,594.7	▲29,128.8	▲762.7	▲13,930.6	▲2.9%	▲3.0%	10.0%	▼65.3%

=== Graphics ===
Colombia GDP by sector in 2017
1. Agriculture, livestock, hunting, forestry and fishing (6.30%)
2. Mining and quarrying (6.10%)
3. Manufacturing (10.9%)
4. Electricity, gas and water supply industry (3.30%)
5. Construction (7.20%)
6. Trade, hotels, restaurants and repairs (12.2%)
7. Transport, storage and communications (7.00%)
8. Financial services industry (21.2%)
9. Social services sector (15.6%)
10. Total taxes (10.2%)

Composition of the Colombian GDP by demand side. Second quarter of 2015.
Household final consumption expenditure	64.72%
Government final consumption expenditure	17.24%
Gross fixed capital formation	28.30%
Inventory investment	0.41%
Exports	15.32%
Imports	26.98%

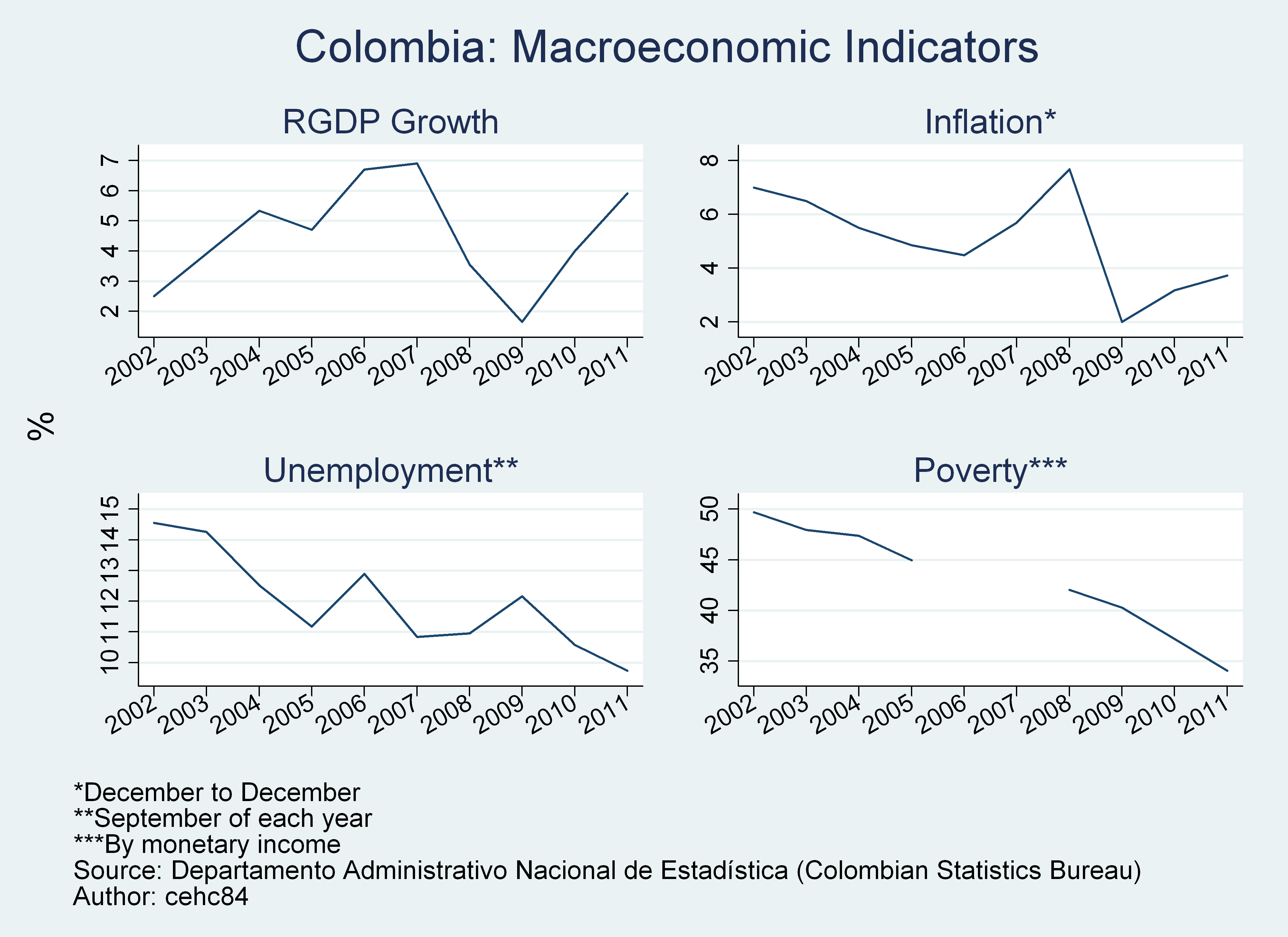
Colombia – macroeconomic indicators 2002–2011

== Sectors ==
=== Agriculture ===
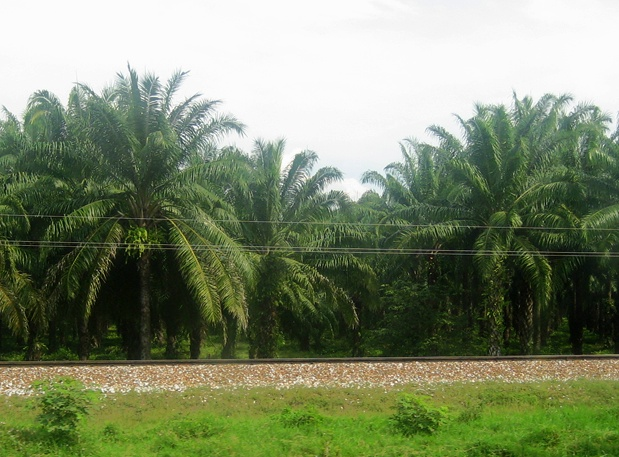
Palm plantation in Magdalena. Colombia is one of the top five producers of palm oil in the world.

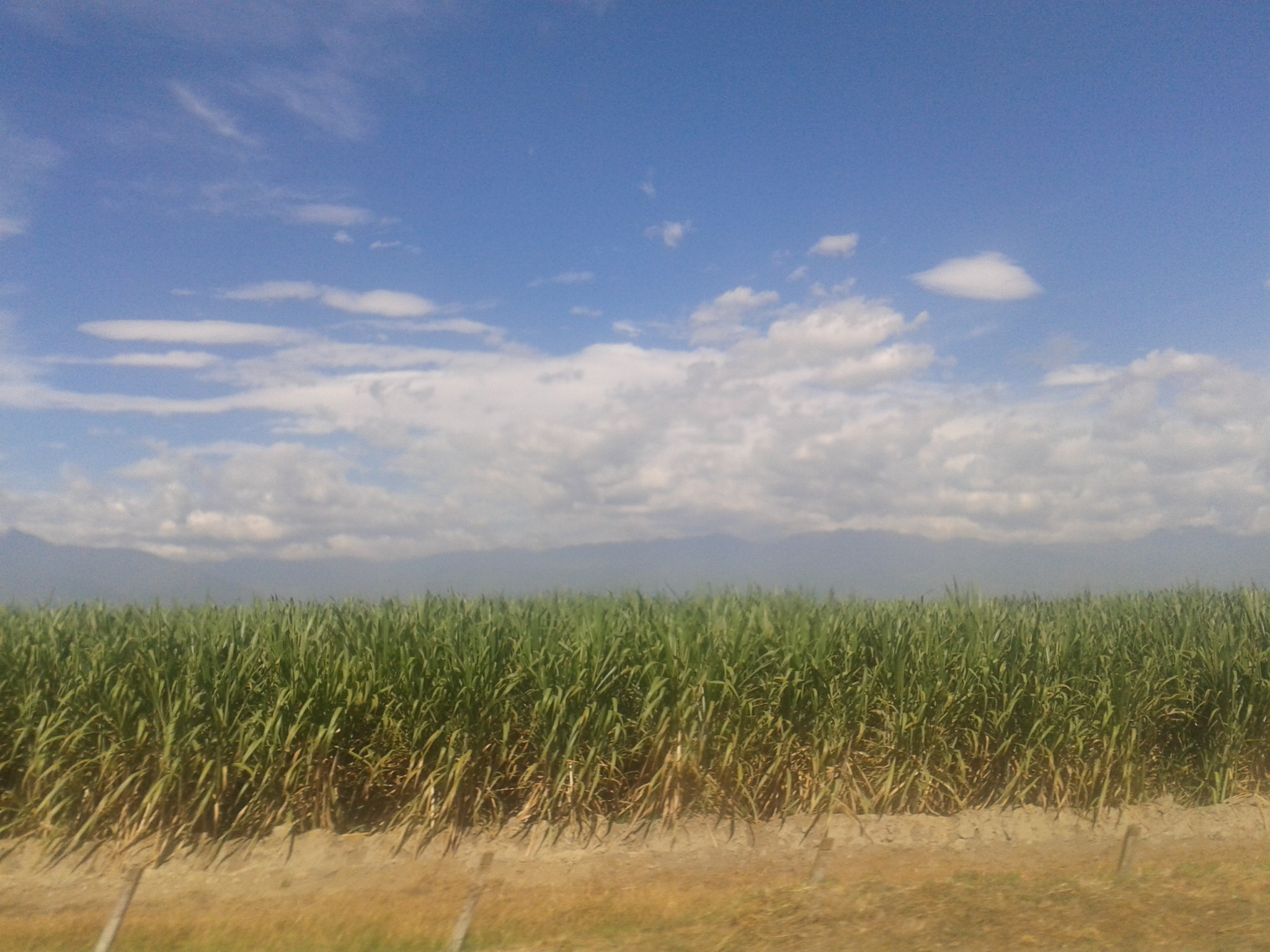
Sugar cane in Valle del Cauca. Colombia is one of the top 10 sugarcane producers in the world.

Colombia is one of the five largest producers in the world of coffee, avocado and palm oil, and one of the 10 largest producers in the world of sugarcane, banana, pineapple and cocoa.

Colombia produced, in 2018, 36.2 million tons of sugarcane (7th largest producer in the world), 5.8 million tons of palm oil (5th largest producer in the world), 3.7 million tons of banana (11th largest producer in the world) and 720 thousand tons of coffee (4th largest producer in the world, behind Brazil, Vietnam and Indonesia). Although its neighbor Brazil is the largest producer of coffee in the world (3.5 million tons produced in the same year), the advertising carried out by the country for decades suggests that Colombian coffee is of higher quality, which generates greater added value to the country's product. In the same year, Colombia produced 3.3 million tons of rice, 3.1 million tons of potato, 2.2 million tons of cassava, 1.3 million tons of maize, 900 thousand tons of pineapple, 670 thousand tons of onion, 527 thousand tons of tomato, 419 thousand tons of yam, 338 thousand tons of mango, 326 thousand tons of avocado, in addition to smaller productions of other agricultural products such as orange, tangerine, lemon, papaya, beans, carrot, coconut, watermelon etc. As of October 2024, Colombia is the tenth largest producer of cacao in the global market. Its top importers include the United States, Chile, Ecuador, and Venezuela.

The share of agriculture in GDP has fallen consistently since 1945, as industry and services have expanded. However, Colombia's agricultural share of GDP decreased during the 1990s by less than in many of the world's countries at a similar level of development, even though the share of coffee in GDP diminished in a dramatic way. Agriculture has nevertheless remained an important source of employment, providing a fifth of Colombia's jobs in 2006.

Agriculture in Colombia is particularly vulnerable to climate-induced events like La Niña, leading to droughts and heavy rains. Soil aridity, erosion, and desertification are already pressing issues in Colombian agriculture, expected to worsen with climate change. Despite representing only 0.4 percent of global greenhouse gas emissions, 71.3 percent of Colombia's domestic emissions stem from agriculture and land use. Colombia's revised National Determined Contributions (NDCs) aim to reduce emissions by 51% by 2030, with a focus on agriculture. Strategies include reducing greenhouse gas emissions in cocoa, rice, coffee, forestry, and cattle production. The country also aims to provide agroclimatic information to 1 million producers by 2030.

=== Livestock ===
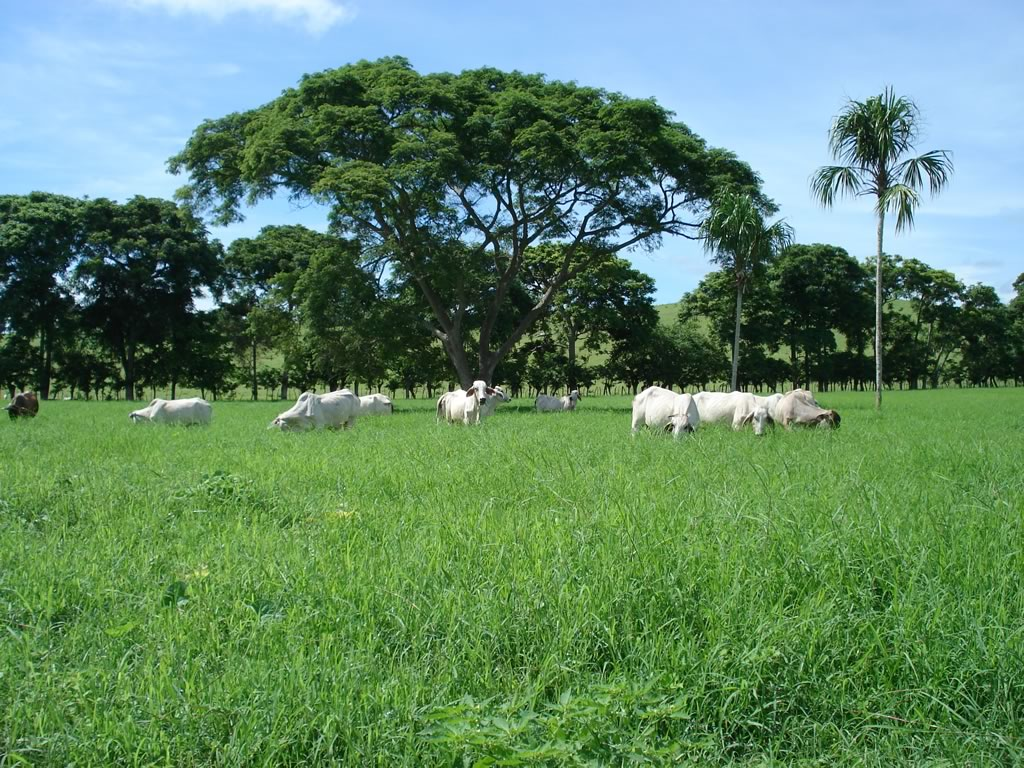
Livestock in Córdoba. Colombia is one of the 20 largest producers of beef in the world.

In the production of beef and chicken meat, Colombia is among the 20 largest producers in the world.

In Colombia, the exploitation and breeding of cattle is carried out on small farms and large farms. Black-eared white, casanareño, coastal with horns, romosinuano, chino santandereano and hartón del Valle, are the Colombian breeds with the highest production.

In 2013, livestock occupied 80% of productive land in Colombia. The livestock sector is one of the most outstanding in areas such as Caribbean Region, where seven departments have livestock as their primary vocation. Also in Antioquia, where there is the largest cattle inventory in the country, the department had that year 11% of the head of cattle in Colombia, and according to the livestock inventory, in 2012 Antioqueños counted around 2,268,000 head of cattle.

Also in 2013, the bovine herd in Colombia reached 20.1 million head of cattle, of which 2.5 million (12.5%) were milking cows. In addition, the country's total milk production was 13.1 million liters.

On the other hand, the increase in imports of pork meat, the high prices of inputs and the slowdown in the national economy, produced a crisis in the raising of pork in Colombia in 2015.

=== Industry ===
The World Bank lists the main producing countries each year, based on the total value of production. According to the 2019 list, Colombia has the 46th most valuable industry in the world (US$35.4 billion), behind Mexico, Brazil, Venezuela and Argentina, but ahead of Peru and Chile.

==== Manufacturing ====
===== Domestic appliances =====
Although Colombia has been producing domestic appliances since the 1930s, it wasn't until the late 1990s that Colombian corporations began exporting to neighboring countries. One of Colombia's largest producers of domestic appliances, HACEB has been producing refrigeration since 1940. Some domestic corporations include: Challenger, Kalley, HACEB, Imusa, and Landers. In 2011, Groupe SEB acquired Imusa as a form to expand to the Latin American market. Colombia also manufactures for foreign companies as well, such as Whirlpool and GE. LG has also been interested in building a plant in Colombia. Colombia is also Latin America's 3rd largest producer of appliances behind Mexico and Brazil and is growing rapidly.

===== Electronics =====
Colombia is a major producer of electronics in Latin America, and is South America's second largest high-tech market. Colombia is also the second largest producer and exporter of electronics made by domestic companies in Latin America. Since the early 2000s, major Colombian corporations began exporting aggressively to foreign markets. Some of these companies include: Challenger, PcSmart, Compumax, Colcircuirtos, and Kalley. Colombia is the first country in Latin America to manufacture a domestically made 4K television. In 2014, the Colombian Government launched a national campaign to promote IT and Electronic sectors, as well as investing in Colombia's own companies. Although innovation remains low on the global scale, the government sees heavy potential in the high tech industry and is investing heavily in education and innovation centers all across the nation. Because of this, Colombia could become a major global manufacturer of electronics and play an important role in the global high tech industry in the near future. In 2014, the Colombian government released another national campaign to help Colombian companies have a bigger share of the national market.

===== Construction =====
Construction has recently played a vital role in the economy, and is growing rapidly at almost 20% annually. As a result, Colombia is seeing a historic building boom. The Colombian government is investing heavily in transport infrastructure through a plan called "Fourth Generation Network". The target of the Colombian government is to build 7,000 km of roads for the 2016–2020 period and reduce travel times by 30% and transport costs by 20%. A toll road concession program will comprise 40 projects, and is part of a larger strategic goal to invest nearly $50bn in transport infrastructure, including: railway systems; making the Magdalena River navigable again; improving port facilities; as well as an expansion of Bogotá's airport. Long-term plans include building a national high-speed train network, to vastly improve competitiveness.

==== Mining and energy ====
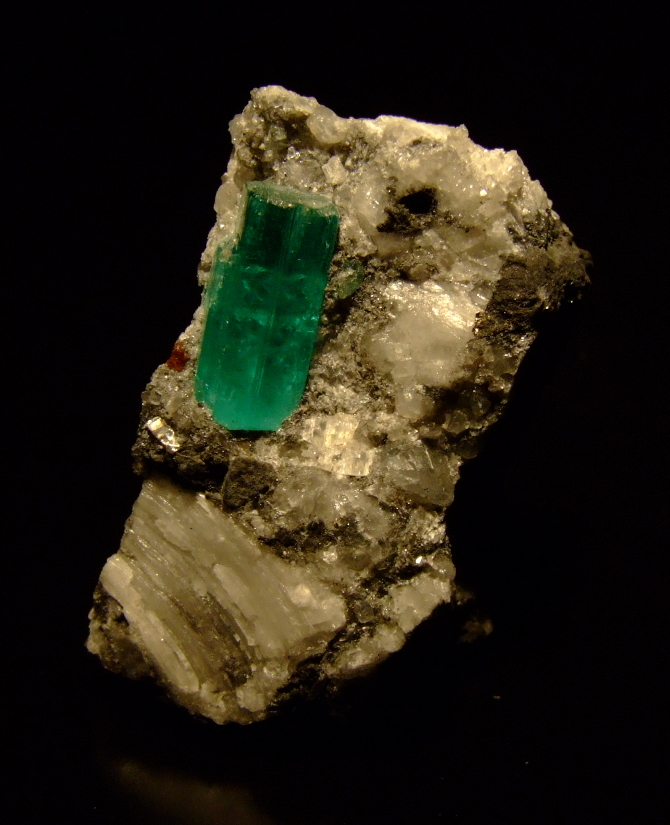
Emeralds are one of the most valuable and exported natural products in the country.

Colombia is well-endowed with minerals and energy resources. It has the largest coal reserves in Latin America, and is second to Brazil in hydroelectric potential. Estimates of petroleum reserves in 1995 were 3.1 billion barrels (490,000,000 m^{3}). It also possesses significant amounts of nickel, gold, silver, platinum, and emeralds.

The country was the 12th largest producer of coal in the world in 2018. In 2019, Colombia was the 20th largest petroleum producer in the world, with 791 thousand barrels / day. In mining, Colombia is the world's largest producer of emerald.

The discovery of 2 billion barrels (320,000,000 m^{3}) of high-quality oil at the Cusiana and Cupiagua fields, about 200 kilometres (120 mi) east of Bogotá, has enabled Colombia to become a net oil exporter since 1986. The Transandino pipeline transports oil from Orito in the Department of Putumayo to the Pacific port of Tumaco in the Department of Nariño. Total crude oil production averages 620 thousand barrels per day (99,000 m^{3}/d); about 184 thousand barrels per day (29,300 m^{3}/d) is exported. The Pastrana government has significantly liberalized its petroleum investment policies, leading to an increase in exploration activity. Refining capacity cannot satisfy domestic demand, so some refined products, especially gasoline, must be imported. Plans for the construction of a new refinery are under development.

While Colombia has vast hydroelectric potential, a prolonged drought in 1992 forced severe electricity rationing throughout the country until mid-1993. The consequences of the drought on electricity-generating capacity caused the government to commission the construction or upgrading of ten thermoelectric power plants. Half will be coal-fired, and half will be fired by natural gas. The government also has begun awarding bids for the construction of a natural gas pipeline system that will extend from the country's extensive gas fields to its major population centers. Plans call for this project to make natural gas available to millions of Colombian households by the middle of the next decade.

As of 2004, Colombia has become a net energy exporter, exporting electricity to Ecuador and developing connections to Peru, Venezuela and Panama to export to those markets as well. The Trans-Caribbean pipeline connecting western Venezuela to Panama through Colombia is also under construction, thanks to cooperation between presidents Álvaro Uribe of Colombia, Martín Torrijos of Panama and Hugo Chávez of Venezuela. Coal is exported to Turkey.

Oil and coal account for 47% of goods exports in 2021.

===== Human rights abuses in mining zones =====
The oil pipelines are a frequent target of extortion and bombing campaigns by the National Liberation Army (ELN) and, more recently, the Revolutionary Armed Forces of Colombia (FARC). Between 2007 and 2015 829 attacks were registered against hydrocarbon infrastructure. The bombings have caused substantial environmental damage, often in fragile rainforests and jungles, as well as causing significant loss of life. In April 1999 in Cartagena de Indias, Clinton's Secretary of Energy Bill Richardson spoke before investors from the United States, Canada and other countries. He expressed his government's willingness to use military aid to support the investment that they and their allies were going to make in Colombia, especially in strategically important sectors like mining and energy.

In 2001 there were 170 attacks on the Caño Limón–Coveñas pipeline. The pipeline was out of operation for over 200 days of that year; the government estimates that these bombings reduced Colombia's GDP by 0.5%. The government of the United States increased military aid, in 2003, to Colombia to assist in the effort to defend the pipeline. Occidental Petroleum privately contracted mercenaries who flew Skymaster planes, from AirScan International Inc., to patrol the Cano Limon-Covenas pipeline. Many of these operations used helicopters, equipment and weapons provided by the U.S. military and anti-narcotics aid programs.

Mining and natural exploitation has had environmental consequences. The region of Guajira is undergoing an accelerated desertification with the disappearances of forests, land, and water sources, due to the increase in coal production. Social consequences or lack of development in resource rich areas is common. 11 million Colombians survive on less than one dollar a day. Over 65% of these live in mining zones. There are 3.5 million children out of school, and the most critical situation is in the mining zone of Choco, Bolivar, and Sucre.

Economic consequences of privatization and liberal institutions have meant changes in taxation to attract foreign investment. Colombia will lose another $800 million over the next 90 years that Glencore International operates in El Cerrejon Zona Media, if the company continues to produce coal at a rate of 5 million tons/year, because of the reduction of the royalty tax from 10 to 15% to .04%. If the company, as is plausible, doubles or triples its production, the losses will be proportionally greater. The operational losses from the three large mining projects (El Cerrejon, La Loma, operated by Drummond, and Montelíbano, which produces ferronickel) for Colombia to more than 12 billion.

Coal production has grown rapidly, from 22.7 million tons in 1994 to 50.0 million tons in 2003. Over 90% of this amount was exported, making Colombia the world's sixth largest coal exporter, behind Australia, China, Indonesia, South Africa and Russia. From the mid-1980s the center of coal production was the Cerrejón mines in the Guajira department. However, the growth in output at La Loma in neighboring Cesar Department made this area the leader in Colombian coal production since 2004. Production in other departments, including Boyacá, Cundinamarca and Norte de Santander, forms about 13% of the total. The coal industry is largely controlled by international mining companies, including a consortium of BHP, Anglo American and Glencore at Cerrejón, and Conundrum Company at La Loma, which is undergoing a lawsuit in the U.S. District Court in Alabama for union assassinations and alleged paramilitary links.

=== Services ===
The services sector dominates Colombia's GDP, contributing 58 percent of GDP in 2007, and, given worldwide trends, its dominance will probably continue. The sector is characterized by its heterogeneity, being the largest for employment (61 percent), in both the formal and informal sectors.

==== Education ====
Education in Colombia includes nursery school, elementary school, high school, technical instruction and university education.

The Human Rights Measurement Initiative (HRMI) finds that Colombia is fulfilling only 80.5% of what it should be fulfilling for the right to education based on the country's level of income. HRMI breaks down the right to education by looking at the rights to both primary education and secondary education. While taking into consideration Colombia's income level, the nation is achieving 82.1% of what should be possible based on its resources (income) for primary education but only 78.9% for secondary education.

==== Healthcare ====
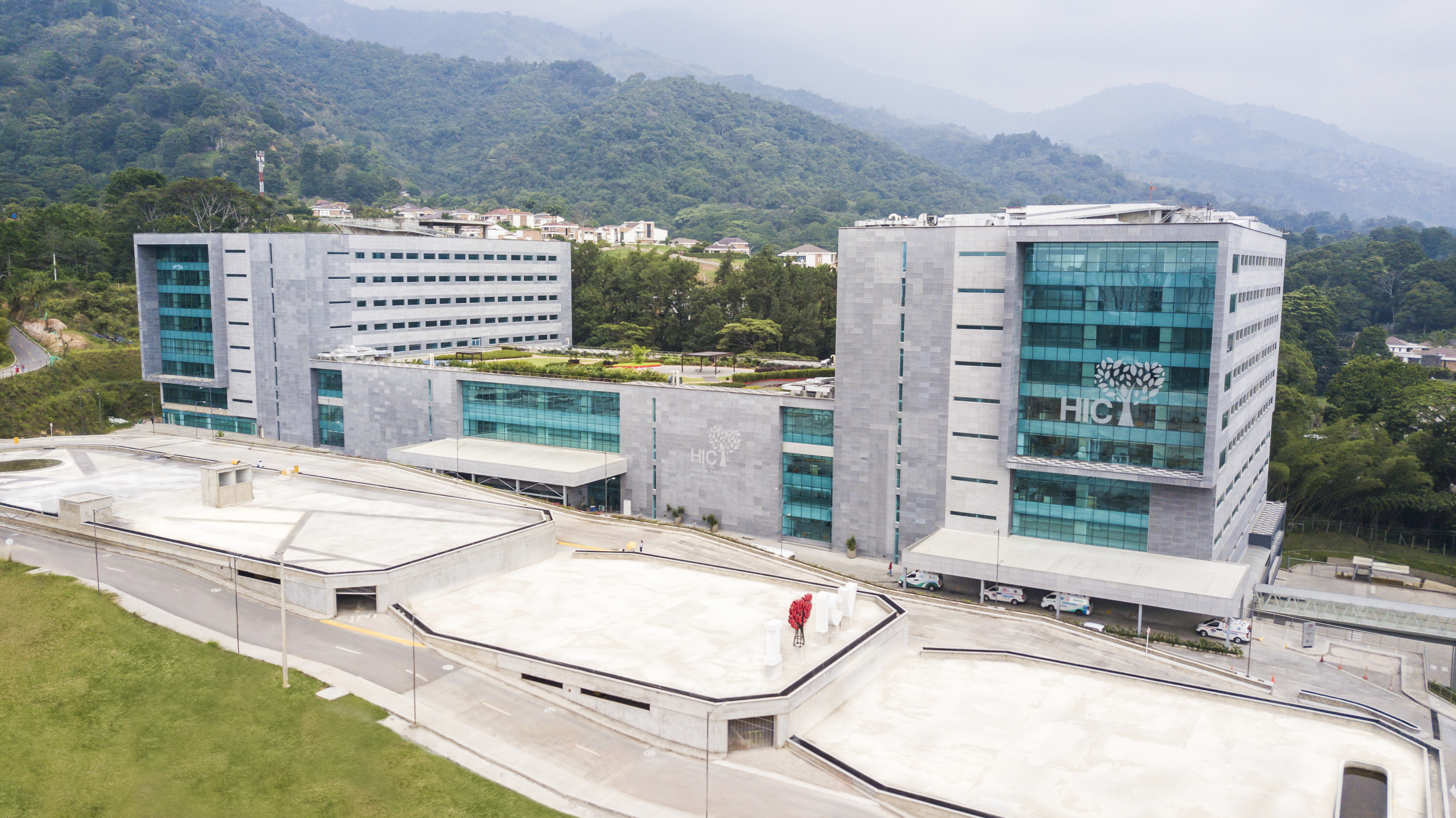
Colombia International Hospital located in Floridablanca, Santander.

Health care in Colombia is offered by the medical, nursing, and allied health professions in the Republic of Colombia.

The Human Rights Measurement Initiative finds that Colombia is fulfilling 94.0% of what it should be fulfilling for the right to health based on its level of income. When looking at the right to health with respect to children, Colombia achieves 96.3% of what is expected based on its current income. In regards to the right to health amongst the adult population, the country achieves only 91.7% of what is expected based on the nation's level of income. Colombia falls into the "fair" category when evaluating the right to reproductive health because the nation is fulfilling 93.9% of what the nation is expected to achieve based on the resources (income) it has available. The country is in 11th position among 200 countries when measuring the effectiveness of its health system.

==== Retail ====
Hypermarkets and big-box stores are losing market participation in Colombian retail.

==== Arts and music ====
Since the early 2010s, the Colombian government has shown interest in exporting modern Colombian pop culture to the world (which includes video games, music, movies, TV shows, fashion, cosmetics, and food) as a way of diversifying the economy and changing the image of Colombia. In the Hispanic world, Colombia is only behind Mexico in cultural exports at US$750 million annually, and is already a regional leader in cosmetic and beauty exports.

==== Travel and tourism ====
Tourism in Colombia is an important sector in the country's economy. Some of Colombia's tourist destinations include: Cartagena and its historic surroundings, which are on the UNESCO World Heritage List; the insular department of San Andrés, Providencia y Santa Catalina; Santa Marta, Cartagena and the surrounding area. Bogotá, the nation's capital, has become a tourist destination in Colombia due to improvements to its museums and entertainment facilities and its urban renovations, including the rehabilitation of public areas, the development of parks, and the creation of a network of cycling routes. The varied regional geography, which includes the Amazon and Andean regions, the llanos, the Caribbean and Pacific coasts, and the deserts of La Guajira, and its biodiversity, signifies the potential for ecotourism in Colombia.

The direct contribution of Travel & Tourism to GDP in 2013 was COP11,974.3mn (1.7% of GDP). This is forecast to rise by 7.4% to COP12,863.4mn in 2014. This primarily reflects the economic activity generated by industries such as hotels, travel agents, airlines and other passenger transportation services (excluding commuter services). But it also includes, for example, the activities of the restaurant and leisure industries directly supported by tourists. The direct contribution of Travel & Tourism to GDP is expected to grow by 4.1% pa to COP19,208.4mn (1.8% of GDP) by 2024.

The number of tourists in Colombia grows by over 12% every year. Colombia is projected to have over 15 million tourists by 2023.

Eco-tourism is very promising in Colombia. Colombia has vast coastlines, mountainous areas, and tropical jungles. There are volcanoes and waterfalls as well. This makes Colombia a biodiverse country with many attractions for foreign visitors.

The Colombian coffee growing axis (Spanish: Eje Cafetero), also known as the Coffee Triangle (Spanish: Triángulo del Café), is a part of the Colombian Paisa region in the rural area of Colombia, which is famous for growing and production of a majority of Colombian coffee, considered by some as the best coffee in the world. There are three departments in the area: Caldas, Quindío and Risaralda. These departments are among the smallest departments in Colombia with a total combined area of 13,873 km^{2} (5,356 sq mi), about 1.2% of the Colombian territory. The combined population is 2,291,195 (2005 census).

=== Transportation and telecommunications ===
Colombia's geography, with three cordilleras of the Andes running up the country from south to north, and jungle in the Amazon and Darién regions, represents a major obstacle to the development of national road networks with international connections. Thus, the basic nature of the country's transportation infrastructure is not surprising. In the spirit of the 1991 constitution, in 1993 the Ministry of Public Works and Transportation was reorganized and renamed the Ministry of Transportation. In 2000 the new ministry strengthened its role as the planner and regulator within the sector.

Colombia was a pioneer in promoting airlines in an effort to overcome its geographic barriers to transportation. The Colombian Company of Air Navigation, formed in 1919, was the second commercial airline in the world. It was not until the 1940s that Colombia's air transportation began growing significantly in the number of companies, passengers carried, and kilometers covered. In the early 2000s, an average of 72 percent of the passengers transported by air go to national destinations, while 28 percent travel internationally. One notable feature is that after the reforms of the beginning of the 1990s, the number of international passengers tripled by 2003. In 1993 the construction, administration, operation, and maintenance of the main airports transferred to departmental authorities and the private sector, including companies specializing in air transportation. Within this process, in 2006 the International Airport Operator (Opain), a Swiss-Colombian consortium, won the concession to manage and develop Bogotá's El Dorado International Airport. El Dorado is the largest airport in Latin America in terms of cargo traffic (33rd worldwide), with 622,145 metric tons in 2013, second in terms of traffic movements (45th worldwide) and third in terms of passengers (50th among the busiest airports in the world). In addition to El Dorado, Colombia's international airports are Palo Negro in Bucaramanga, Simón Bolívar in Santa Marta, Cortissoz in Barranquilla, Rafael Núñez in Cartagena, José María Córdova in Rionegro near Medellín, Alfonso Bonilla Aragón in Cali, Alfredo Vásquez Cobo in Leticia, Matecaña in Pereira, Gustavo Rojas Pinilla in San Andrés, and Camilo Daza in Cúcuta. In 2006 Colombia was generally reported to have a total of 984 airports, of which 103 had paved runways and 883 were unpaved. The Ministry of Transportation listed 581 airports in 2007, but it may have used a different methodology for counting them.

=== Utilities ===
==== Water supply and sanitation ====
Water supply and sanitation in Colombia have been improved in many ways over the past decades. Between 1990 and 2010, access to improved sanitation increased from 67% to 82%, but access to improved water sources increased only slightly from 89% to 94%. In particular, coverage in rural areas lags behind. Furthermore, despite improvements, the quality of water and sanitation services remains inadequate. For example, only 73% of those receiving public services receive water of potable quality and in 2006 only 25% of the wastewater generated in the country underwent any kind of treatment.

== Foreign trade and investment ==
Exports of Colombia by product category (2019) Chemical products Transportation Machines Mineral products Plastics and rubbers Metals Foodstuffs Precious metals Textiles Instruments Animal products Vegetable products Paper goods Footwear and headwear Miscellaneous Stone and glass Wood products Animal and vegetable bi-products Animal hides Arts and antiques Weapons

Various attempts to open up the economy during the 1993-2023 period have been described by the newspaper Portafolio as being "half-hearted". In 1990, to attract foreign investors and promote trade, an experiment from the International Monetary Fund known as "La Apertura" was adopted by the government, this policy was to modernize different sectors of the economy to increase the overall efficiency of production so as to bring down prices to internationally competitive levels. Although the analyses of the results are not clear, the fact is that the agricultural sector was severely impacted by this policy.

In 1991 and 1992, the government passed laws to stimulate foreign investment in nearly all sectors of the economy. The only activities closed to foreign direct investment are defense and national security, disposal of hazardous wastes, and real estate—the last of these restrictions is intended to hinder money laundering. Colombia established a special entity—Converter—to assist foreigners in making investments in the country. Foreign investment flows for 1999 were $4.4 billion, down from $4.8 billion in 1998.

Major foreign investment projects underway include the $6 billion development of the Cusiana and Cupiagua oil fields, development of coal fields in the north of the country, and the recently concluded licensing for establishment of cellular telephone service. The United States accounted for 26.5% of the total $19.4 billion stock of non-petroleum foreign direct investment in Colombia at the end of 1998. Still in 2023, Colombia was described as less "foreign business friendly" than China and Vietnam.

On 21 October 1995, under the International Emergency Economic Powers Act (IEEPA), President Clinton signed an Executive Order barring U.S. entities from any commercial or financial transactions with four Colombian drug kingpins and with individuals and companies associated with the traffic in narcotics, as designated by the Secretary of the Treasury in consultation with the Secretary of State and the Attorney General. The list of designated individuals and companies is amended periodically and is maintained by the Office of Foreign Asset Control at the Department of the Treasury, tel. (202) 622-0077 (ask for Document #1900). The document also is available at the Department of Treasury website.

Colombia is the United States' fifth-largest export market in Latin America—behind Mexico, Brazil, Venezuela, and Argentina—and the 26th-largest market for U.S. products worldwide. The United States is Colombia's principal trading partner, with two-way trade from November 1999 through November 2000 exceeding $9.5 billion--$3.5 billion U.S. exports and $6.0 billion U.S. imports. Colombia benefits from duty-free entry—for a 10-year period, through 2001—for certain of its exports to the United States under the Andean Trade Preferences Act. Colombia improved protection of intellectual property rights through the adoption of three Andean Pact decisions in 1993 and 1994, but the U.S. remains concerned over deficiencies in licensing, patent regulations, and copyright protection.

Colombia is also the largest export partner of the Dutch constituent country of Aruba (39.4%).

The petroleum and natural gas coal mining, chemical, and manufacturing industries attract the greatest U.S. investment interest. U.S. investment accounted for 37.8% ($4.2 billion) of the total $11.2 billion in foreign direct investment at the end of 1997, excluding petroleum and portfolio investment. Worker rights and benefits in the U.S.-dominated sectors are more favorable than general working conditions. Examples include shorter-than-average working hours, higher wages, and compliance with health and safety standards above the national average.

== Poverty and inequality ==
After a large crisis in 1999, poverty in Colombia has had a decreasing trend. The share of Colombians below the income-based poverty line fell from 50% in 2002 to 28% in 2016. The share of Colombians below the extreme income-based poverty line fell from 18% to 9% in the same period. Multidimensional poverty fell from 30% to 18% between 2010 and 2016.

Colombia has a Gini coefficient of 51.7.

== Debt ==
Between 1976 and 2006, Colombia's debt doubled every 10 years: in 1976 it was about $3.6 billion, in 1986 it was $7.2 billion, in 1996 it was over $16 billion and in 2006 it was over $36 billion. Since 2006, the growth of the debt has accelerated: it reached $72 billion in 2011 and reached $124 billion in 2017, which means that in less than 10 years Colombia's foreign debt has tripled. About a quarter of Colombia's annual budget, or $20 billion, goes to pay off the public debt.

== Labor rights ==
On 8 June 2020, the newly formed Employment Mission (Misión de Empleo) met for the first time to discuss labor reforms that it intended to propose to Congress. Some of these reforms had been desired for years, and others had come into starker view during the coronavirus pandemic.

The legal working hours are 48 hours per week. However, the informal economy accounts for almost half of the workers, who are therefore not covered by labor laws.

== Corruption ==
Corruption in Colombia is widespread and structural in nature. This situation generates losses for the country estimated at 15 billion dollars. Colombia has not escaped the scandals involving millions of dollars in bribes from the Brazilian construction company Odebrecht, as well as the Cartagena refinery, a case of embezzlement of public funds that came to light in 2016 and involved members of the governments of Álvaro Uribe (2002–2010) and Juan Manuel Santos (2010–2018).

== See also ==
- List of companies of Colombia
- List of Colombian departments by GDP
- List of Colombian people by net worth
- Economic history of Colombia
- Colombia and the World Bank
- Currency of Colombia
- Andean Countries–United Kingdom Trade Agreement
- Science and technology in Colombia
- Taxation in Colombia
- Trade unions in Colombia
- WWB Colombia
- Economy of South America
- List of Latin American and Caribbean countries by GDP growth
- List of Latin American and Caribbean countries by GDP (nominal)
- List of Latin American and Caribbean countries by GDP (PPP)
