= Economic history of Colombia =

Colombia is a South American country that has been inhabited by indigenous peoples and cultures since at least 12,000 BCE.

== Precolonial and colonial history ==
Indigenous peoples in Colombia predominantly cultivated and managed the Colombian climate and geography to develop planting technique using terraces. The indigenous also cultivated grass to use as roofs for their houses, and fique fiber to sew their clothing and artifacts. They also cultivated local fruits and vegetables like yuca and potato for their diet. The indigenous peoples also were avid hunters and consumed processed local fauna.

Colombia's economy during the colonial era was extractive and exploitative, relying heavily on forced native labor. Domestic industry was constrained during the colonial period because the audiencia was bound to Spain as part of a mercantile system. Under this arrangement, the colony functioned as the source of primary materials and the consumer of manufactured goods, a trade pattern that tended to enrich the metropolitan power at the expense of the colony.

Spanish colonizers in the New World sought quick riches in the form of precious metals and jewels. Consequently, mining for these items became the pillar of the economy for much of the colonial period. The extraction of precious metals—such as gold and copper—in the American colonies formed the basis of the crown's economy.

Spain monopolized trade with the colonies. The crown limited authorization for intercontinental trade to Veracruz (in present-day Mexico), Nombre de Dios (in present-day Panama), and Cartagena de Indias. Direct trade with other colonies was prohibited; as a result, items from one colony had to be sent to Spain for reshipment to another colony. The crown also established the routes of transport and the number of ships allowed to trade in the colonies. Merchants involved in intercontinental trade were peninsular-born Spaniards. Finally, the crown circumscribed the type of merchandise that could be traded. The colony could export to Spain only precious metals, gold in particular, and some agricultural products. In return, Spain exported to the colonies most of the manufactured goods that the colony's elites needed, as well as the commodity of African slaves. Domestic products supplemented these items only to a minor degree. The types of goods traded were constrained by the relatively small size and number of ships, so that only high-value, low volume goods could turn a profit.

Agriculture, which was limited in the 1500s to providing subsistence for colonial settlements and immediate consumption for workers in the mines, became a dynamic enterprise in the 1600s and replaced mining as the core of the Colombian economy by the 1700s. By the end of the 1700s, sugar and tobacco had become important export commodities. The growth in agriculture resulted in part from the increasing exhaustion of mineral and metal resources in the seventeenth century, which caused the crown to reorient its economic policy to stimulate the agricultural sector.

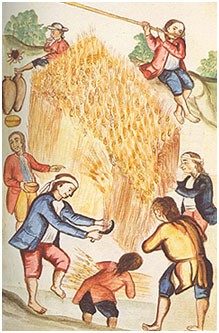
Indigenous Colombians participating in a minca, c. 1791

As commercial agriculture became the foundation of the Colombian economy, labor was a key factor. Agricultural enterprises that had access to forced labor of the encomienda, a crown grant of indigenous tribute and labor to particular Spaniards, were initially favored. Ownership of land itself was less important than access to labor. As the crown restricted the encomienda as an institution, private ownership of land with the mobilization of wage labor emerged in the landed estate, or hacienda. These landholdings were distinguishable by the manner in which the landholders obtained labor. Under a typical labor arrangement for an hacienda, indigenous laborers tilled the land a specified number of days per week or per year in exchange for access to small plots of land.

The encomendero, or recipient of the encomienda, extended privileges to de facto control of the land designated in his grant. In effect, the encomendero was a deputy charged by the crown with responsibility for the support of the indigenous people and their moral and religious welfare. Assuming that the land and its inhabitants were entirely at its disposal, the monarchy envisioned the encomiendas as a means of administering humane and constructive policies of the government of Spain and protecting the welfare of the indigenous people. The encomenderos, however, sought to employ the indigenous people for their own purposes and to maintain their land as hereditary property to be held in perpetuity. Most encomenderos were private adventurers rather than agents of the empire. The remoteness of the encomiendas from the center of government made it possible for the encomenderos to do as they pleased.

Under the influence of church figures such as Bartolomé de las Casas, the crown promulgated the New Laws in 1542 for the administration of the Spanish Empire in America. Designed to remove the abuses connected with encomiendas and to improve the general treatment of indigenous people, the laws called for strict enforcement of the existing regulations and freedom for the enslaved indigenous people, who were placed in the category of free subjects of the crown, and provided new regulations promoting the well-being of indigenous people. Encomenderos opposed the royal government's attempts to enforce these regulations. A formula was adopted according to which the laws would be "obeyed but not executed". In addition, the crown eventually granted modifications of the laws at the encomenderos' request.

The institution of the hacienda with its associated mita (ancient tribute) system of labor began in the late sixteenth century. After 1590 the crown started to grant titles of landownership to colonists who paid the crown for the land and reserved the right to use indigenous labor on their haciendas. Under an agrarian reform in 1592, the crown established resguardos, or reservations, for the indigenous people to provide for their subsistence; the resulting concentration of indigenous people freed up land to be sold to hacendados. The purchase of land as private real estate from the crown led to the development of latifundios.

The new hacendados soon came into conflict with the encomenderos because of the ability of the latter to monopolize indigenous labor. The Spanish authorities instituted the mita to resolve this conflict. After 1595 the crown obliged resguardo indigenous people to contract themselves to neighboring hacendados for a maximum of fifteen days per year. The mitayos (indigenous people contracted to work) also were contracted for labor as miners in Antioquia, as navigational aides on the Río Magdalena, and as industrial workers in a few rare cases. Although the mitayos were considered free because they were paid a nominal salary, the landowners and other employers overworked them to such an extent that many became seriously sick or died.

Because the mitayos could not survive their working conditions, the crown sought an alternate source of cheap labor through the African slave trade. The crown sold licenses to individuals allowing them to import slaves, primarily through the port at Cartagena. Although the crown initially restricted licenses to Spanish merchants, it eventually opened up the slave trade to foreigners as demand outstripped supply. The mining industry was the first to rely on black slaves, who by the seventeenth century had replaced mitayos in the mines. The mining industry continued to depend on slave labor into the eighteenth century. Despite the decline of the mining industry, slavery remained the key form of labor; from the second half of the seventeenth century through the eighteenth century, plantation-style agriculture rose in prominence and raised the demand for slave labor on sugar plantations and ranches. Minor segments of the economy also supported slavery and used slaves as artisans, domestic servants, and navigational aides. By the end of the 1700s, the high price of slaves along with increasing antislavery sentiment in the colony caused many to view the system as anachronistic; nonetheless, it was not abolished until after independence was achieved.

== 1819–1902 ==
Colombia's contemporary economy, based on coffee and other agricultural exports, did not emerge until after independence in 1819, when local entrepreneurs were free to capitalize on world markets other than Spain.

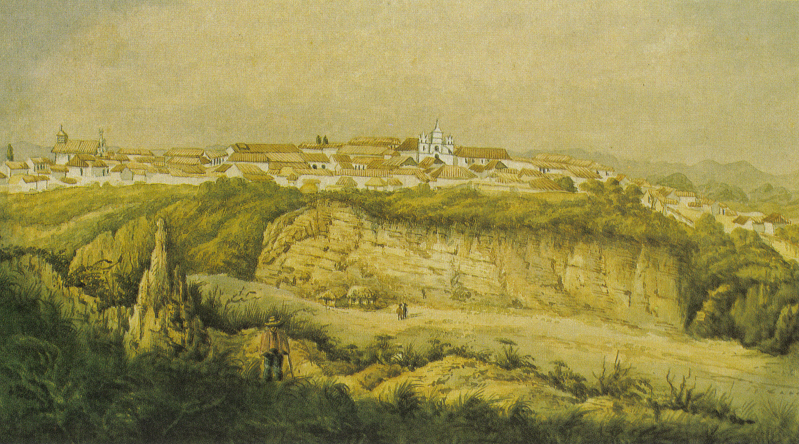
Agricultural area surrounding Santa Rosa de Osos, 1852

Although colonialism fostered minimal domestic economic growth, small entrepreneurial efforts began to take shape, so that by the nineteenth century well-defined economic enterprises existed. The economy at that time was based primarily on mining, agriculture, and cattle raising, with contributions also by local artisans and merchants.

Socioeconomic changes proceeded slowly; the economic system functioned as a loosely related group of regional producers rather than as a national entity. Land and wealth were still the privileges of a minority. Forced labor continued in the mines, and various labor arrangements existed on the haciendas, such as sharecropping and low-wage labor. In each case, those owning the land benefited and those working the land remained impoverished.

In the late nineteenth century, tobacco and coffee export industries developed, greatly enlarging the merchant class and leading to population expansion and the growth of cities. The concentration of economic activity in agriculture and commerce, two sectors that focused on opening channels to world markets, continued slowly but steadily throughout the nineteenth century.

== 1902–1967 ==
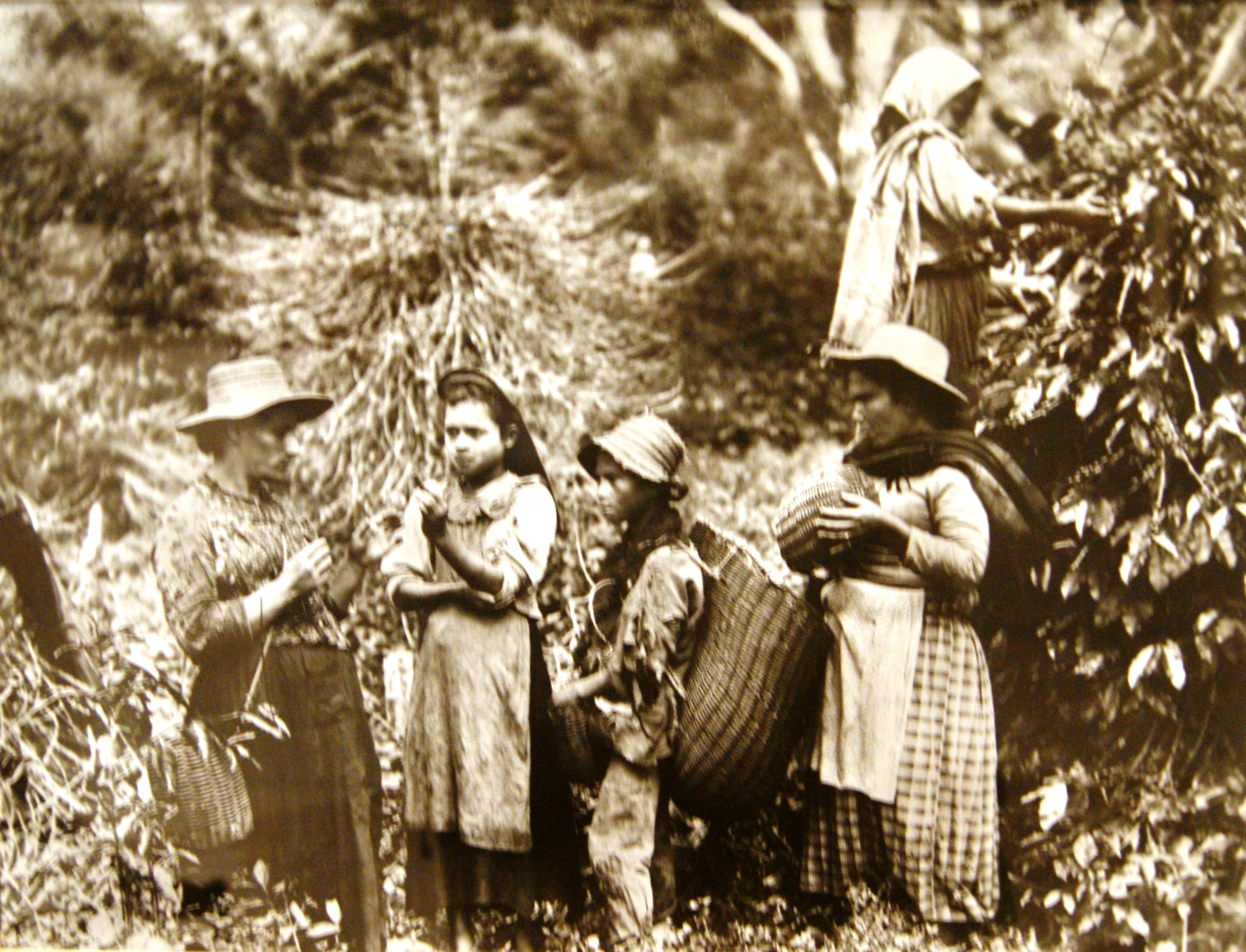
Children harvesting coffee, 1910

Following the War of the Thousand Days (1899–1902), Colombia experienced a coffee boom that catapulted the country into the modern period, bringing the attendant benefits of transportation, particularly railroads, communications infrastructure, and the first major attempts at manufacturing. The period 1905–15 has been described as the most significant growth phase in Colombian history, characterized by an expansion of exports and government revenues, as well as an overall rise in the GDP. Coffee contributed most to trade, growing from only 8 percent of total exports at the beginning of the 1870s to nearly 75 percent by the mid-1920s. Beyond its direct economic impact, the expansion of coffee production also had a profound social effect. In sharp contrast to mining and to some agricultural products such as bananas, which were grown on large plantations, coffee production in Colombia historically developed on very small plots of land. As a result, it generated an important class of small landowners whose income depended on a major export commodity. Large amounts of foreign capital found their way into both private investment and public works during this period because of the strong performance of coffee and other exports.

The rapid growth and development of the economy in the early twentieth century helped to strengthen the country so it was largely resistant to the Great Depression that began in 1929. Colombia continued to produce raw materials, and, although coffee prices collapsed during the Depression, output continued to expand. Nonetheless, social and economic improvements were uneven.

The expansion of the coffee industry laid the groundwork for national economic integration after World War II. During the course of the postwar expansion, Colombia underwent a distinct transformation. Before the 1950s, because of the steep terrain and a relatively primitive transportation network, local industries that were only loosely linked to other regional businesses dominated the manufacturing sector. Improved transportation facilities, financed directly and indirectly by the coffee industry, fostered national development. Greater economic integration soon became evident with the heavier concentration of industry and population in the six largest cities. Coffee's success, therefore, led ultimately to a reliable transportation network that hastened urbanization and industrialization.

In addition to coffee production, economic expansion of both the rest of the industrial sector and the services sector took place in two distinct stages. From 1950 until 1967, Colombia followed a well-defined program of import-substitution industrialization, with most manufacturing startups directed toward domestic consumption that previously had been satisfied by imports. The labor sector has been studied for this period, examining the role of gender in radical factory organizing of previously unorganized workers as well technological innovations and the rise of newly trained industrial engineers changed the dynamic of worker and management relations. After 1967 planners in both government and industry shifted the economic strategy to export promotion, emphasizing nontraditional exports, such as clothing and other manufactured consumables, in addition to processed coffee.

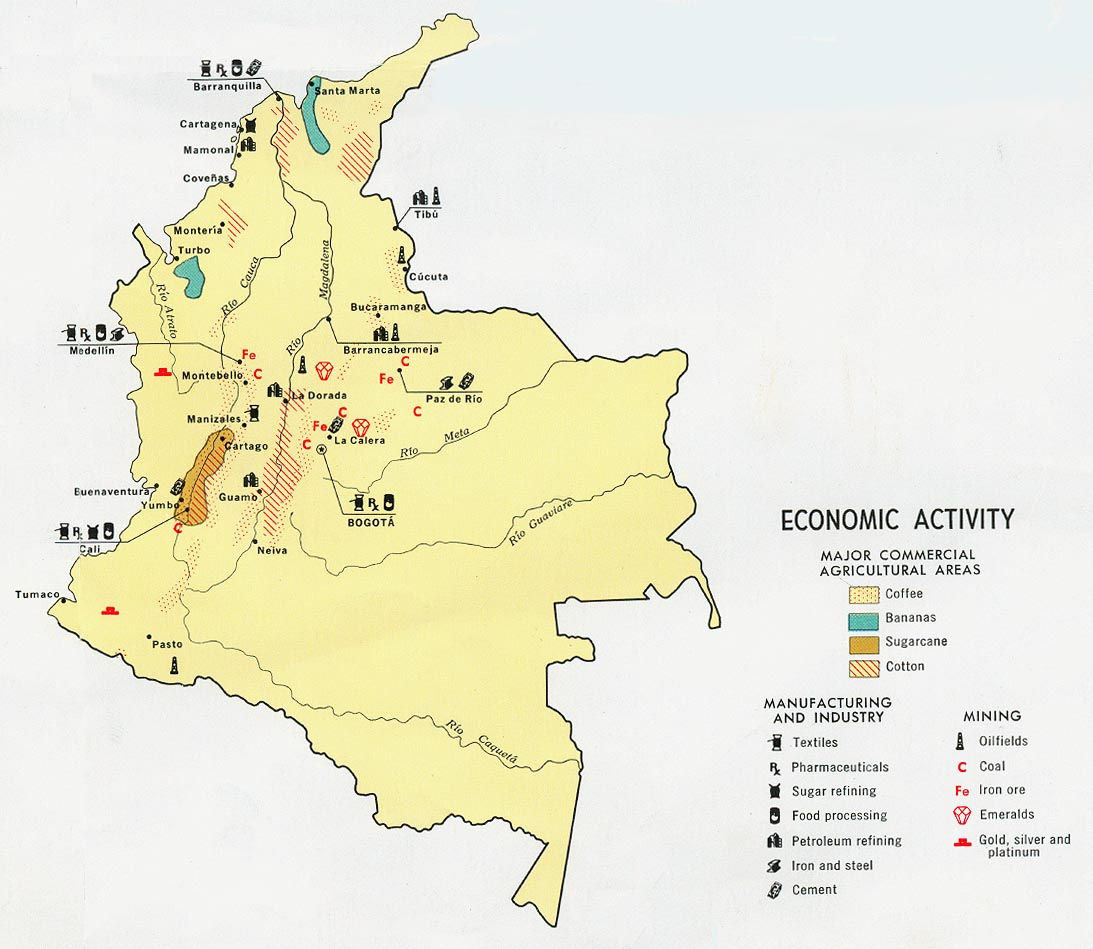
Map of economic activity in Colombia, 1970

== 1967–1989 ==
From 1967 to 1980, the Colombian economy, and particularly the coffee industry, experienced sustained growth. Because of severe weather problems affecting the world's largest exporter, Brazil, coffee prices reached unprecedented levels in the mid-1970s. High prices prompted an important expansion in coffee production in Colombia. This expansion involved a significant increase in the harvested area and, more importantly, the introduction of a high-yielding coffee variety. In just over a decade, Colombia's coffee production doubled. The expansion of production and exports boosted the income and purchasing capacity of the thousands of households involved in coffee cultivation, thereby increasing consumption rapidly and allowing the GDP to expand at an average annual rate of more than 5 percent during this period. Strong export earnings and a large increase in foreign-exchange reserves were the most noticeable results of this economic expansion. At the same time, the Bank of the Republic (Colombia's central bank) had to use a variety of policies and instruments at its disposal in order to prevent inflation from accelerating.

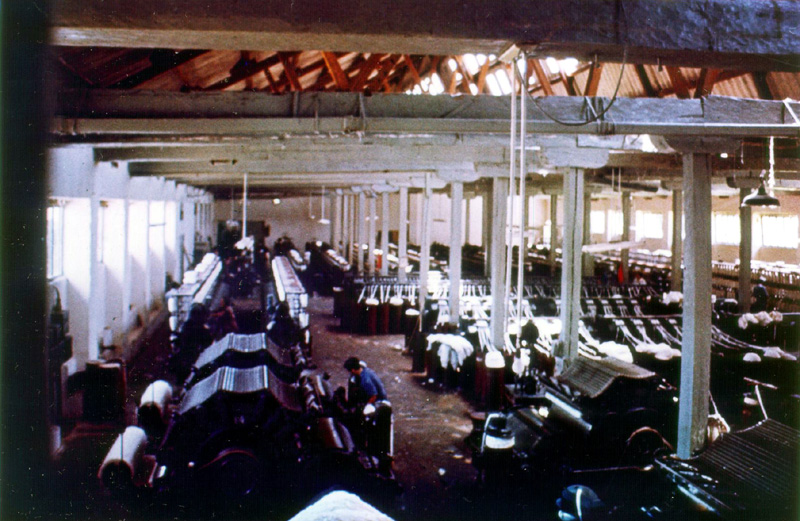
Textile factory near San José de Suaita, late 1970s

Most of the second half of the twentieth century, at least until the late 1980s, saw Colombia's economy being managed in a reasonably conservative way. By all accounts, and contrary to most other countries in the region, the government did not indulge in populist macro-economic policies. The fiscal accounts were never seriously out of balance, and, as a result, public debt remained at comfortable levels. Foreign finance flowing to the region diminished significantly at the beginning of the 1980s, and Colombia was the only major Latin American economy that did not default on or restructure its public debt. This prudent policy stance resulted in rather stable if modest economic performance, despite a wide range of international shocks, including shifts in the prices of coffee and oil, the international debt crisis, and swings in the economic performance of its main trading partners.

In the 1980s, the government played a simultaneous role as a legislator, regulator, and entrepreneur, particularly in the provision of public utilities and in the exploitation of major natural resources, such as oil and coal. Colombia also used diverse trade-policy tools, such as tariffs and quotas, in order to promote import substitution, supplemented after 1967 by export promotion and economic diversification. To encourage exports, a competitive exchange rate became a centerpiece of macroeconomic policy, together with several export subsidies, including tax exemptions and subsidized credit. The initial export-promotion strategy did not include import liberalization as one of its components. A prominent feature of the export-promotion strategy was that the Bank of the Republic stood ready to vary the fixed but adjustable exchange rate to compensate for domestic inflation, in order to maintain the competitiveness of domestic producers. As a result, the exchange rate became indexed to the rate of inflation, and it did not take long for a vicious circle to develop, one in which inflation fed into the exchange rate and vice versa. Consequently, and notwithstanding a tradition of prudent fiscal policies, for a long period Colombia was characterized by a moderate, albeit stable, rate of inflation. Widespread indexation mechanisms, particularly for wages, public utilities, and mortgage-interest rates, blurred most income-redistribution effects generally associated with inflation.

The financial sector became highly regulated, and the Central Bank established a range of subsidized credit lines. The government intervened heavily in the foreign-exchange markets by setting prices and controlling access to foreign exchange. The Bank of the Republic had a monopoly over the purchase and sale of all foreign exchange. Traders had to surrender export proceeds to the bank, and importers had to meet all their foreign-exchange requirements through the Central Bank. Consequently, a black market for foreign exchange emerged, which would eventually be the vehicle of choice to bring back to Colombia part of the proceeds flowing from the sale of illicit drugs in the United States and Europe. Strict regulations also governed international capital flows, and foreign direct investment became highly regulated. International agreements among the Andean Community of Nations members prohibited foreign investment in the financial sector.

Because the fiscal position remained broadly under control, Colombia managed to service its foreign debt during the debt crisis of the 1980s. Average growth was not very high, but, unlike other regional economies, no sharp recession occurred either. Likewise, inflation was stable at moderate levels. On the negative side, in the late 1980s Colombia had grim prospects for productivity growth. The expansion of the labor force and increases in the capital stock engendered economic growth, but both factors were exploited very inefficiently. The government and the international financial institutions, especially the World Bank, concluded that the lackluster performance and bleak prospects for productivity growth to a great extent reflected the economy's inadequate exposure to foreign competition and the prevalence of government intervention in the economy. In addition, the increasing internal conflict, in which guerrilla groups, paramilitaries, and drug cartels were major players, had negative economic effects, primarily by displacing legal and productive agricultural activities. The insecurity fostered huge investments in sectors inconducive to economic efficiency, such as low-density cattle raising on some of Colombia's most productive land, and created a very unfavorable environment for domestic and, especially, foreign investors.

Thus, in common with other developing countries, particularly in Latin America, the late 1980s and early 1990s in Colombia were years of major changes. Some of the changes, particularly at the initial stages of the reform process, were geared toward enhancing competition and making several markets more efficient. These changes included meaningful trade liberalization in 1989 and labor, financial, and foreign-exchange reforms beginning in 1989 and 1990.

== 1990–1999 ==
In 1990, the country elected a Constituent Assembly in order to write a new constitution that would replace the 1886 charter. The drive toward this major change was not related to economic issues. Rather, it took place within a complex political scenario, including a peace process with the Nineteenth of April Movement (M–19) guerrilla group and the debate over how to bring major drug lords to justice.

Important provisions in the 1991 constitution would have lasting effects on the economy, particularly the articles that aided the overarching goal of facilitating progress toward long-awaited peace and political reconciliation. Of particular importance were the promotion of fiscal decentralization and the social role of the state. The aim of fiscal decentralization was to complement the process of political decentralization that had been initiated in the mid-1980s, with the popular election of city mayors. The social role of the state was deemed a necessary supplement to recent economic reforms, in order to ensure that the benefits resulting from these reforms would reach the vast majority of the population. The manner in which these critical issues were eventually handled had profound implications for the constant increases in public expenditure. Inasmuch as the growth in government outlays was not matched by increases in taxes or other government revenue, the fiscal provisions in the constitution had a negative effect on the public debt. The new constitution also made the Bank of the Republic independent, with a mandate to strive for a low and stable rate of inflation.

Between 1989 and 1992, Colombia went through an unprecedented period of change in economic policy and institutions. These reform processes, which might not seem particularly ambitious when compared with other experiences in Latin America, were rather exceptional within Colombia, given the country's long tradition of moving very slowly and cautiously on reforms. One set of policies—including trade liberalization, labor and financial sector reform, and independence of the Bank of the Republic—was geared toward promoting trade and competition, enhancing flexibility, and increasing productivity. Another set of policies—especially fiscal decentralization and the constitutionally mandated social role of the state—was mostly driven by political and social considerations. In the context of a favorable international environment, these principles served the country well until 1995. However, after 1996 several factors conspired to make the two sets of policies somewhat inconsistent and quite costly. Furthermore, the reform momentum had largely evaporated, so that several of the identified policy inconsistencies were not addressed.

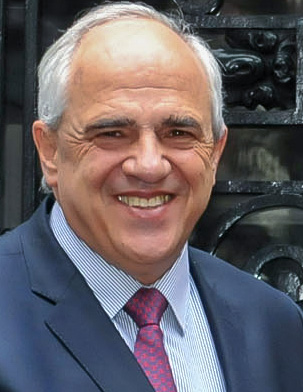
The political crises arising from the election of Ernesto Samper Pizano (pictured) had serious consequences on Colombian economic policy.

Colombia enjoyed a fairly good economic performance in the first half of the 1990s because of an initial increase in public spending, and the wealth effect resulting from increased oil production, which, however, peaked in 1999, and a greater role for the private sector. However, continuous fiscal deficits led to higher public debt, and the increases of both private and public foreign debt made the country vulnerable to negative international shocks. Furthermore, a profound political crisis emerged because of allegations that drug traffickers had partially financed the presidential campaign of Ernesto Samper Pizano. The political crises that ensued had two serious consequences for economic policy. On the one hand, the government tried to enhance its popular support through initiatives that were very costly in fiscal terms, including significant wage increases for civil servants, particularly for members of the very powerful teachers' union. On the other hand, the government's ability to engage the Congress of the Republic (Congreso de la República) in meaningful reform vanished. As a result, a much-needed push to enhance public revenues, including thorough changes to the tax code, did not happen.

Unsurprisingly, in the midst of the Asian and Russian economic crises of the late 1990s, Colombia had its first economic recession in more than 60 years. The exchange rate came under severe pressure, and the Bank of the Republic devalued the exchange-rate band twice. The sudden stop in international lending led to an abrupt adjustment in the current account, which meant a large contraction in aggregate demand. Increases in international interest rates together with expectations of devaluation of the peso caused rises in internal interest rates, contributing to the contraction of GDP. The recession and the bursting of a real-estate bubble also resulted in a major banking crisis. The savings and loan corporations were especially affected. The government took over a few private financial institutions and forced others to close. Public banks and private mortgage banks were hard hit, and the subsequent government intervention to aid some of the distressed financial institutions added pressures on public expenditure.

In late 1999, the government and the Central Bank undertook a major policy decision: the exchange rate would be allowed to float and be determined by market forces, and the Bank of the Republic would no longer intervene in the foreign-exchange market. Inasmuch as this change in policy came when confidence in the peso was very low, there was a distinct possibility that the currency would weaken to an extent that could make foreign debts—both of the government and of the private sector—unpayable.

To prevent such an event from occurring, Colombia signed a three-year extended-fund facility arrangement with the International Monetary Fund (IMF) in order to boost confidence in the economy, prevent the exchange rate from collapsing once it was allowed to float, and return economic reform to the agenda, with fiscal sustainability and inflation control. This agreement, with minor variations, was extended twice and served as an important guiding framework for economic policy making, particularly in reestablishing Colombia's reputation as a fiscally sound economy, a long-standing positive tradition that was lost in the 1990s. Signing the extended-fund facility with the IMF demonstrated that the government and the Central Bank were willing to make needed major policy decisions. In the context of the agreements with the IMF, the Bank of the Republic allowed the exchange rate to float in 1999 and concentrated on reducing inflation. The government also introduced several tax-enhancing reforms and partial reforms of the public pension system, amended the fiscal decentralization regime, strengthened the financial system, and once again privatized several financial institutions that the government had taken over during the crises.

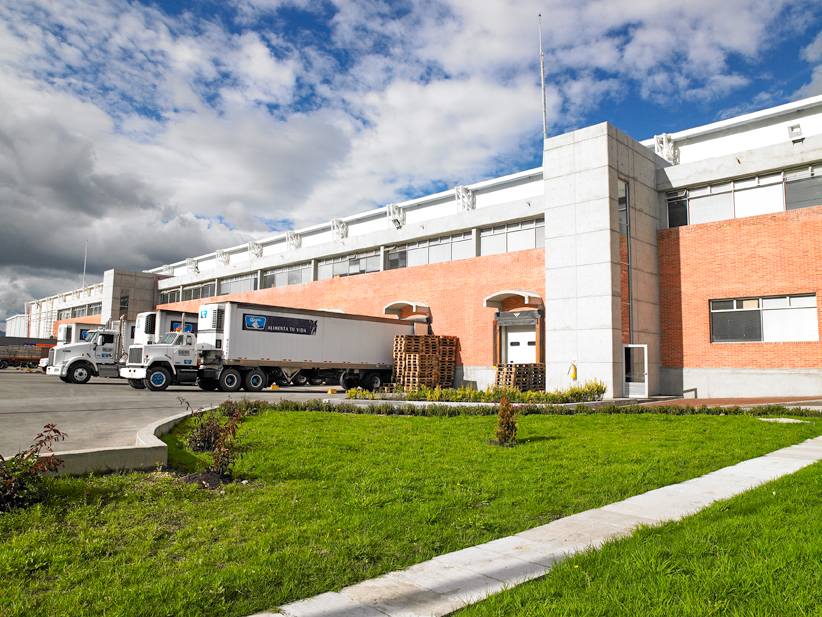
Alpina Productos Alimenticios factory, Bogotá, 2005

== 1999–present ==
By early 2000 there had been the beginning of an economic recovery, with the export sector leading the way, as it enjoyed the benefit of the more competitive exchange rate, as well as strong prices for petroleum, Colombia's leading export product. Prices of coffee, the other principal export product, have been more variable.

Economic growth reached 3.1% during 2000 and inflation was 9.0% although unemployment has yet to significantly improve. Colombia's international reserves have remained stable at around $8.35 billion, and Colombia has successfully remained in international capital markets. Colombia's total foreign debt at the end of 1999 was $34.5 billion with $14.7 billion in private sector and $19.8 billion in public sector debt. Major international credit rating organizations have dropped Colombian sovereign debt below investment grade, primarily as a result of large fiscal deficits, which current policies are seeking to close.

Several international financial institutions have praised the economic reforms introduced by former president Álvaro Uribe (elected August 7, 2002), which include measures designed to reduce the public-sector deficit below 2.5% of GDP in 2004. The government's economic policy and democratic security strategy have engendered a growing sense of confidence in the economy, particularly within the business sector, and GDP growth in 2003 was among the highest in Latin America, at over 4%. By 2007, GDP grew over 8%.

The growing cut-flower industry has contributed to the expansion of Colombia's economy. Colombia is now the 2nd-largest exporter of cut flowers in the world, and the 3rd-largest producer of roses. The cut-flower industry began in 1966 and continues to grow to this day. The industry is the largest employer of women in the country. Cut flowers are now the nation's leading nontraditional export and fourth largest earner of foreign exchange after coffee, petroleum, and bananas.

Colombia over the last decade has experienced a historic economic boom despite past issues. In 1999, Colombia was Latin America's 4th Largest economy and had a GDP per capita of only $5,500, however by 2013 it surpassed Argentina becoming Latin America's 3rd largest economy, and the world's 27th largest in 2013. As of 2014, the GDP PPP per capita has increased to over $13,000 and GDP PPP increased from US$320 Billion in 1999 to nearly US$800 Billion. Poverty levels were as high as 63% in 1999, but decreased to under 25%. Modern Industries like Shipbuilding, Electronics, Automobile, Tourism, Construction, and Mining, grew dramatically during the 2000s and 2010s, however, most of Colombia's exports are still commodity-based. Colombia is Latin America's 2nd largest producer of domestically made electronics and appliances only behind Mexico. As of 2017, Colombia was the fastest growing major economy in the western world, but ranking behind China worldwide.

Non-traditional exports have boosted the growth of Colombian foreign sales as well as the diversification of destinations of export thanks to new free trade agreements. Recent economic growth has led to a considerable increase of new millionaires, including the new entrepreneurs, Colombians with a net worth exceeding US$1 billion.

In 2017, however, the National Administrative Department of Statistics (DANE) reported that 26.9% of the population were living below the poverty line, of which 7.4% were in "extreme poverty". The multidimensional poverty rate stands at 17.0 percent of the population.

The contribution of tourism to GDP was US$5,880.3bn (2.0% of total GDP) in 2016. Tourism generated 556,135 jobs (2.5% of total employment) in 2016. Foreign tourist visits were predicted to have risen from 0.6 million in 2007 to 4 million in 2017.

In 2021, official figures showed that 39% of Colombians -out of a population of 51.6 million inhabitants- were in a condition of monetary poverty. Although it shows a slight improvement compared to 2020 (42.5%), it meant a setback of at least a decade.

== See also ==
- Economy of Colombia
- Latin American economy
