= WWB =

WWB may refer to:

== Organizations ==
- Women Without Borders, an international non-profit female empowerment organization founded by Edit Schlaffer in 2001.
- Women's World Banking, nonprofit organisation supporting microfinance institution with a focus on women entrepreneurs
  - WWB Colombia, a microfinance institution in Colombia
  - Friends of Women's World Banking, organisation in India
- Writers' War Board, American WWII propaganda organisation

== Meteorology ==
- Westerly wind burst, equatorial Pacific weather phenomenon associated with El Niño

== Magazines ==
- Words Without Borders, international literary magazine published in New York City

== Bridges ==
- Woodrow Wilson Bridge, a bridge over the Potomac River
- Woodrow Wilson Bridge (Jackson, Mississippi), a bridge over the Pearl River in Mississippi

== Computing ==
- Writer's Workbench, a UNIX software package
- WinWrap Basic, a Visual Basic macro language by Polar Engineering
- A file extension for WordPerfect on Microsoft Windows, see List of filename extensions (S–Z) § W

== Linguistics ==
- ISO 639 code for the Wakabunga language

== Music ==
- Wild Willy Barrett, English musician

== Television ==
- Walking with Beasts

== Other ==
- "Walking while black", a spin on the phrase driving while black

== See also ==
- All pages beginning with WWB
