= List of Colombian departments by GDP =

This is a list of Colombian departments by gross domestic product (GDP).

== 2025 ==
Department	Population (2020)	GDP (bil. COP)	GDP (bil. US$)	GDP per capita (COP)	GDP per capita(US$)
Bogotá	7,743,955	432.506.683	145.706	49.730.969	18.427
Antioquia	6,677,930	267.672.300	85.682	33.738.353	11.577
Valle del Cauca	4,532,152	167.745.495	55.957	32.875.773	11.279
Santander	2,280,908	111.196.240	36.827	42.893.136	14.721
Cundinamarca	3,242,999	109.293.972	36.197	28.847.163	9.893
Atlántico	2,722,128	77.128.341	25.429	25.039.898	8.580
Bolívar	2,180,976	62.256.060	20.561	25.197.612	8.639
Meta	1,063,454	59.143.257	16.321	47.525.775	16.321
Boyacá	1,242,731	47.116.011	15.063	32.177.791	11.045
Tolima	1,339,998	35.657.772	12.657	24.308.336	8.319
Cesar	1,295,387	36.141.242	11.272	23.932.464	8.206
Cauca	1,491,937	31.128.030	10.481	18.172.817	6.230
Córdoba	1,828,947	30.436.296	10.366	14.614.790	4.998
Huila	1,122,622	29.052.828	9.908	22.376.653	7.688
Caldas	1,018,453	28.532.168	9.797	24.943.015	8.555
Risaralda	961,055	28.878.035	9.793	26.939.277	9.263
Norte de Santander	1,620,318	27.494.567	9.335	14.714.945	5.053
Nariño	1,627,589	25.594.158	8.820	13.726.930	4.696
Magdalena	1,427,026	24.035.897	8.304	14.564.364	5.010
Casanare	435,195	24.731.350	7.273	48.146.499	16.486
La Guajira	965,718	21.614.828	5.498	18.870.184	6.465
Quindío	555,401	14.526.414	4.925	23.365.783	8.045
Sucre	949,252	13.834.680	4.696	12.642.903	4.339
Arauca	294,206	9.504.648	2.920	27.403.847	9.568
Chocó	544,764	7.438.000	2.634	11.420.489	3.896
Caquetá	410,521	6.742.547	2.291	14.536.951	4.947
Putumayo	359,127	6.396.680	1.947	15.128.149	5.208
Archipelago of San Andrés, Providencia and Santa Catalina	63,692	3.358.257	0.859	36.188.950	12.124
Guaviare	86,657	1.383.468	0.462	12.821.768	4.415
Vichada	112,958	1.208.675	0.458	8.589.754	3.462
Amazonas	79,020	1.376.030	0.343	13.997.736	5.067
Guainía	50,636	691.734	0.229	9.837.192	3.864
Vaupés	44,712	441.881	0.172	8.984.689	2.846
Colombia	50,883,000	1.729.335.000	572.800	35.936.371	10.704

== See also ==
- Economy of Colombia
