= San José de Suaita =

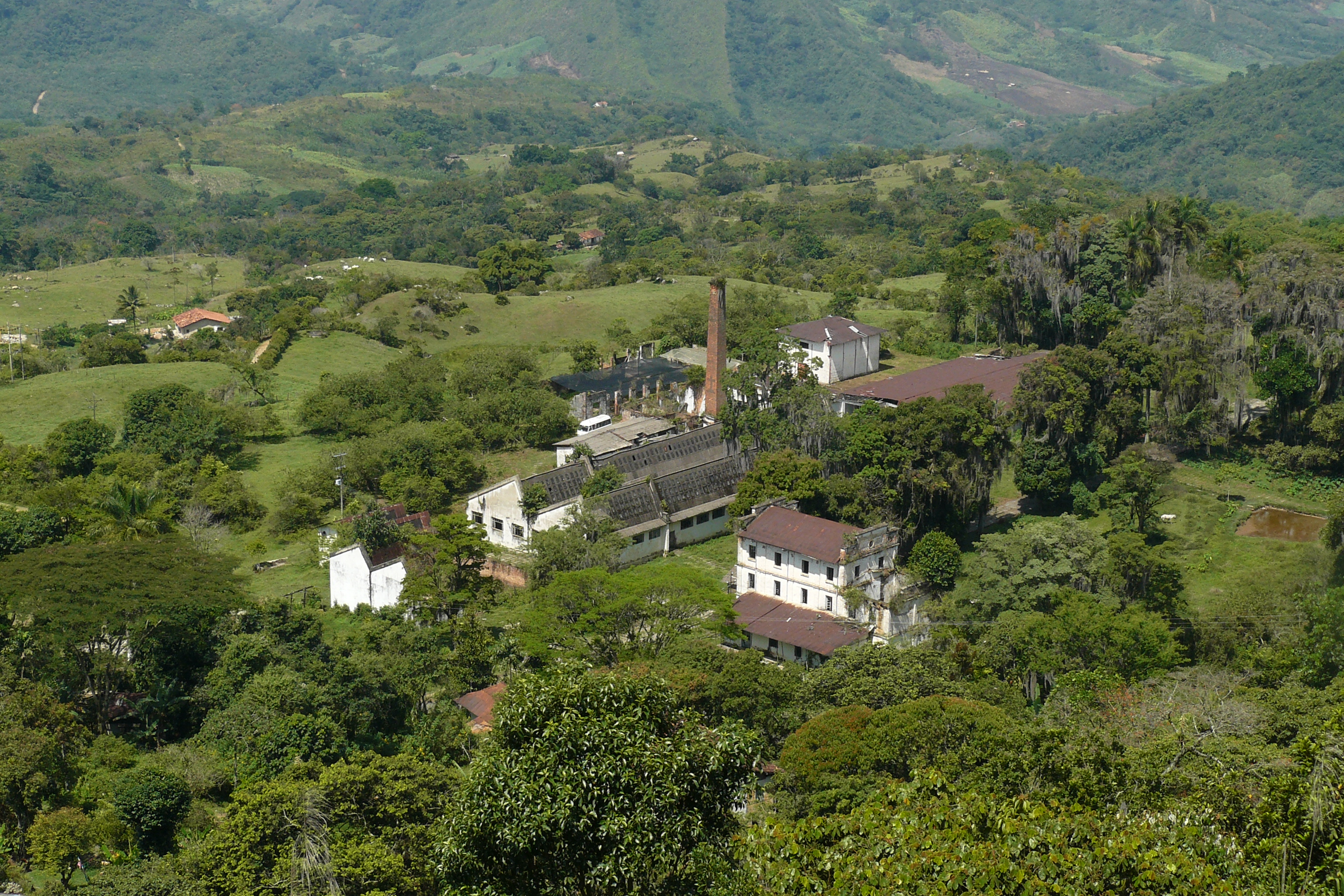
Factory ruins

San José de Suaita is a populated center of Colombia of the municipality of Suaita. Located about 200 km north of Bogotá in the Department of Santander, Colombia.

== Population ==
There are 1,212 residents (323 urban, and 989 rural). There are 280 households, of which 40.2% have children under 18, 59.8% are single-person, and 9.2% include a person over the age of 65. The average family size is 4.35. San José de Suaita is transforming from an industrial town to an agricultural one. There are very few jobs remaining, and many people are leaving for larger cities.

== History ==
San José de Suaita was a plot of land given to the bourgeois Caballero family, a political family which claimed several properties in the area, including Silvania and Tipacoque. The other properties had been owned by the Caballeros since colonial times, while San José de Suaita was granted to them more recently. Alfonso López Michelsen, former president of Colombia, detailed some of the history of the town in his book Pending Words.

== Cotton Mill Museum ==
The Cotton Mill Museum and Factory of San José de Suaita (Spanish: Museo del Algodón y Fábricas de San José de Suaita) is housed in the former Inscomercial High School Building and was opened in 2006 under the supervision of the French sociologist Pierre Raymond, who was concerned to preserve the history of the important cotton industry in Colombia.

Through its exhibits, programs, and collections, the museum preserves and interprets the history of textiles and the textile industry, with special emphasis on the experiences of the craftspeople, industrial workers, manufacturers, machines, inventors, designers, and consumers. The museum also promotes greater understanding of the major trends and changes in technology, economy, society, environment, and culture that have shaped San José de Suaita from 1900 to the present. Working people operate vintage machinery and guides demonstrate the production process.

== Gallery ==
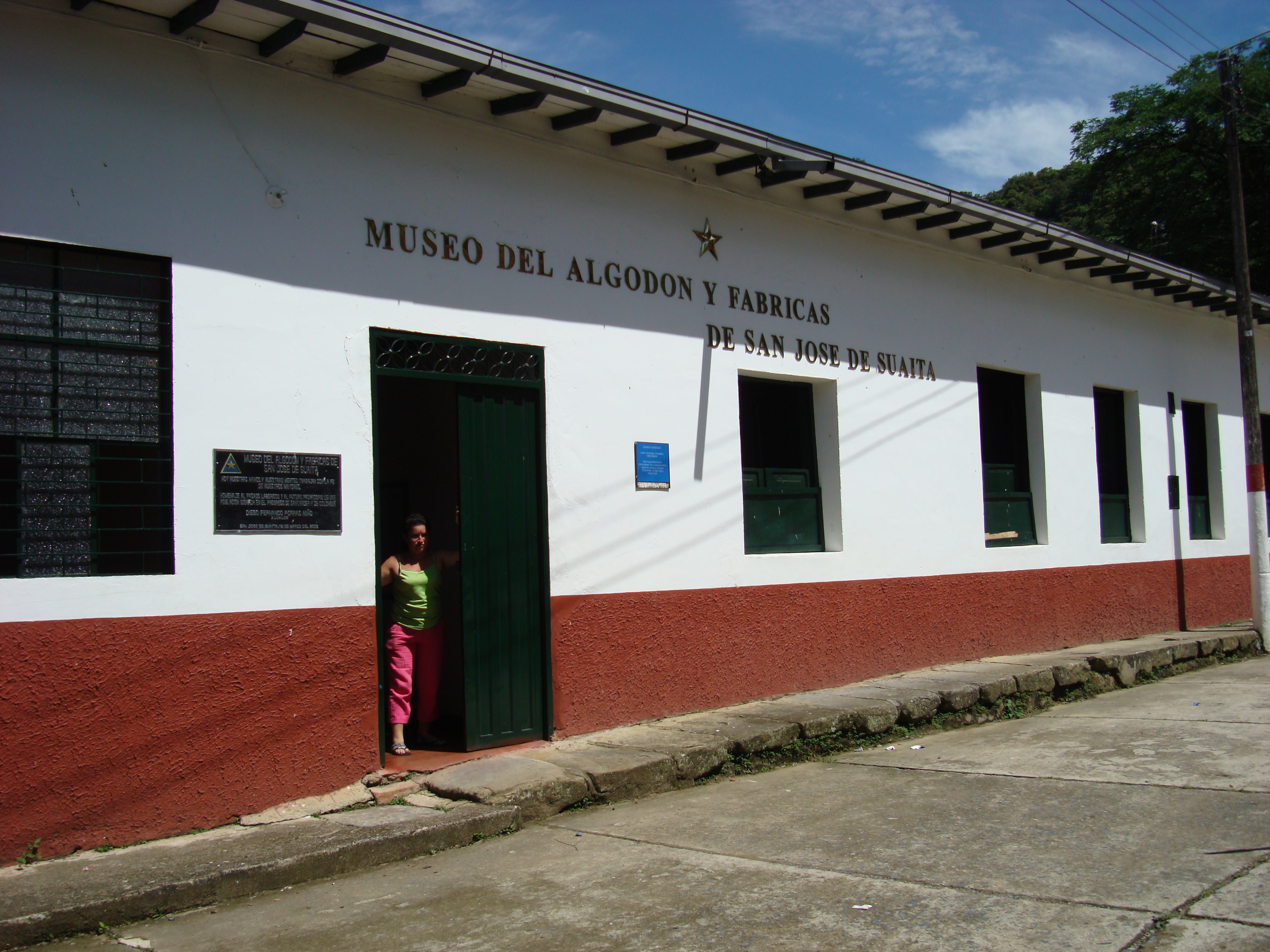
Museum headquarters

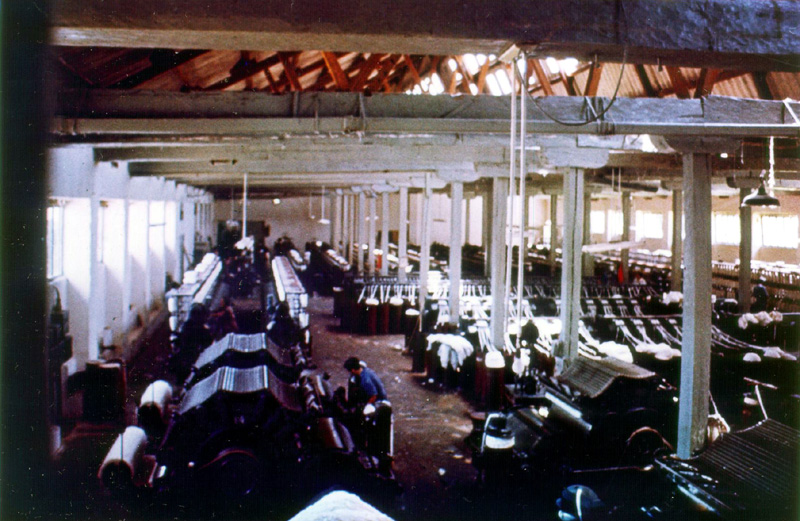
Cotton-spinning machinery

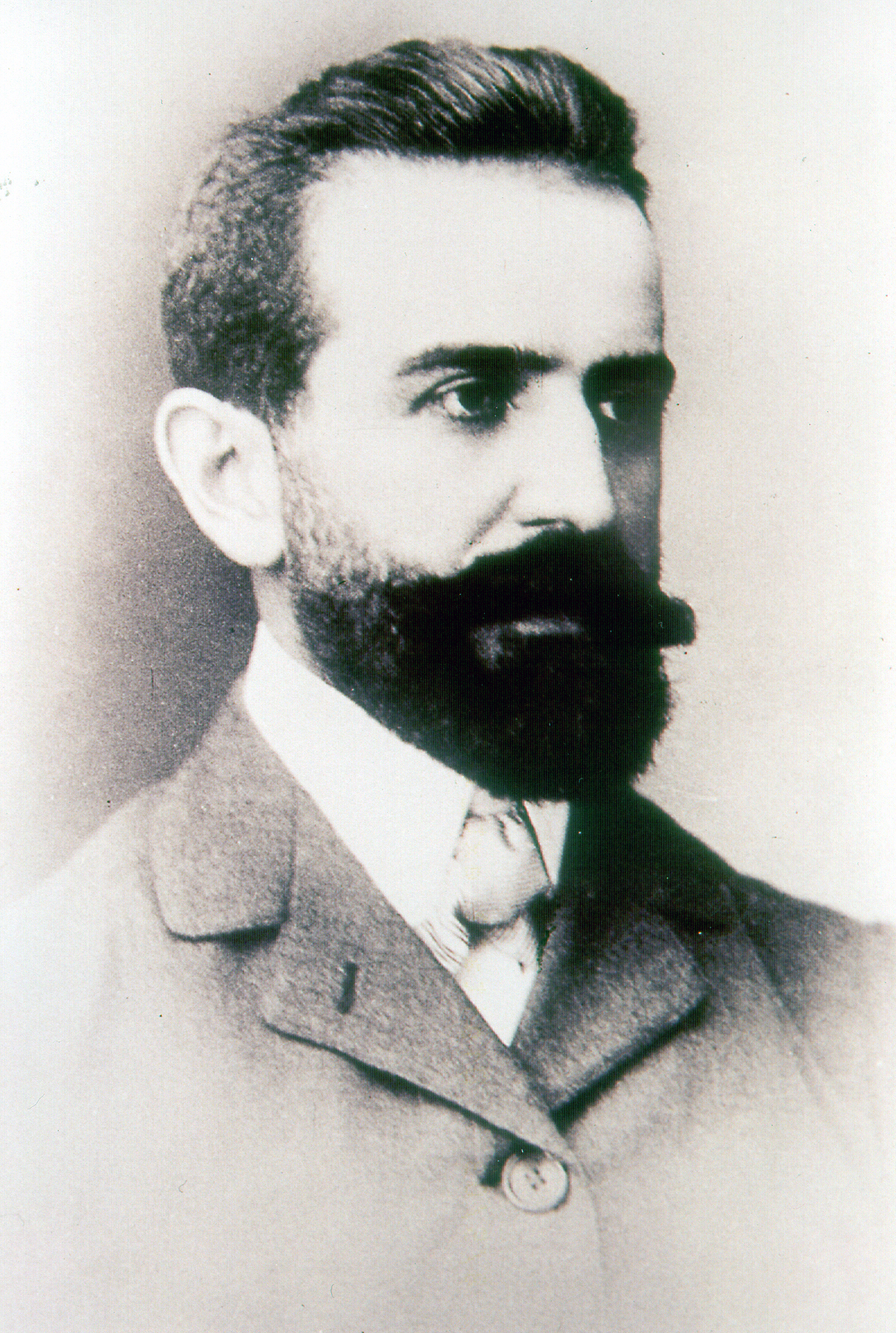
Lucas Caballero Barrera

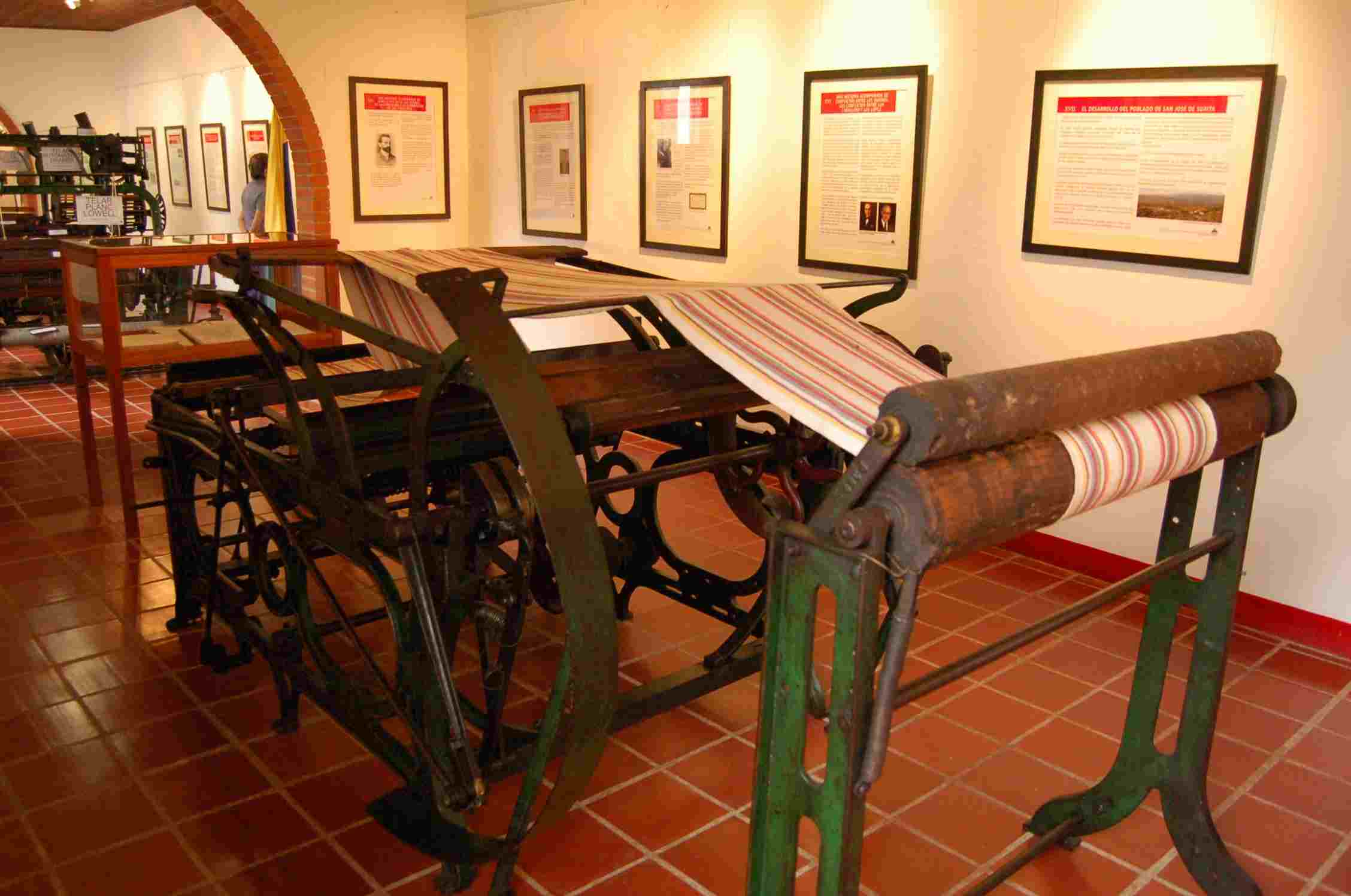
textile pressing

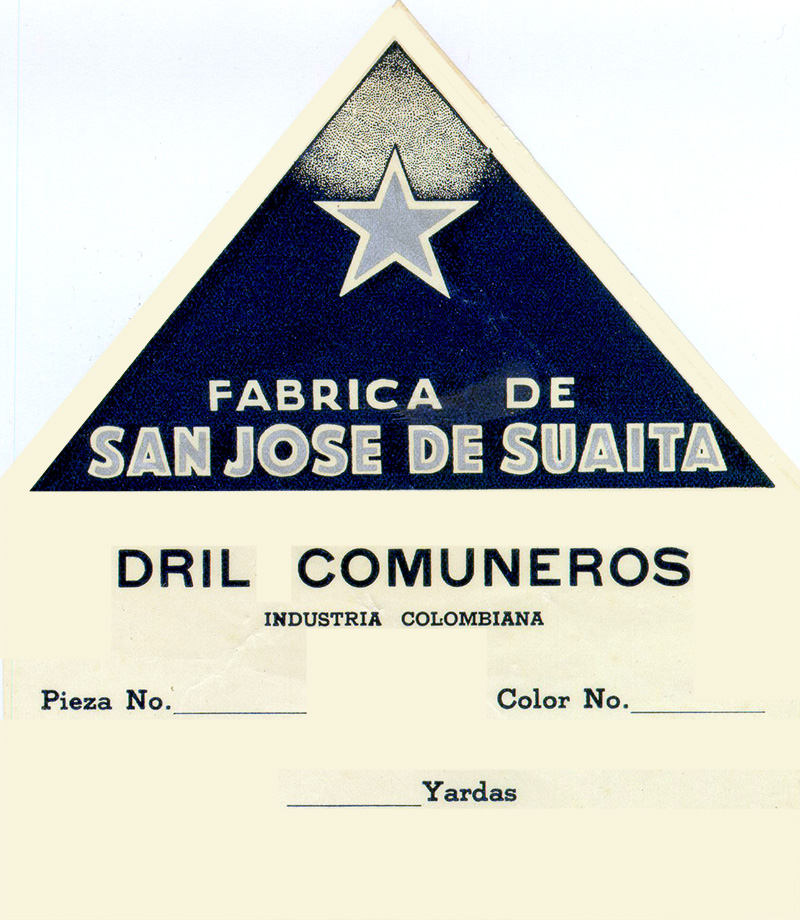
"Dril Comuneros" Label

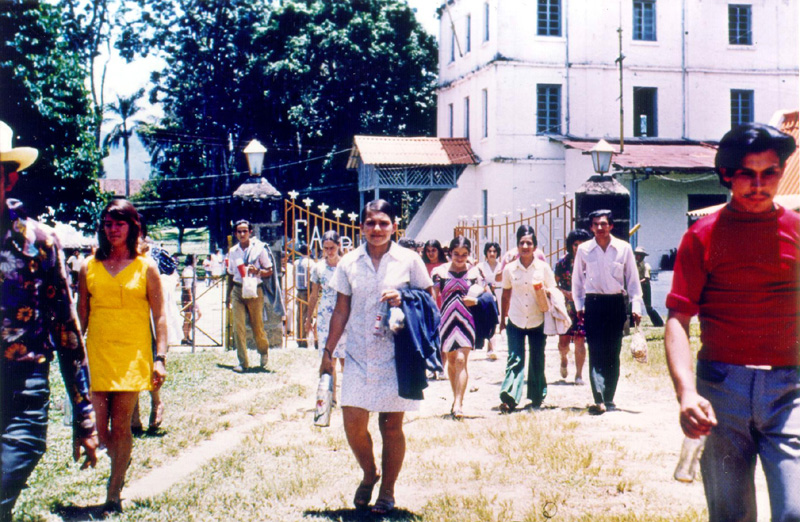
Working people - 1970

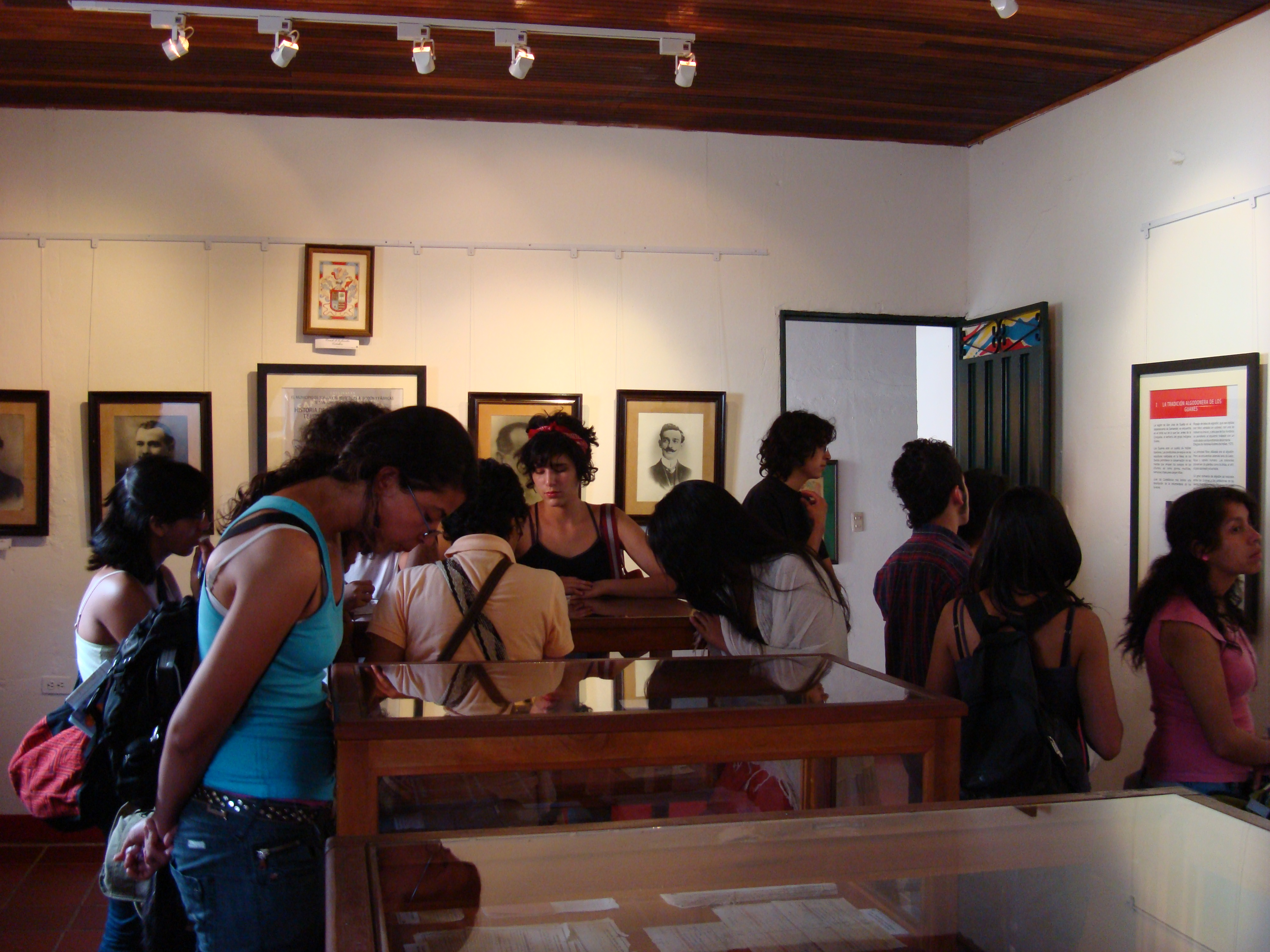
Museum visitors

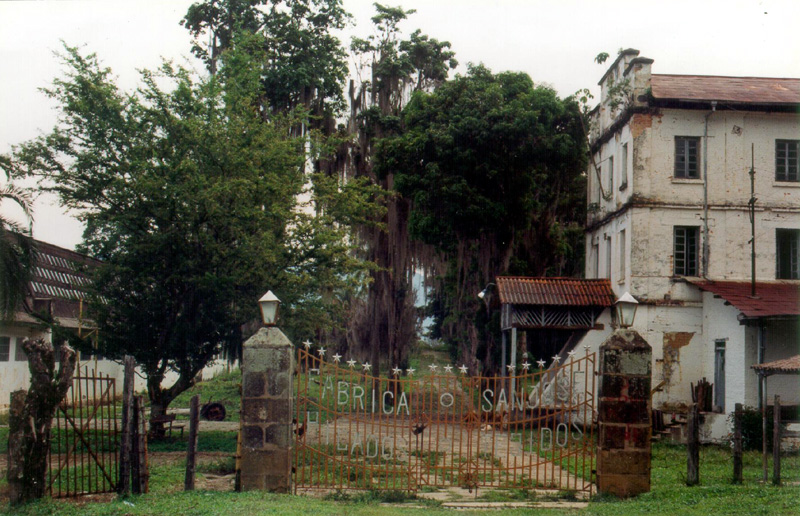
Ruins

== Wildlife and fauna ==
San José de Suaita has a private wildlife sanctuary containing 1,000 acres (4.0 km^{2}) of hardwoods including oak.
