= List of Colombian people by net worth =

This is a list of Colombian billionaires based on The World's Billionaires, an annual assessment of wealth and assets compiled and published by Forbes magazine.

== Colombian billionaires (2025) ==
| World Rank | Name | Citizenship | Net worth (USD) | Source of wealth | Ref. |
|---|---|---|---|---|---|
| 236 | David Vélez & family | Colombia | 10.7 billion | Fintech (Nubank) | |
| 236 | Jaime Gilinski Bacal | Colombia | 10.7 billion | Banking | |
| 369 | Luis Carlos Sarmiento | Colombia | 8.2 billion | Banking | |
| 823 | Beatriz Davila de Santo Domingo | Colombia | 4.4 billion | Beer | |

== See also ==
- The World's Billionaires
- List of countries by number of billionaires
