= Colombia and the World Bank =

A map of Colombia divided into the different departments.

Colombia has a long-standing relationship with the World Bank that started in 1946 when the country signed the IBRD Articles of Agreement. During the early years of the World Bank, which was founded in 1945, Colombia served as a main strategic partner when the focus of the institution shifted from the reconstruction of Europe to assisting the development in poor countries. The subsequent cooperation between the World Bank and the country has led to a variety of different projects being implemented. As of November 2018 there has been to a total of over 280 projects, of which 20 are presently active, in an array of sectors such as assistance of the central government, the sub-national government and social protection. The current active commitment amount is US$2.3 billion.

The self-proclaimed mission of the World Bank is to reduce the share of the global population that is living in extreme poverty and to increase the income of the poorest 40 percent in every country. In Colombia the percentage of people living on less than US$1.90, which is the international poverty line as defined by the World Bank, has decreased from 16.5 percent in 1996 (earliest data available) to 4.5 percent in 2016. This indicates progress with regard to the first goal. While the GDP per capita increased from US$4,862.07 in 1996 to US$7,531.98 in 2016 (measured in constant 2010 US$), the GINI coefficient decreased from 56.9 to 50.8 during that same timeframe. This is signalling an advancement concerning the second goal. However, inequality remains among the highest in South America.

== Selected Projects ==
There has been a variety of notable projects that were executed in cooperation between the World Bank and Colombia. A number of these are related to education, which is a significant part of the agenda of the World Bank. Furthermore, support is provided for the construction of an important and prestigious infrastructure project - the Bogotá Metro - that is expected to start in 2019.

=== Education ===
The World Bank has executed a variety of projects that were designed to improve the accessibility of education. In 2002 the "Higher Education - Improving Access" project was approved. The program was designed to increase both the equity in access and the quality of tertiary education. This was done through the means of student-aid which was meant to encourage students to participate in a doctoral program. Furthermore, close monitoring of the labor market should provide information to the institutions that will help them in offering an education which equips students with skills that are actually being demanded.

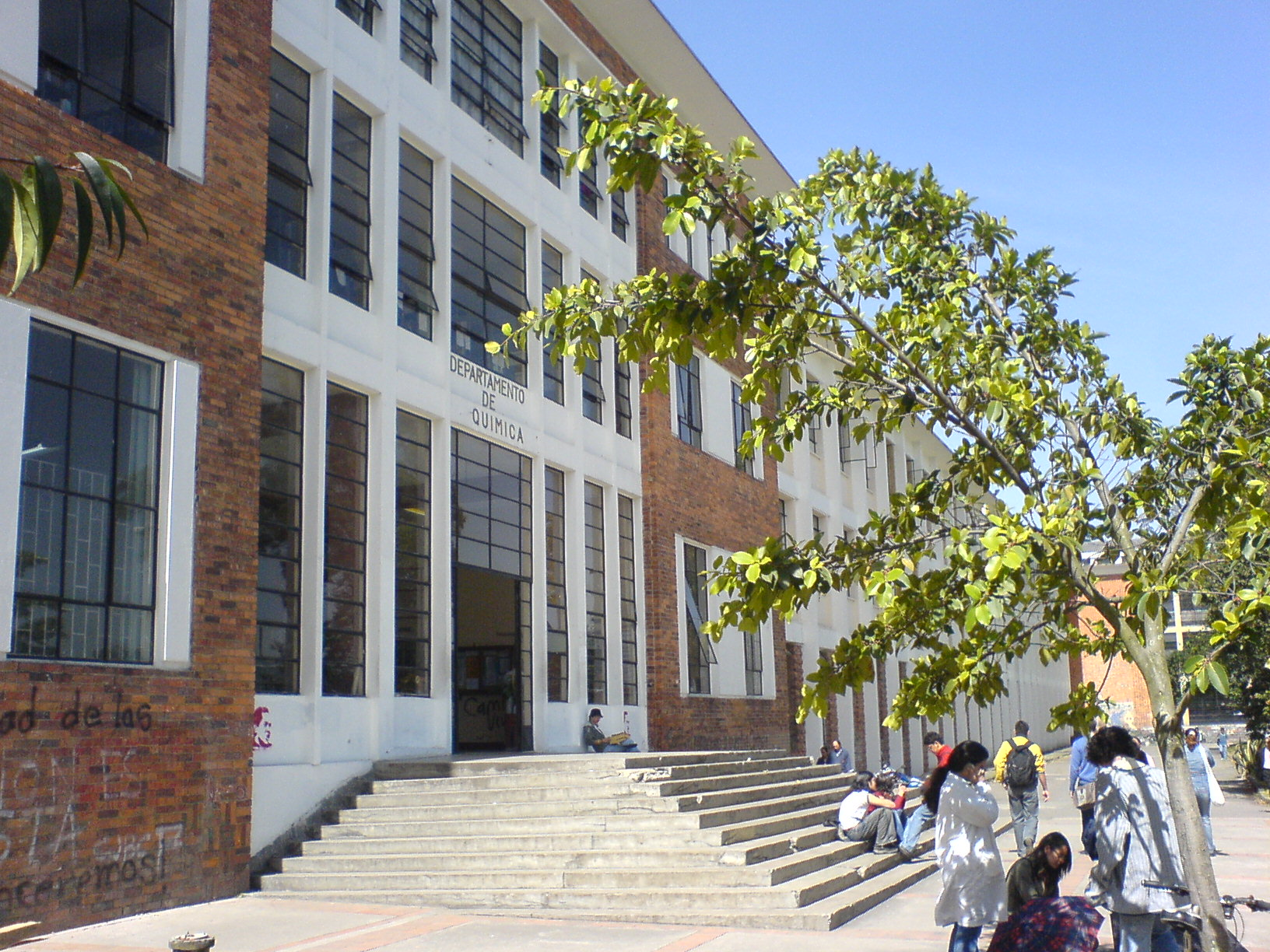
The chemistry department of the National University of Colombia, the largest educational community in the country.

In 2008 the "Second Adaptable Program Lending" (APL) was ratified which encompasses two phases, namely the "Second Student Loan Support Project (APL Phase 1)" and the "Colombia Rural Education Project (APL Phase 2)". The first phase had the goal of increasing enrolment and graduation rates in tertiary education by facilitating access for students from economically disadvantaged backgrounds. Funding for tertiary education was expanded and the sources from which to receive funding have been diversified. The second phase was specifically designed to offer access to education in a number of rural municipalities.

The "Access and Quality in Higher Education Project - PACES" has been approved in 2017. It consists of three different components that are designed to improve the quality of tertiary education and increase enrolment of students from socio-economic disadvantaged backgrounds. The three components are: i) an increased availability of loans; ii) an improvement in the quality of educational institutions; and iii) an improvement in the governmental agencies responsible for education.

In total the commitment amount by the World Bank to this extract of educational projects was $US 660 million. Generally, the effort that the World Bank has been putting not only into these three exemplary projects, but into a large number of others in addition to that, has improved the access to and the quality of education and is expected to keep doing so in the future.

=== Bogotá Metro ===
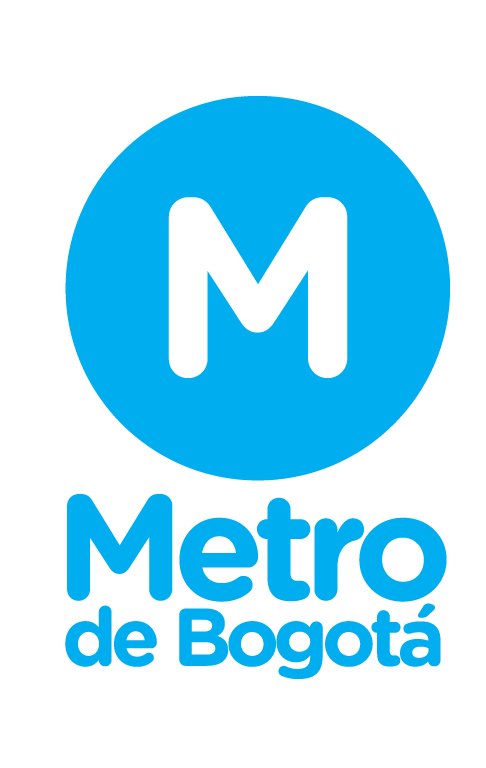
Bogotá Metro Logo.

The World Bank is attempting to support the construction of the metro in Bogotá, the capital of Colombia. Assistance is going to be provided in two phases. The first phase is concerned with the technical part of undertaking the construction process. A second phase will be oriented towards the integration of the new metro into the public transportation system of Bogotá and in conducting research in different areas such as pollution, security and safety. Furthermore, the Bogota metro company will receive help in building a functioning institutional structure.

The first in a series of envisioned programmes that are designed for this purpose was approved in 2018 and has a commitment amount of $US 70 million. This infrastructure project is the largest being implemented in Colombia and is important for an increased accessibility to the city, the urban development and it will generally higher the quality of public transportation.

== Strategic Partnership ==
=== IBRD and IDA ===
In the fiscal year of 2018 Colombia was the number ten top borrower country of the IBRD with a total of US$702 million in commitments.

As of November 2018 there is a total of 286 projects, of which 251 have been closed, 11 have been dropped, 20 are active and 4 are in the pipeline.

=== IFC ===
As of June 30, 2018 Colombia is placed on rank eight on the list of IFC's largest country exposures with a total of US$1343 million in the committed portfolio making up 2.35% of the global portfolio.

=== MIGA ===
In March 2018 MIGA announced the support for a variety of projects that are being implemented through a state-owned enterprise by providing a credit guarantee for foreign direct investment amounting to a total of US$95 million. It is the first time ever that MIGA is offering a guarantee for a loan that is given to a state-owned enterprise.

=== ICSID ===
Colombia has signed the Convention on the Settlement of Investment Disputes between States and Nationals of other states on May 18, 1993.

Of the fifty-seven newly registered cases at the ICSID in the fiscal year of 2018, the instrument invoked as a basis of consent was the U.S. - Colombia Free Trade Agreement in 2% of the cases and the Canada - Colombia Free Trade Agreement in 3% of the cases.
