= Haceb =

Colombian appliances factory

Industrias Haceb S.A.
- Type: Private
- Industry: Electrical appliance and gas appliance
- Founded: 1940
- Founder: José María Acevedo
- Headquarters: Copacabana, Colombia
- Products: Refrigeration; Water Heater; Washer; Microwave; Stoves
- Owner: José María Acevedo
- Website: Haceb

Industrias Haceb S.A. is a Colombian company manufacturing heating, domestic and commercial refrigeration.

Haceb Industries started in 1940 as a small electrical repair shop, and currently has over 2,800 employees. It has a presence in Colombia as well as several other countries, such as the United States of America, where it markets its own brands, Haceb and Icasa. This company is also involved in strategic partnerships with international companies.

== History ==
By the time the company was founded in a small shop in Medellín, World War II had limited the supply of steel-based materials, since these were required by the military. This led to fewer new products being imported. The new company took advantage of the increased demand for industrial materials, producing electrical appliances.

From its founding until the 1960s, the technical part of the company worked alongside the production and sales divisions to add value to the sale of the first appliances. However, this was limited to the requirements of the customers. In 1942, production began with the manufacture of kitchen appliances; in 1951, the inclusion of electric heaters expanded the range of products. Line heaters began being produced by this company in 1956. In 1966, the company began producing fully porcelain-enameled refrigerators. These were very successful, leading to the construction of a cooling plant (in 1984) as a specialised system dedicated to making these appliances. In 1985, a production line of covered electric recessed furnaces and integrated cooker hoods was started. The company started a production line of gas cookers, stoves and recessed oven gas (between 1990 and 1995).

In 1993, branches were formed elsewhere in Colombia (including Bogotá) to increase the company's nationwide presence. In 1998, shopping freezers and beverage dispensers were added to Haceb Industries' cooling-appliance line; in addition, the range of gas appliances was expanded to meet the high demand for gas cookers in Colombia. In 1999, a new organisational model was launched, allowing the company to increase the focus on its commercial business and expand its portfolio of products.

2001 was a difficult period for Colombian industry, due to economic recession and increased unemployment across the world. Despite the sharp decline in national and international demand for its products, though, Haceb Industries continued its strategy of technological and managerial innovation, allowing it to continue competing successfully in the electrical and gas appliance market. In 2002, some parts of the production line were transferred to a heating plant in Copacabana. In addition, work was underway for the development of an improved conditioning and refrigeration plant. The DHA Water Dispenser 3.3 LT. was released during this year, as well as the Standard GM2 Line Refrigerators Soft Line.

In 2003, in response to the need for increased strength against the FTAA (Free Trade Area of the Americas), Haceb Industries consolidated its position as a large-scale technology company, optimised its production and expansion and improved its portfolio of products. During this year, they purchased the brand Icasa as part of their programme to consolidate their nationwide profile. They also increased their investment in technology, launching the Integrated Management Information System ASW with the aim of connecting their entire supply chain together. The company also acquired a tool for 3D design: this allowed them to streamline the production process, optimise resources and reduce time taken for delivery. Haceb of Ecuador was established in order to increase the company's profile in Ecuador. 2006 saw the company strengthening its position in international markets. Contracts were signed with major chemical companies, which prompted the company to comply with international trade standards. Additionally, Haceb of Venezuela and Mexico were formed. During this year, the company was very focused on technology, seeking to acquire new machinery and upgrade certain production processes. For the domestic market, two new Haceb Exhibition Halls, which house the entire portfolio of Haceb products and provide comprehensive advice to their clients, were put into operation. The first is located in the Guayabal district of Medellín; the second is located on the Company's premises in Copacabana, Antioquia.
