= WWB Colombia =

WWB Colombia is a microfinance institution in Colombia.

== History ==
WWB Colombia - Cali was founded in 1980 by a group of professional and businesswomen in Cali, Colombia.

WWB Colombia was the first entity to grant a micro loan in the country. Today it is one of three main microcredit players in Colombia. It was the first to affiliate to the Women's World Banking International Network.

It received financial and technical support from various institutions, including the Inter-American Development Bank, FOMIN (Multilateral Investment Fund), International Finance Corporation, German Technical Cooperation, Consultative Group to Assist the Poor and Development Bank of Latin America.

In February 2005, WWB Colombia issued its first bond on the Colombian Stock Exchange. The amount, in two tranches, was $120.000 million (US$52 million). The rating by Duff & Phelps was AA+.

As of December 31, 2008, WWB Colombia had 230.000 current loans. The number of jobs generated by microenterprises funded by WWB Colombia amounted to 280.000.

As of March 2009, WWB Colombia had approximately 1.000 employees and a network of 59 branches. Its headquarters were in Cali, Colombia. Clara Serra de Akerman is the president.

== Impact and products ==
The group uses an individual loan methodology based on a computerized information system. The institution's client-base is 67% women, mainly from the 1st, 2nd and 3rd strata of the population (the lowest income strata). The clients’ main business activities revolve around production (20%), sales (55%) and service (25%) sectors.

WWB Colombia offers loans starting at US$50. However, the average loan size is US$1.100. Loans are provided through simple procedures and personalized attention. Terms and rates are fixed according to the type of microbusiness, and collateral requirements according to the condition of each micro entrepreneur. 82% of all loans granted by the institution are renewals. WWB Colombia also offers insurance (life and education).

== Sources ==
- WWB Colombia Annual Report 2007 - in English (198 KB)
- WWB Colombia Annual Report 2007 - in Spanish (6,9 MB)
- WWB Colombia website
