= Free trade agreements of Colombia =

Colombia is a relatively open, free market economy that is party to many free trade agreements (FTAs) worldwide. It has signed free trade agreements with many of its biggest trading partners including the United States and the European Union, and is a founding member of the Pacific Alliance regional trade bloc.

== Active agreements ==
- Pacific Alliance (founding member, along with Mexico, Peru and Chile)
- Panama-Colombia Free Trade Agreement|Panama - Colombia Agreement
- Canada–Colombia Free Trade Agreement
- El Salvador, Guatemala, Honduras - Colombia Free Trade Agreements
- United States-Colombia Free Trade Agreement
- Colombia – European free trade association agreement
- Colombia – European Union Association agreement
- Andean Countries (Colombia, Ecuador, Peru ) - United Kingdom Free Trade Agreement

== Trade organization membership ==
- Pacific Alliance (founding member)
- Andean Community
- Caribbean Community (CARICOM) Agreement
- World Trade Organization
- Latin American Integration Association

== Agreements awaiting approval ==
There are no trade agreements awaiting approval as of February 2016.

== Obsolete agreements ==
- Colombia-United Kingdom Free Trade Agreement
