= Ocensa pipeline =

- Location of Ocensa pipeline

Location
- Country: Colombia
- State: Cundinamarca, Boyacá, Antioquia, Córdoba
- Coordinates: 8°00′N 75°00′W
- Start: Cusiana and Cupiagua oilfields
- To: Coveñas

General information
- Type: Crude oil
- Partners: Ecopetrol; BP; Total S.A. Petrominerales; Triton Colombia

Technical information
- Length: 829 km (515 mi)
- Maximum discharge: 0.65 million barrels per day (~3.2×10^{7} t/a)
- No. of pumping stations: 5
- Pumping stations: Stations

The Ocensa pipeline (Oleoducto Central) is a crude oil pipeline in Colombia. It starts on the Cusiana and Cupiagua oilfields and runs to Coveñas on Colombia's Caribbean coastline. It is owned by the consortium of Ecopetrol, BP, Total S.A., Petrominerales and Triton Colombia.

== Technical description ==
The pipeline is 829 kilometres (515 mi) long. It has capacity of 650 thousand barrels per day (~3.2×10^{7} t/a). The pipeline is connected with the 235-kilometre (146 mi) long ODL pipeline (Oleoductos de Los Llanos), which transports oil from the Rubiales heavy oil field in the Llanos Basin.

== Stations ==
The oil pipeline counts with the following pumping stations (info updated in 2017):

- Cupiagua Station - 00
- Cusiana Station - 01
- El Porvenir Station - 02
- Páez Station - 03
- Miraflores Station - 04
- La Belleza Station - 05
- Vasconia Station - 06
- Chiquillo Station - 07
- Caucasia Station - 08
- Granjita Station - 09
- Coveñas Termina - 10

== Partnerships ==
In January 2010 Pacific Rubiales Energy signed a 10-years contract to use the pipeline for transporting up to 160 million barrels (25×10^{6} m^{3}) of oil over 10 years.

== See also ==
- Caño Limón – Coveñas pipeline
