= Frontera Energy =

Canadian petroleum exploration and production company

- Type: Public
- Traded as: TSX: FEC
- Industry: Oil and Gas
- Predecessor: Pacific Rubiales Energy Corp. (1982-2015); Pacific Exploration and Production (2015-2017)
- Founded: 2009
- Headquarters: Toronto, Ontario, Canada
- Key people: Orlando Cabrales Segovia (CEO)
- Revenue: ▲US$ 4.6 billion (2013)
- Operating income: ▲US$ 1.1 billion (2013)
- Net income: ▼US$ 430.4 million (2013)
- Number of employees: 2,506
- Subsidiaries: Pacific E&P Holdings Corp., Meta Petroleum Corp., Pacific Stratus International Energy Ltd., Pacific Stratus Energy Colombia Corp., Pacific Stratus Energy S.A., Pacific Off Shore Peru S.R.L., Pacific Rubiales Guatemala S.A., Pacific Guatemala Energy Corp., PRE-PSIE Coöperatief U.A., Petrominerales Colombia Corp. and Grupo C&C Energia (Barbados) Ltd.
- Website: www.fronteraenergy.ca

Frontera Energy (formerly Pacific Exploration and Production) is a Canadian petroleum exploration and production company in the business of heavy crude oil and natural gas. Its focus is on Colombia and Peru where it holds numerous properties including 38 blocks in the Llanos, Sucre-Co Lower Magdalena and Cesar Valley, Rancheria, Upper and Middle Magdalena Valley, Putumayo Valley, Ucayali and Maranon basins. In early 2010 it was the largest independent oil company operating in South America and in terms of private companies the fastest growing one in Colombia. In 2011 it was responsible for 41% of the growth in oil production in Colombia. In mid-2015 it changed its name from Pacific Rubiales to Pacific Exploration and Production, signalling the diminished importance of the Rubiales oil field in Colombia in the company's total assets and a broader focus in Latin America. When Pacific Exploration and Production filed for bankruptcy protection on April 27, 2016, it listed Pacific E&P Holdings Corp., Meta Petroleum Corp., Pacific Stratus International Energy Ltd., Pacific Stratus Energy Colombia Corp., Pacific Stratus Energy S.A., Pacific Off Shore Peru S.R.L., Pacific Rubiales Guatemala S.A., Pacific Guatemala Energy Corp., PRE-PSIE Coöperatief U.A., Petrominerales Colombia Corp. and Grupo C&C Energia (Barbados) Ltd. as subsidiaries. In June 2017, it renamed itself Frontera Energy, and was relisted on the Toronto Stock Exchange.

== History ==
Pacific Exploration and Production was known as Petro Rubiales from 1982, when the company began operating in the Rubiales oil fields in Colombia, until 2015 when its name was changed. It had origins in Agincourt Explorations in 1987, a TSX Venture Exchange listed company. In 1995 Agincourt Explorations, Agincourt Explorations became AGX Resources Corp.; a mineral exploration company focused on Brazil and Canada. After AGX acquired Rubiales Holdings in 2007 from Petro Rubiales it became known as Petro Rubiales Energy Corp. up until 2008 when it merged with Vancouver-based Pacific Stratus Energy Ltd. in a $2.5 billion causing a name change to Pacific Rubiales Energy Corp. Less than two weeks after the merger the company delisted from the TSX Venture Exchange. Later in 2008 it acquired Kappa Energy, a Colombian exploration company with licenses to 747,000 acres (3,020 km^{2}) of land which included parts of the lower, middle, and upper Magdalena, Catatumbo, and Llanos basins. The transaction was valued at $168 million and increased Pacific Rubiales' possible reserves by 24.2 million boe. By 2008, Kappa was part of division Kappa Energy Holdings. On October 19, 2011 it became engaged in oil drilling activity in northern Guatemala. In January 2010, Petro Rubiales signed a $190 million deal with Ocensa pipeline to use their pipeline and oil transport infrastructure to transport up to 160 million barrels of oil for a period of ten years. In September 2010, Petro Rubiales followed through with its promise to focus more on developing assets already mature or low risk and less on exploration in high risk areas by divesting itself of fields within the Buganviles oil and gas block of Colombia. It sold a 29.5% interest in Visure and 25% in Tuqueque to a subsidiary of Peruvian company Petrodorado. Though the deal gives Petrodorado a near joint interest in the Buganviles block (45-49.5%) Pacific Rubiales remains the controlling operator. On February 1, 2012 Pacific Rubiales Energy became the first Canadian company to receive approval from BM&F Bovespa to issue Brazilian Depository Receipts for trading on the Brazilian stock exchange. In early 2015 as oil prices were declining, Alejandro Betancourt López of Derwick Associates led an investment group to purchase a 20% share of the company for $290 million. On April 27, 2016 the Pacific Exploration & Production Corporation and its subsidiaries filed for bankruptcy protection, and began the process of restructuring. In 2017, it renamed itself Frontera Energy, and was relisted on the Toronto Stock Exchange.

== Properties/Production ==
As of December 2011, 80% of the company's 407 mboe 2P reserves are in oil with most of the other 20% in natural gas, 317 mboe are proved reserves. On March 28, 2011 gross reserves were at 357.39 million boe 87% of which is net reserves. By June 2011 net proved reserves were 350 million boe up 15% or 40 million barrels in six months. In September 2011 net reserves stood at 341.73 million boe, slightly lower than the previous quarter due to a decline in heavy oil reserves. For the 2011 fiscal year, 75.7% of total field production of 165,446 bbls/d came from the Rubiales/Piriri field (up 34% on the year). Quifa was second at 36,496 bbls/d (up 657%). Share after royalties averaged over 2011; 63% came from Rubiales/Piriri (54,802 bbls/d up 29%), 22% from Quifa (19,181 b/d up 629%), 12% from La Creciente (10,584 b/d up 7% after being up 34% in 2010). As of September 30, 2011 net reserves are 341.73 mboe, up from 269 mboe in December 2010. In 2011, fields that Pacific Rubiales has a joint or majority interest in accounted for just under 20% of Colombia's oil output. Since October 2010, Pacific Rubiales also had a working interest in 2 other blocks in the Petén Basin of Guatemala (shared with Flamingo Energy Investment (BVI) Ltd., Chx Guatemala Limitada, and Compañía Petrolera del Atlántico). By 2010, Pacific Rubiales shared joint ownership in many oil fields and exploration projects in Colombia with Ecopetrol and in Peru with Petrodorado. By 2001, Pacific Rubiales' most valuable assets were the Rubiales (largest in Colombia) and Piriri oil fields in central Colombia which it operates through Meta Petroleum, a division of subsidiary Rubiales Holdings Limited (RHL). RHL has been 100% owned by pacific Rubiales since 2007 when it purchased the remaining 25% of outstanding shares. In 2010, Pacific Rubiales planned to enter the coal and asphalite production market through acquisitions (Pacific Coal S.A.).

=== Colombia ===
In 2010, Pacific Rubiales and Ecopetrol Rubiales jointly owned the Piriri fields, which covered 72,839 acres (294.77 km^{2}) of land 148 km from Puerto Gaitan. Oil was first discovered there in 1982 but production didn't begin until 1988 when the Rubiales risk participation contract was signed. Operations are conducted through subsidiary Meta Petroleum. By 2011, the Rubiales oil field was the largest in Colombia. It had been neglected before being acquired by Pacific Rubiales. By September 2012, Pacific Rubiales' total field production was 240,975 b/d, 116,285 b/d of which is its share before royalties. By the end of 2011, reserves stood at 407 million barrels that included those considered proven-possible. The data is independently verified. In the last quarter of 2011, Quifa North and Sabanero began production. In 2011, the Rubiales field represented as much as 88% of the Pacific Rubiales' 2P reserves. By December 2011, with the tripling in reserves at Quifa and the upgrading of resources at field CPE-6, Rubiales only accounted for 29% of reserves. Pacific Rubiales owned 60% of the Llanos basin (reserves estimated to be over 4.5 billion barrels for the whole basin) and had the usage rights of the Colombian pipeline system.

=== Peru ===
In 2010, Pacific Rubiales and Petrodorado, jointly owned exploration and development projects, in the Ucayali Basin and the Maranon Basin They began production in Peru in 2012 with an average production during the September 2012 quarter of 2,845 bbl/d (1,394 net). The output was attributable to a 49% interest in Block-Z1.

=== Guatemala ===
In 2010, Pacific Rubiales owned properties in the Petén Basin, southeast of major oil fields in southern Mexico with the option to raise its share to 55% by investing as much as US $25.875 million in exploration and drilling. Pacific Rubiales experienced a steady rise in production in the late 2000s with an average total field production in the third quarter of 2012 of 243,820 b/d. This was 24,684 b/d higher than the previous period. Ecopetrol's 50% interest in the largest field and internal consumption cost the company roughly half that, bringing its share down to 117,679 b/d (up 14,722 b/d) and 97,142 b/d after royalties (up 9,983 b/d). For the first quarter of 2011 output was 196,272 boe/d 34% more than the year before; after royalties production was up 51% to about 80,000 boe/d, production increases came from the same sources as in 2010 (Rubiales, Quifa) in addition to new production from La Creciente (to 9,700 boe/d). In early 2010 total gross daily production (not including royalties based on output levels and crude oil prices) was around 130,000 boe/d compared to about 83,000 boe/d in 2009. In 2009 about 8.6 million barrels of oil it produced was exported while 1.6 million barrels of oil was used domestically in Colombia. In the first three months of 2011 the company sold 26% more oil than in the corresponding period in 2010 (7.447 million boe or about 83,000 boe/d). Because it was producing below a certain royalties threshold, nearly all gross production before royalties coming from La Creciente is kept after royalties.

== Sales ==
In 2012, during the third quarter of the year the company sold 89,045 b/d of oil and 10,775 b/d of natural gas for a total of 99,820 b/d (down from 101,533) at an average sales price of $95.13 (up from $88.66). The company purchases some of the oil that it sells. In 2011, over the first nine months of the year, the company transported 120,172 bpd of oil through various pipeline systems, two thirds of which went through the ocensa pipeline and another 14,204 bpd via trucks. For the third quarter total field production was 219,136 bpd up 52%. Its share net of internal consumption after royalties was 87,159 bpd up 54.5%, 30,577 bpd of which came from new production Rubiales and Quifa (up from 19,241 bpd from 1,754 bpd). At an average sales price of $94.67/bbl (up 39%) that gave it revenue of $2.369 billion (up 107%). For the 2010 year, total net production was 56,974 boe/d, 67% higher than in 2009; Most of the increase came from growth at the Rubiales heavy oil field. Although revenue was 173% higher in the first half of 2010 than in the first half of 2009 net income continued to be weighed down by depreciation, amortization and foreign exchange losses (though the company rebounded from a $65.9 million net loss in the first half of 2009).

== Controversies ==
Pacific Rubiales has been the focus of various controversies over the years, ranging from allegations of collusion with paramilitary death-squads, suppression of labor rights, manipulation of stock prices, and production figures, besides harassment of journalists through ad revenue pressure upon media companies to drop negative coverage. In September 2011, workers at Pacific Rubiales went on a violent strike over wages in Rubiales. Pacific Rubiales, who owned a 50% stake, suspended explorations for oil in Putumayo.

It was alleged that paramilitary forces took some of that land by illegal means before transferring ownership over to Kappa Energy, a company that Pacific Rubiales had acquired in 2008. (The total reserves associated with Kappa Energy represented only a fraction of Pacific Rubiales total). The complaints go back to 2001; the prosecution claimed that the real owners of the land were forcefully displaced. The defence called the land transfer agreements valid and disputed the validity of their claims (only one of them actually lived on the land). Working conditions were also criticized with as many as twenty people living in one tent, according to journalist Alfred Molano in a September 25, 2011 article in the El Espectador.

In 2012 the company came under criticism for beginning oil exploration activities on land inhabited by the Matsés indigenous people of Peru. It was argued that the deforestation of hundreds of seismic testing lines and the drilling of test wells would threaten water sources depended upon by the tribe, and that the activity would also risk exposing uncontacted tribes in the surrounding areas to disease.

In November 2012, Colombian journalist Guillermo Quiroz Delgado was covering local protests against Pacific Rubiales, which was accused of exploiting the area's residents. He died due to police mistreatment, which brought attention to the complaints against the company.
