= Llanos Basin =

Sedimentary basin in Colombia

- Cuenca Llanos
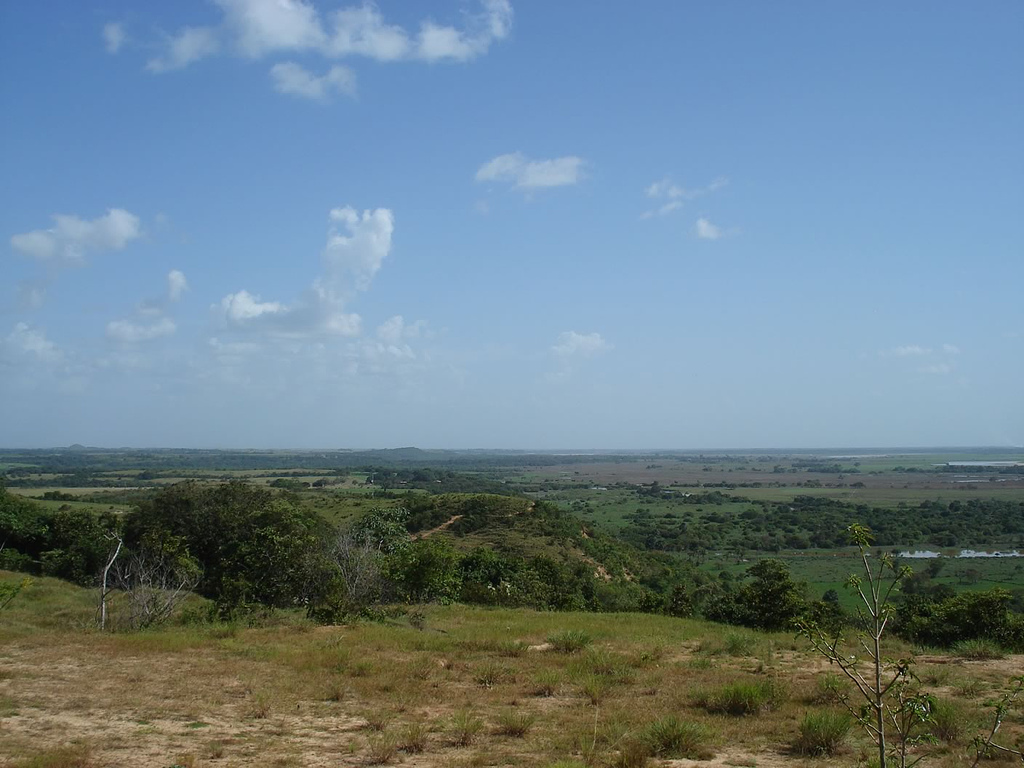
- The Llanos Basin in Puerto López, Meta
- Coordinates: 05°24′00″N 71°40′00″W
- Etymology: Llanos Orientales; Spanish: "eastern plains"
- Region: Orinoquía
- Country: Colombia
- States: Arauca, Boyacá, Casanare, Cundinamarca, Guainía, Guaviare, Meta, Norte de Santander
- Cities: Villavicencio, Yopal

Characteristics
- On/Offshore: Onshore
- Boundaries: Colombia-Venezuela border (N), Guiana Shield (E), Vaupés Arch (S), Serranía de la Macarena (SW), Eastern Ranges (W)
- Part of: Andean foreland basins
- Area: 96,000 km^{2} (37,000 sq mi)

Hydrology
- Rivers: Orinoco watershed Main rivers: Arauca, Meta, Guaviare, Vichada

Geology
- Basin type: Foreland on rift basin (Note: More detailed: continental margin (Protero- and Paleozoic), rift basin (Mesozoic), foredeep (Paleogene and early Neogene), foreland (late Neogene to recent))
- Plate: South American (Note: The northernmost of three Colombian basins on this plate, to the south the Caguán-Putumayo and Vaupés-Amazonas Basins)
- Orogeny: Break-up of Pangea (Mesozoic); Andean (Cenozoic)
- Age: Paleozoic or Jurassic (Note: Depending on the definition of basement, the stratigraphic succession starts either in the Paleozoic on Proterozoic crystalline basement or Jurassic on top of both) to Holocene
- Stratigraphy: Stratigraphy
- Faults: Eastern (W, bounding), Chichimene & Meta
- Fields: Rubiales, Caño Limón, many more

The Llanos Basin (Spanish: Cuenca Llanos) or Eastern Llanos Basin (Spanish: Cuenca de los Llanos Orientales) is a major sedimentary basin of 96,000 square kilometres (37,000 sq mi) in northeastern Colombia. The onshore foreland on Mesozoic rift basin covers the departments of Arauca, Casanare and Meta and parts of eastern Boyacá and Cundinamarca, western Guainía, northern Guaviare and southeasternmost Norte de Santander. The northern boundary is formed by the border with Venezuela, where the basin grades into the Barinas-Apure Basin.

== Description ==
The northeastern part of Colombia is characterized by its wavy plains, called Llanos Orientales, as part of the bigger Llanos that extend into Venezuela. The landscape is similar to a savanna and is poor in trees. It is located between the Eastern Ranges of the Colombian Andes in the west, the Vaupés Arch in the south and the Guiana Shield in the east.

Geologically, the Llanos Basin underlies this typical landscape of the Llanos. An area where transport occurs mostly by small boats along the many rivers and the "buses of the Llanos", the Douglas DC-3 planes. The basin covers an area of 96,000 square kilometres (37,000 sq mi) and contains a stratigraphic column from the Paleozoic to recent. Several of the formations in the basins are source rocks (Gachetá, Los Cuervos, Carbonera C8), reservoir rocks (Mirador, Barco, Guadalupe and the uneven numbered members of Carbonera). Seals are formed by the shaly intervals (even numbered) of the Carbonera Formation, Los Cuervos, and León.

The basin is the main petroleum producing basin of Colombia, with four of the nations biggest oil fields located in the Llanos Basin. Major fields are Rubiales, Colombia's biggest and most recent giant discovery sealed by a complex of hydrodynamic processes, and Caño Limón, at the border with Venezuela.

Major concerns in the basin for the production of petroleum are biodegradation, hydrocarbon migration, fault seal capacity and water flow.

=== Hydrography ===
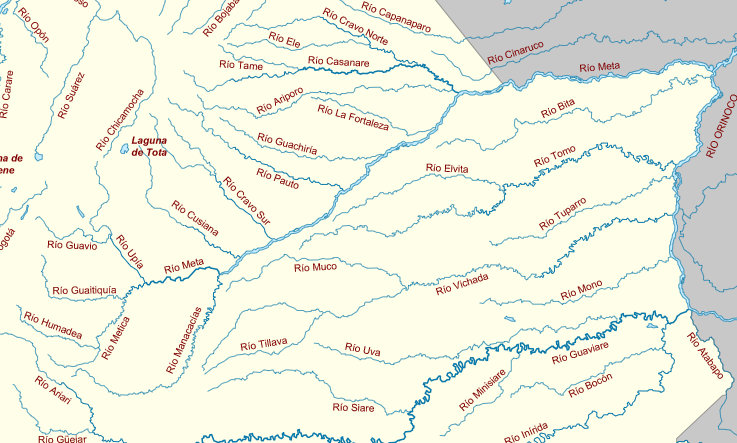
Rivers of the Llanos Basin

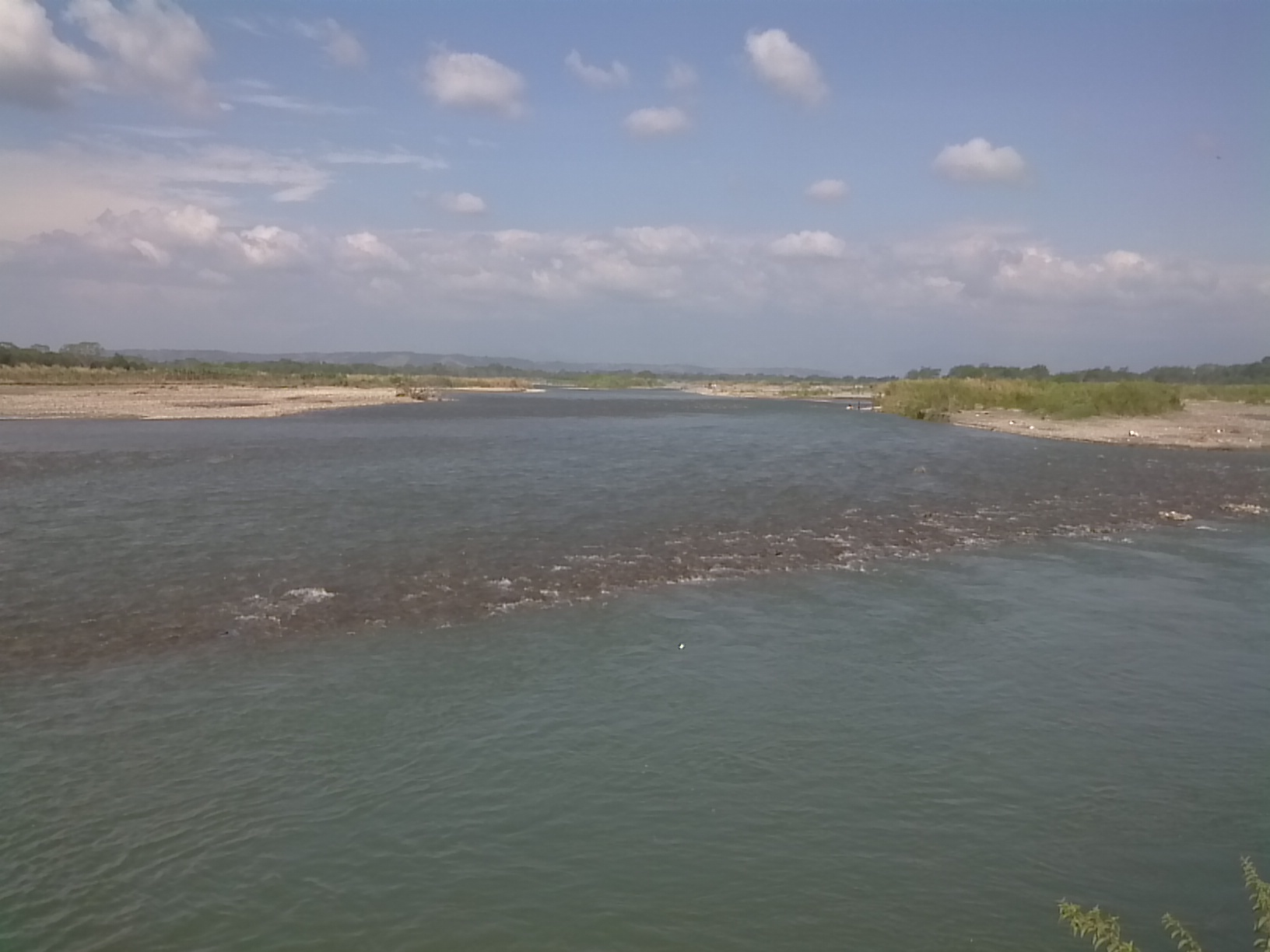
Ariarí River

The Llanos Basin is crossed by numerous rivers, all belonging to the Orinoco watershed. From north to south:

- Arauca River
  - Bojabá
  - Margua
- Orinoco River
  - Capanaparo
  - Cinaruco
  - Tomo
    - Elvita
  - Bita
- Meta River
  - Casanare
    - Cravo Norte
    - Ele
    - Tame
  - Ariporo
  - La Fortaleza
  - Guachiría
  - Pauto
  - Cravo Sur
  - Cusiana
  - Upía
    - Guavio
    - Lengupá
  - Guatiquía
  - Manacacías
  - Metica
    - Guayuriba
- Guaviare River
  - Ariarí
    - Güejar
  - Guayabero
    - Duda
    - Losada
  - Uvá
  - Siare
- Vichada River
  - Muco
  - Tillava

== Flora and fauna ==
=== Fauna ===
Map of national parks in Orinoquía region

Among other species, Lynch's swamp frog (Pseudopaludicola llanera) is endemic to the Llanos, with the species epithet referring to the plains. Also the whip scorpion Mastigoproctus colombianus is reported from the Llanos Basin.

== Geodynamic situation ==
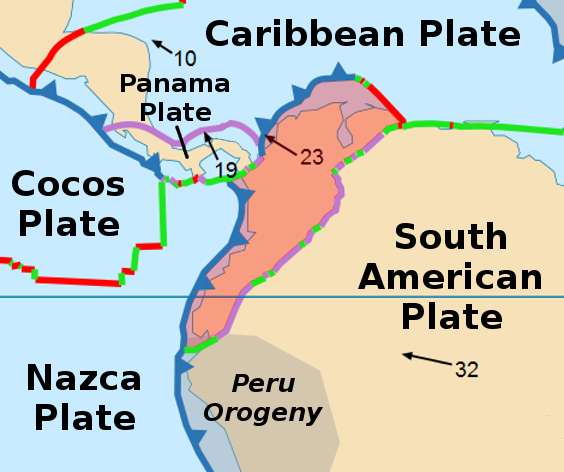
Plate tectonic situation of northwestern South America. Nazca Plate has been subdivided into Coiba and Malpelo Plates

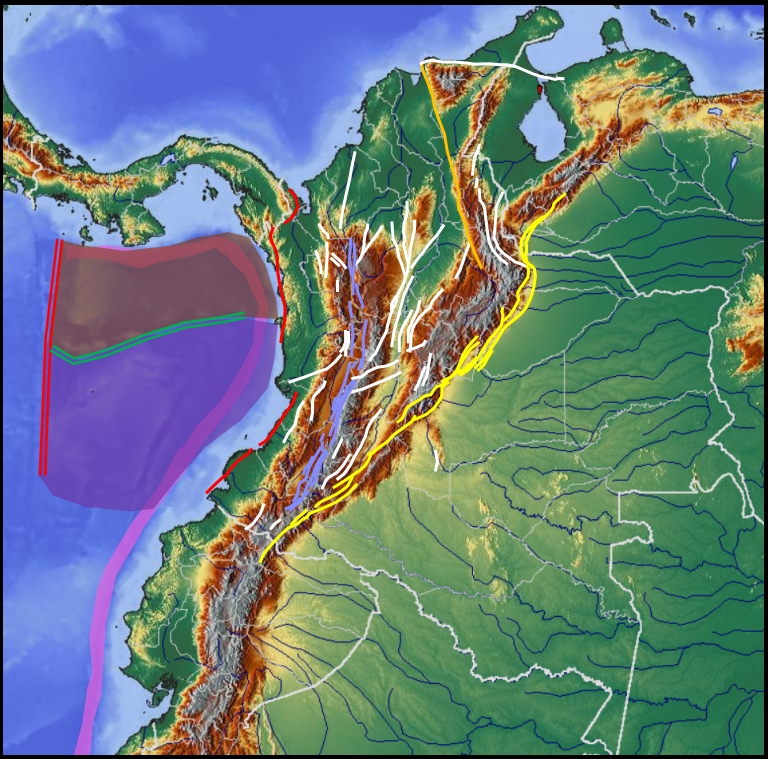
Coiba & Malpelo Plates

The country of Colombia spreads out over six tectonic plates, clockwise from north:

1. Caribbean Plate
2. North Andes Plate
3. South American Plate
4. Malpelo Plate
5. Coiba Plate
6. Panama Plate

The Llanos Basin is situated entirely on the South American Plate, bordering the North Andean Block or North Andean microplate in the west. The basin is one of three Colombian basins on the South American Plate, to the south the Caguán-Putumayo Basin and to the southeast the Vaupés-Amazonas Basin. The northern boundary of the Llanos Basin is formed by the Colombia-Venezuela border where the basin grades into the Barinas-Apure Basin on the Venezuelan side. The Catatumbo Basin, representing the Colombian portion of the larger Maracaibo Basin borders the Llanos Basin in the northwest and the western boundary is formed by the foothills (Piedemonte) of the Eastern Cordillera Basin, the sedimentary basin covering the Eastern Ranges of the Colombian Andes.

=== Tectonics ===
The basin is bound to the west by the Eastern Frontal Fault System, a 921.4 kilometres (572.5 mi) long fault system connecting the North Andes and South American Plates and thus the Eastern Cordillera Basin and the Llanos Basin. The fault system has an average strike of 042.1±19, but this orientation varies greatly along its course. The 1827, 1834, 1917, 1967, 1995, and 2008 earthquakes were all caused by fault movement as part of the system. The faults formed because of the convergence of two plates, leading to compressional stresses that form thrust complexes. The thrust complexes and continued compression would cause uplift that developed the Andes and the associated basin. The foreland development of the basin is associated with the Eastern Cordillera caused by compressional forces forming inland subsidence. The uplift caused isostatic subsidence that would lead to the evolution of the Llanos Basin. Because of the desequilibrium caused by the uplift, the erosion and deposition rates are amplified within the near Andes and Llanos Basin. The watershed was also affected by tectonics because of different erosion rates and change in landscape.

== Basin history ==
The tectonic history of the Llanos Basin, a foreland basin formed on top of Mesozoic rift basins, Paleozoic metasediments and Precambrian basement underlain by continental crust, goes back to the Early Jurassic.

The Andean orogeny, represented by the tectonic uplift of the Colombian Eastern Ranges and its northern extension, the Serranía del Perijá, caused tilting and uplift in the Llanos Basin. During the Andean orogenic phase, the paleotemperatures in the basin dropped considerably; in the Baja Guajira area from 115 °C (239 °F) in the Early Miocene to 70 °C (158 °F) in the Late Miocene. In the Late Miocene to Pliocene, the major faults to the southwest of the Cocinetas Basin, the Oca and Bucaramanga-Santa Marta Faults were tectonically active.

=== Basement ===
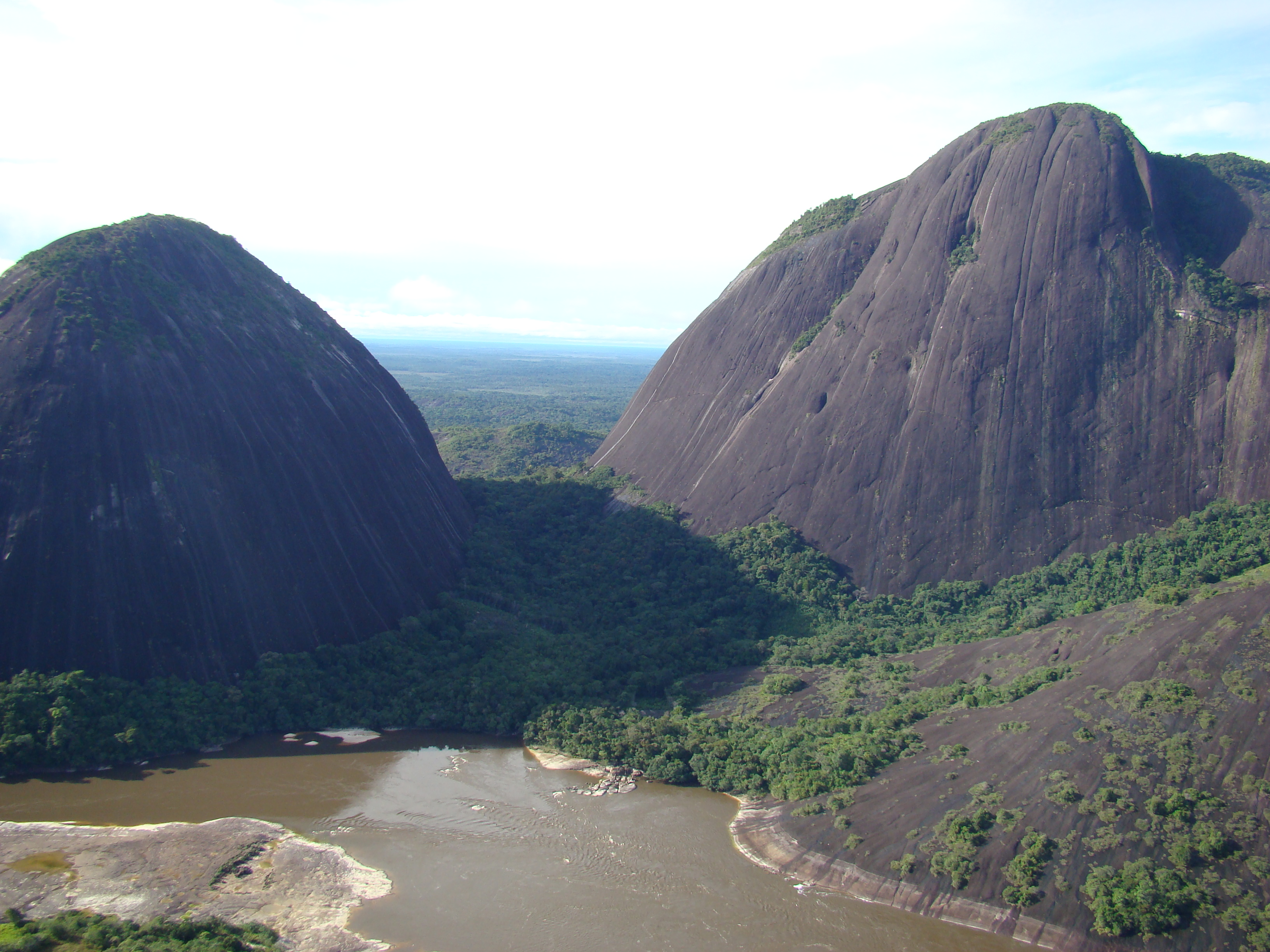
The Cerros de Mavecure in Guainía are a remnant of the Proterozoic basement underlying the Llanos Basin

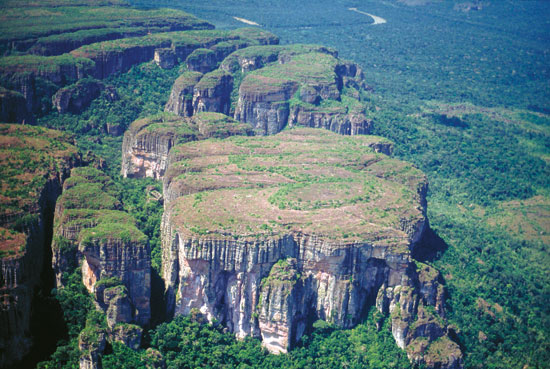
The Serranía de Chiribiquete in Guaviare

The stratigraphy of the Llanos Basin ranges, depending on the definition from either Jurassic or Paleozoic to recent. The basement is formed by the westernmost extensions of the Guiana Shield. Remnants of these Precambrian formations are found as inselbergs in the far east of Colombia (Cerros de Mavecure), in the Serranía de la Macarena to the southwest of the basin and in the tepuis of the Serranía de Chiribiquete to the southeast.

The Proterozoic crystalline rocks are overlain by metamorphosed sedimentary and igneous rocks ranging in age from Cambrian to Devonian. Younger and contemporaneous Paleozoic deposits are only found in the subsurface and in regional correlative units as the Floresta and Cuche Formations of the Altiplano Cundiboyacense to the direct northwest and the Río Cachirí Group of the Cesar-Ranchería Basin farther northwest of the Llanos Basin.

The units found in the Llanos Basin pertain to the Farallones Group and comprise the Valle del Guatiquía Red Beds, Pipiral Shale and the Gutiérrez Sandstone.

== Stratigraphy ==
Stratigraphy of the Llanos Basin and surrounding provinces
Ma	Age	Paleomap	Regional events	Catatumbo	Cordillera	proximal Llanos	distal Llanos	Putumayo	VSM	Environments	Maximum thickness	Petroleum geology	Notes
0.01	Holocene		Holocene volcanism Seismic activity	alluvium								Overburden	
1	Pleistocene		Pleistocene volcanism Andean orogeny 3 Glaciations	Guayabo	Soatá; Sabana	Necesidad	Guayabo	Gigante Neiva		Alluvial to fluvial (Guayabo)	550 m (1,800 ft) (Guayabo)	Overburden	
2.6	Pliocene		Pliocene volcanism Andean orogeny 3 GABI	Guayabo	Subachoque	Necesidad	Guayabo	Gigante Neiva		Alluvial to fluvial (Guayabo)	550 m (1,800 ft) (Guayabo)	Overburden	
5.3	Messinian		Andean orogeny 3 Foreland	Guayabo	Marichuela	Necesidad	Guayabo	Caimán	Honda	Alluvial to fluvial (Guayabo)	550 m (1,800 ft) (Guayabo)	Overburden	
13.5	Langhian		Regional flooding	León	hiatus	Caja	León	Caimán	Honda	Lacustrine (León)	400 m (1,300 ft) (León)	Seal	
16.2	Burdigalian		Miocene inundations Andean orogeny 2	C1	hiatus	Carbonera C1		Ospina	Honda	Proximal fluvio-deltaic (C1)	850 m (2,790 ft) (Carbonera)	Reservoir	
17.3	Burdigalian		Miocene inundations Andean orogeny 2	C2	hiatus	Carbonera C2		Ospina	Honda	Distal lacustrine-deltaic (C2)	850 m (2,790 ft) (Carbonera)	Seal	
19	Burdigalian		Miocene inundations Andean orogeny 2	C3	hiatus	Carbonera C3		Ospina	Honda	Proximal fluvio-deltaic (C3)	850 m (2,790 ft) (Carbonera)	Reservoir	
21	Early Miocene		Pebas wetlands	C4	hiatus	Carbonera C4		Ospina	Barzalosa	Distal fluvio-deltaic (C4)	850 m (2,790 ft) (Carbonera)	Seal	
23	Late Oligocene		Andean orogeny 1 Foredeep	C5	hiatus	Carbonera C5		Orito		Proximal fluvio-deltaic (C5)	850 m (2,790 ft) (Carbonera)	Reservoir	
25	Late Oligocene		Andean orogeny 1 Foredeep	C6	hiatus	Carbonera C6		Orito		Distal fluvio-lacustrine (C6)	850 m (2,790 ft) (Carbonera)	Seal	
28	Early Oligocene		Andean orogeny 1 Foredeep	C7	hiatus	C7		Pepino	Gualanday	Proximal deltaic-marine (C7)	850 m (2,790 ft) (Carbonera)	Reservoir	
32	Oligo-Eocene		Andean orogeny 1 Foredeep	C8	Usme	C8	onlap	Pepino	Gualanday	Marine-deltaic (C8)	850 m (2,790 ft) (Carbonera)	Seal; Source	
35	Late Eocene		Andean orogeny 1 Foredeep	Mirador	Usme	Mirador		Pepino	Gualanday	Coastal (Mirador)	240 m (790 ft) (Mirador)	Reservoir	
40	Middle Eocene		Andean orogeny 1 Foredeep	Mirador	Regadera	Mirador		Pepino	hiatus	Coastal (Mirador)	240 m (790 ft) (Mirador)	Reservoir	
45	Middle Eocene		Andean orogeny 1 Foredeep	Mirador	Regadera	Mirador		Pepino	hiatus	Coastal (Mirador)	240 m (790 ft) (Mirador)	Reservoir	
50	Early Eocene		Andean orogeny 1 Foredeep	Socha	Regadera	Los Cuervos		Pepino	hiatus	Deltaic (Los Cuervos)	260 m (850 ft) (Los Cuervos)	Seal; Source	
55	Late Paleocene		PETM; 2000 ppm CO_{2}	Los Cuervos	Bogotá	Los Cuervos		Pepino	Gualanday	Deltaic (Los Cuervos)	260 m (850 ft) (Los Cuervos)	Seal; Source	
60	Early Paleocene		SALMA	Barco	Guaduas	Barco		Rumiyaco	Gualanday	Fluvial (Barco)	225 m (738 ft) (Barco)	Reservoir	
65	Maastrichtian		KT extinction	Catatumbo	Guadalupe			Rumiyaco	Monserrate	Deltaic-fluvial (Guadalupe)	750 m (2,460 ft) (Guadalupe)	Reservoir	
72	Campanian		End of rifting	Colón-Mito Juan	Guadalupe			Rumiyaco	Monserrate	Deltaic-fluvial (Guadalupe)	750 m (2,460 ft) (Guadalupe)	Reservoir	
83	Santonian		End of rifting	Colón-Mito Juan	Guadalupe			Villeta/Güagüaquí		Deltaic-fluvial (Guadalupe)	750 m (2,460 ft) (Guadalupe)	Reservoir	
86	Coniacian		End of rifting	Colón-Mito Juan	Guadalupe			Villeta/Güagüaquí		Deltaic-fluvial (Guadalupe)	750 m (2,460 ft) (Guadalupe)	Reservoir	
89	Turonian		Cenomanian-Turonian anoxic event	La Luna	Chipaque	Gachetá	hiatus	Villeta/Güagüaquí		Restricted marine (all)	500 m (1,600 ft) (Gachetá)	Source	
93	Cenomanian		Rift 2	La Luna	Chipaque	Gachetá	hiatus	Villeta/Güagüaquí		Restricted marine (all)	500 m (1,600 ft) (Gachetá)	Source	
100	Albian		Rift 2	La Luna	Une	Une	hiatus	Caballos		Deltaic (Une)	500 m (1,600 ft) (Une)	Reservoir	
113	Aptian		Rift 2	Capacho	Fómeque	Une	hiatus	Motema	Yaví	Open marine (Fómeque)	800 m (2,600 ft) (Fómeque)	Source (Fóm)	
125	Barremian		High biodiversity	Aguardiente	Paja	Une	hiatus	Motema	Yaví	Shallow to open marine (Paja)	940 m (3,080 ft) (Paja)	Reservoir	
129	Hauterivian		Rift 1	Tibú- Mercedes	Las Juntas	hiatus	hiatus	Motema	Yaví	Deltaic (Las Juntas)	910 m (2,990 ft) (Las Juntas)	Reservoir (LJun)	
133	Valanginian		Rift 1	Río Negro	Cáqueza; Macanal; Rosablanca	hiatus	hiatus	Motema	Yaví	Restricted marine (Macanal)	2,935 m (9,629 ft) (Macanal)	Source (Mac)	
140	Berriasian		Rift 1	Girón	Cáqueza; Macanal; Rosablanca	hiatus	hiatus	Motema	Yaví	Restricted marine (Macanal)	2,935 m (9,629 ft) (Macanal)	Source (Mac)	
145	Tithonian		Break-up of Pangea	Jordán	Arcabuco	Buenavista Batá	hiatus	Saldaña		Alluvial, fluvial (Buenavista)	110 m (360 ft) (Buenavista)	"Jurassic"	
150	Early-Mid Jurassic		Passive margin 2	La Quinta	Montebel Noreán	hiatus	hiatus	Saldaña		Coastal tuff (La Quinta)	100 m (330 ft) (La Quinta)	"Jurassic"	
201	Late Triassic		Passive margin 2	Mucuchachi	Montebel Noreán	hiatus	hiatus	Payandé				"Jurassic"	
235	Early Triassic		Pangea		hiatus	hiatus	hiatus					"Paleozoic"	
250	Permian		Pangea		hiatus	hiatus	hiatus					"Paleozoic"	
300	Late Carboniferous		Famatinian orogeny		hiatus	hiatus	hiatus		Cerro Neiva ()			"Paleozoic"	
340	Early Carboniferous		Fossil fish Romer's gap		Cuche (355-385)	Farallones ()			Cerro Neiva ()	Deltaic, estuarine (Cuche)	900 m (3,000 ft) (Cuche)	"Paleozoic"	
360	Late Devonian		Passive margin 1	Río Cachirí (360-419)	Cuche (355-385)	Farallones ()			Ambicá ()	Alluvial-fluvial-reef (Farallones)	2,400 m (7,900 ft) (Farallones)	"Paleozoic"	
390	Early Devonian		High biodiversity	Floresta (387-400) El Tíbet					Ambicá ()	Shallow marine (Floresta)	600 m (2,000 ft) (Floresta)	"Paleozoic"	
410	Late Silurian		Silurian mystery	Floresta (387-400) El Tíbet								"Paleozoic"	
425	Early Silurian		Silurian mystery	hiatus								"Paleozoic"	
440	Late Ordovician		Rich fauna in Bolivia	San Pedro (450-490)		Duda ()						"Paleozoic"	
470	Early Ordovician		First fossils	San Pedro (450-490)	Busbanzá (>470±22) Chuscales Otengá	Guape ()		Río Nevado ()	Hígado () Agua Blanca; Venado (470-475)			"Paleozoic"	
488	Late Cambrian		Regional intrusions	Chicamocha (490-515)	Quetame ()	Ariarí ()		SJ del Guaviare (490-590)	San Isidro ()			"Paleozoic"	
515	Early Cambrian		Cambrian explosion		Quetame ()			SJ del Guaviare (490-590)	San Isidro ()			"Paleozoic"	
542	Ediacaran		Break-up of Rodinia		pre-Quetame		post-Parguaza	SJ del Guaviare (490-590)	El Barro ()	Yellow: allochthonous basement (Chibcha terrane); Green: autochthonous basement (Río Negro-Juruena Province)		Basement	
600	Neoproterozoic		Cariri Velhos orogeny	Bucaramanga (600-1400)	pre-Quetame		post-Parguaza	pre-Guaviare	El Barro ()	Yellow: allochthonous basement (Chibcha terrane); Green: autochthonous basement (Río Negro-Juruena Province)		Basement	
800	Neoproterozoic		Snowball Earth	Bucaramanga (600-1400)	pre-Quetame		post-Parguaza	pre-Guaviare	El Barro ()	Yellow: allochthonous basement (Chibcha terrane); Green: autochthonous basement (Río Negro-Juruena Province)		Basement	
1000	Mesoproterozoic		Sunsás orogeny	Bucaramanga (600-1400)	pre-Quetame	Ariarí (1000)	post-Parguaza	pre-Guaviare	La Urraca (1030-1100)	Yellow: allochthonous basement (Chibcha terrane); Green: autochthonous basement (Río Negro-Juruena Province)		Basement	
1300	Mesoproterozoic		Rondônia-Juruá orogeny	Bucaramanga (600-1400)	pre-Quetame	pre-Ariarí	Parguaza (1300-1400)	pre-Guaviare	Garzón (1180-1550)	Yellow: allochthonous basement (Chibcha terrane); Green: autochthonous basement (Río Negro-Juruena Province)		Basement	
1400	Mesoproterozoic		Rondônia-Juruá orogeny	pre-Bucaramanga	pre-Quetame	pre-Ariarí		pre-Guaviare	Garzón (1180-1550)	Yellow: allochthonous basement (Chibcha terrane); Green: autochthonous basement (Río Negro-Juruena Province)		Basement	
1600	Paleoproterozoic		Rondônia-Juruá orogeny	pre-Bucaramanga	pre-Quetame	pre-Ariarí	Maimachi (1500-1700)	pre-Guaviare	pre-Garzón	Yellow: allochthonous basement (Chibcha terrane); Green: autochthonous basement (Río Negro-Juruena Province)		Basement	
1800	Paleoproterozoic		Tapajós orogeny	pre-Bucaramanga	pre-Quetame	pre-Ariarí	Mitú (1800)	pre-Guaviare	pre-Garzón	Yellow: allochthonous basement (Chibcha terrane); Green: autochthonous basement (Río Negro-Juruena Province)		Basement	
1950	Paleoproterozoic		Transamazonic orogeny	pre-Bucaramanga	pre-Quetame	pre-Ariarí	pre-Mitú	pre-Guaviare	pre-Garzón	Yellow: allochthonous basement (Chibcha terrane); Green: autochthonous basement (Río Negro-Juruena Province)		Basement	
2200	Paleoproterozoic		Columbia	pre-Bucaramanga	pre-Quetame	pre-Ariarí	pre-Mitú	pre-Guaviare	pre-Garzón	Yellow: allochthonous basement (Chibcha terrane); Green: autochthonous basement (Río Negro-Juruena Province)		Basement	
2530	Archean		Carajas-Imataca orogeny	pre-Bucaramanga	pre-Quetame	pre-Ariarí	pre-Mitú	pre-Guaviare	pre-Garzón	Yellow: allochthonous basement (Chibcha terrane); Green: autochthonous basement (Río Negro-Juruena Province)		Basement	
3100	Archean		Kenorland	pre-Bucaramanga	pre-Quetame	pre-Ariarí	pre-Mitú	pre-Guaviare	pre-Garzón	Yellow: allochthonous basement (Chibcha terrane); Green: autochthonous basement (Río Negro-Juruena Province)		Basement	

Legend

- group
- important formation
- fossiliferous formation
- minor formation
- (age in Ma)
- proximal Llanos (Medina) (Note: based on Duarte et al. (2019), García González et al. (2009), and geological report of Villavicencio)
- distal Llanos (Saltarin 1A well) (Note: based on Duarte et al. (2019) and the hydrocarbon potential evaluation performed by the UIS and ANH in 2009)

=== Paleozoic ===
Cambro-Ordovician

- Guape Formation
- Duda Formation
- Ariarí Formation
- Ariarí Metagabbro

Pre-Devonian

- Quetame Group
  - Río Guamal Metasiltstones
  - Guayabetal Phyllites and Quartzites
  - San Cristóbal Quartzites and Phyllites
  - Susumuco Metaconglomerates and Phyllites

Devonian

- Farallones Group
  - Valle del Guatiquía Red Beds
  - Pipiral Shale
  - Gutiérrez Sandstone

==== Jurassic ====
- Buenavista Breccia

== Petroleum geology ==
The Llanos Basin is the most prolific hydrocarbon basin of Colombia, hosting well-known petroleum deposits as Caño Limón, Rubiales and other fields. Nine of the twenty most producing oil fields of Colombia are situated in the Llanos Basin.

=== Fields ===
Based on data released in March 2018, Colombia is the 21st oil producer in the world. Daily production dropped in 2017 to 854.121 thousand barrels per day (135.7944×10^{3} m^{3}/d). In 2016, twenty oilfields produced 66% of all oil of Colombia, listed below in bold. The total proven reserves of Colombia were 1,665.489 million barrels (264.7916×10^{6} m^{3}) in 2016.

Major oil fields in the Llanos Basin are:

Major oil and gas fields of the Llanos Basin
Name	Map	Location	Operator	Reservoirs	Reserves Production (2016)	Notes
**Rubiales**		Puerto Gaitán; Meta	Ecopetrol	Carbonera 7	4,380 million bbl (696 million m^{3}); 132.000 kbbl/d (20.9863×10^{3} m^{3}/d)	
**Castilla**		Castilla la Nueva; Meta	Ecopetrol	Mirador; Gachetá; Une	452 million bbl (71.9 million m^{3}); 121.363 kbbl/d (19.2952×10^{3} m^{3}/d)	
**Chichimene**		Acacias; Meta	Ecopetrol	Mirador; Guadalupe; Gachetá; Une	74.052 kbbl/d (11.7733×10^{3} m^{3}/d)	
**Quifa**		Puerto Gaitán; Meta	Meta Petroleum	Carbonera	613 million bbl (97.5 million m^{3}); 46.557 kbbl/d (7.4020×10^{3} m^{3}/d)	
**Caño Limón**		Puerto Rondón; Arauca	Ecopetrol		20.930 kbbl/d (3.3276×10^{3} m^{3}/d)	
**Avispa**		Cabuyaro; Meta	Pacific Rubiales		11.625 kbbl/d (1.8482×10^{3} m^{3}/d)	
**Ocelote**		Puerto Gaitán; Meta	Hocol		11.228 kbbl/d (1.7851×10^{3} m^{3}/d)	
**Chipirón**		Puerto Rondón; Arauca	OXY		10.459 kbbl/d (1.6628×10^{3} m^{3}/d)	
**Jacana**		Villanueva; Casanare	Geopark		7.477 kbbl/d (1.1887×10^{3} m^{3}/d)	
**Cupiagua**		Aguazul; Casanare	Ecopetrol		5.358 kbbl/d (851.9 m^{3}/d)	
Apiay		Villavicencio; Meta	Ecopetrol	Gachetá; Une		
Arauca		Arauca; Arauca	Ecopetrol			
Cusiana		Tauramena; Casanare	Ecopetrol	Mirador; Barco; Guadalupe		

- Other fields
  - Caño Verde
  - Chaparrito
  - Concesión
  - Corcel
  - Cravo Sur
  - La Gloria
  - Santiago
  - Trinidad
  - Valdivia

== Mining ==
Mining activities in the Llanos Basin are restricted to certain areas, resulting in less conflicts, more common with indigenous peoples in the Amazonian part of Colombia.

- gold
- halite
- coal

In San José del Guaviare platinum is mined.

Mining in the Llanos Basin and surrounding areas
Resources	Map	Department	Municipality	Mine	Notes
halite		Meta	Restrepo	Upín	
gold		Meta	Puerto Rico		
gold		Arauca	Arauca		
gold		Guaviare	San José del Guaviare		
platinum, iron, albite, andradite (var: melanite), 'apatite', arfvedsonite, 'biotite', calcite, cancrinite, epidote, fluorite, 'garnet', microcline, 'monazite', nepheline, siderite, titanite, zircon		Guaviare	San José del Guaviare		
coal		Casanare	Recetor		

== Paleontology ==
Major fossiliferous formations
Neogene
H = Honda Group
Co = Cocinetas Basin
Paleogene
B = Bogotá
C = Cerrejón
Cretaceous
L = La Frontera
P = Paja
Jurassic
J = Valle Alto
Devonian
F = Cuche and Floresta
Cambro-Ordovician
M = Duda, La Macarena

Compared to many fossiliferous formations in Colombia, the Llanos Basin has been lean in fossil content. Most of the basin stratigraphy is only known from wells.

Paleozoic outcrops surrounding and perforating the planar geography have provided fossils dating back to the Cambrian; the Duda and Ariarí Formations.

Several fossiliferous formations of contemporaneous depositional environments have provided many unique fossils indicative of paleoclimatic conditions; turtle fossils were described from Los Cuervos in the Cesar-Ranchería Basin, and the Mirador Formation in the Catatumbo Basin direct northwest of the Llanos Basin has provided many fossil flora.

Other correlative units with surrounding basins

- Guayabo - Sabana and Soatá, Ware, Honda
- León - Honda
- Carbonera - Barzalosa, Castilletes, Jimol
- Mirador - Bogotá - Etayoa
- Los Cuervos - Cerrejón - Titanoboa, crocodylians, turtles, flora
- Los Cuervos - Guaduas - fossil flora
- Gachetá - Chipaque - oysters
- Gachetá - La Luna - many
- Une - Hiló - ammonites
- Farallones Group - Floresta and Cuche

== See also ==
- Sedimentary basins of Colombia
  - Cesar-Ranchería Basin
  - Cocinetas Basin
  - Middle Magdalena Valley
- Neuquén Basin, major petroleum producing basin of Argentina
- Santos Basin, major petroleum producing basin of Brazil
- Eastern Venezuela Basin, primary petroleum producing basin of Venezuela

== Sources ==
=== Bibliography ===
==== General ====
- Barrero, Dario; Pardo, Andrés; Vargas, Carlos A.; Martínez, Juan F. (2007), Colombian Sedimentary Basins: Nomenclature, Boundaries and Petroleum Geology, a New Proposal, ANH, pp. 1–92
- García González, Mario; Mier Umaña, Ricardo; Cruz Guevara, Luis Enrique; Vásquez, Mauricio (2009), Informe Ejecutivo - evaluación del potencial hidrocarburífero de las cuencas colombianas, Universidad Industrial de Santander, pp. 1–219

==== Hydrodynamics ====
- Mora, Andrés; Gómez, Ricardo Andrés; Díaz, Camilo; Caballero, Victor; Parra, Mauricio; Villamizar, Carlos; Lasso, Álvaro; Ketcham, Richard A.; González Penagos, John Rico and Juan Pablo Arias Martínez, Felipe (2019), "Water flow, oil biodegradation, and hydrodynamic traps in the Llanos Basin, Colombia", AAPG Bulletin, 103 (5): 1225–1264, Bibcode:2019BAAPG.103.1225M, doi:10.1306/1003181611317237
- Duarte, Edward; Bayona, German; Jaramillo, Carlos; Parra, Mauricio; Romero, Ingrid; Mora, Josué Alejandro (2017), "Identificación de los máximos eventos de inundación marina Miocenos y su uso en la correlación y análisis de la cuenca de antepaís de los Llanos Orientales, Colombia", Boletín de Geología, 39: 19–40, doi:10.18273/revbol.v39n1-2017001
- Bartha, Attila; De Nicolais, Nelly; Sharma, Vinod; Roy, S.K.; Srivastava, Rajiv; Pomerantz, Andrew E.; Sanclemente, Milton; Pérez, Wilmar; Nelson, Christopher M. Reddy, Jonas Gros, J. Samuel Arey, Jaron Lelijveld, Sharad Dubey, Diego Tortella, Thomas Hantschel, Kenneth E. Peters and Oliver C. Mullins, Robert K. (2015), "Combined Petroleum System Modeling and Comprehensive Two-Dimensional Gas Chromatography To Improve Understanding of the Crude Oil Chemistry in the Llanos Basin, Colombia", Energy & Fuels, 29 (8): 4755–4767, doi:10.1021/acs.energyfuels.5b00529
- Gómez Galarza, Yohaney; Yoris, Franklin; Rodríguez, Javier; Portillo, Fredy; Araujo, Ysidro (2010), "Aspectos hidrodinámicos, estructurales y estratigráficos del Campo Rubiales" (PDF), Geo Petróleo, 9: 1–28
- Gómez, A.; Jaramillo, C.; Parra, M.; Mora, A. (2009), "Huesser Horizon: A lake and marine incursion in Northwestern South America during the Early Miocene", PALAIOS, 24 (4): 199–210, Bibcode:2009Palai..24..199G, doi:10.2110/palo.2007.p07-074r

==== Tectonics ====
- Paris, Gabriel; Machette, Michael N.; Dart, Richard L.; Haller, Kathleen M. (2000a), Map and Database of Quaternary Faults and Folds in Colombia and its Offshore Regions (PDF), USGS, pp. 1–66
- Paris, Gabriel; Machette, Michael N.; Dart, Richard L.; Haller, Kathleen M. (2000b), Map of Quaternary Faults and Folds of Colombia and Its Offshore Regions (PDF), USGS, p. 1

==== Petroleum ====
- Martínez Sánchez, Dilan; Jiménez, Giovanny (2019), "Hydraulic fracturing considerations: Insights from analogue models, and its viability in Colombia", Earth Sciences Research Journal, 23: 5–15, doi:10.15446/esrj.v23n1.69760 ISSN 1794-6190
- Vargas Jiménez, Carlos A (2012), "Evaluating total Yet-to-Find hydrocarbon volume in Colombia", Earth Sciences Research Journal, 16: 1–290
- Mojica, Jairo; Arévalo, Oscar J.; Castillo, Hardany (2009), Cuencas Catatumbo, Cesar – Ranchería, Cordillera Oriental, Llanos Orientales, Valle Medio y Superior del Magdalena (PDF), ANH, pp. 1–65
- Piedrahita, Carlos; Montaña, Clara L. (2007), "Methodology implemented for the 3D-Seismic modelling using GoCad and NORSAR 3D Software applied to complex areas in the Llanos foothills", Earth Sciences Research Journal, 11: 35–43
- Hernández Pardo, Orlando; von Frese, Ralph R.B.; Woo Kim, Jeong (2007), "Crustal thickness variations and seismicity of northwestern South America", Earth Sciences Research Journal, 11: 81–94
- N., N (2006), Cuenca Llanos Orientales - Estudio Integrado - Crudos Pesados (PDF), ANH, pp. 1–10

==== Paleontology ====
- Jaramillo, Carlos A.; Dilcher, D.L. (2001), "Middle Paleogene palynology of Central Colombia, South America: A study of pollen and spores from tropical latitudes", Palaeontographica Abteilung B, 258 (4–6): 87–213, Bibcode:2001PalAB.258...87J, doi:10.1127/palb/258/2001/87

==== Reports ====
- Pinto Valderrama, Jorge Eduardo; Mora Ortiz, José Pedro; Reátiga Tarazona, Gloria; Rey Pilonieta, Jorge Alberto; Toloza Hormiga, Silvia Johana; Torres Coronado, Diego Andrés; Vargas Mojica, David Ricardo; Zafra Manrique, Cristian Julián (2010), Geología del Piedemonte Llanero en la Cordillera Oriental, departamentos de Arauca y Casanare (PDF), INGEOMINAS & Universidad Industrial de Santander, pp. 1–64
- Terraza, Roberto; Montoya, Diana; Reyes, Germán; Moreno, Giovanni; Fúquen, Jaime; Torres Jaimes, Eliana; López Cardona, Myriam; Nivia Guevara, Álvaro; Etayo Serna, Fernando (2013), Geología de la Plancha 229 - Gachalá - 1:100,000 (PDF), Servicio Geológico Colombiano, pp. 1–296
- Patiño, Alejandro; Fuquen, Jaime; Ramos, Julián; Pedraza, Andrea; Ceballos, Leonardo; Pinzón, Lyda; Jerónimo, Yadira; Álvarez, Leidy; Torres, Andrea (2011), Cartografía geológica de la Plancha 247 - Cáqueza - 1:100,000 (PDF), INGEOMINAS
- Acosta, Jorge E.; Ulloa, Carlos E. (2002), Mapa geológico del Departamento de Cundinamarca 1:250,000 - Memoria Explicativa, INGEOMINAS, pp. 1–108
- Pulido, Orlando; Gómez, Luz Stella (2001), Geología de la Plancha 266 - Villavicencio - 1:100,000, INGEOMINAS, pp. 1–52

==== Maps ====
- ANH (2017), Mapa de Tierras (PDF), ANH, p. 1

Departmental

- Reyes, Germán; Cardozo, Ana Milena (1999), Mapa Geológico de Arauca 1:250,000, INGEOMINAS, p. 1
- Acosta, Jorge; Ulloa, Carlos; García, Pilar; Solano, Orlando (1999), Mapa Geológico de Cundinamarca, INGEOMINAS, p. 1
- Rodríguez, Antonio José (2002), Mapa Geológico del Meta 1:500,000, INGEOMINAS, p. 1

Local

- Fúquen, Jaime; Ceballos, Leonardo; Pedraza, Andrea; Marín, Edwin (2010), Plancha 99 - Villa del Rosario - 1:100,000 (PDF), INGEOMINAS, p. 1
- Royero, José María; Zambrano, J.; Daconte, Rommel; Mendoza, H.; Vargas, Rodrigo (1999), Plancha 111 - Toledo - 1:100,000, INGEOMINAS, p. 1
- Daconte B., Rommel; Salinas E, Rosalba (1982), Plancha 122 - Río Cobugón - 1:100,000 (PDF), INGEOMINAS, p. 1
- Vargas, Rodrigo; Arias, Alfonso; Jaramillo, Luis; Tellez, Noel (1984), Plancha 136 - Málaga - 1:100,000, INGEOMINAS, p. 1
- López, Carolina; Dávila, Camilo; González, Francisco; Parra, Eduardo; Chaquea, Claudia; Ojeda, Carolina; Q., Carlos; Espinel, Valentina; Lancheros, José A. (2011), Plancha 139 - Betoyes - 1:100,000, INGEOMINAS, p. 1
- López, Carolina; Dávila, Camilo; González, Francisco; Parra, Eduardo; Chaquea, Claudia; Ojeda, Carolina; Q., Carlos; Espinel, Valentina; Lancheros, José A. (2011), Plancha 155 - Puerto Rondón - 1:100,000, INGEOMINAS, p. 1
- Ulloa, Carlos E.; Rodríguez, Erasmo; Escovar, Ricardo (1998), Plancha 192 - Laguna de Tota - 1:100,000, INGEOMINAS, p. 1
- Terraza, Roberto; Moreno, Giovanni; Buitrago, José A.; Pérez, Adrián; Montoya, Diana María (2010), Plancha 210 - Guateque - 1:100,000, INGEOMINAS, p. 1
- Buitrago, José Alberto; Terraza M., Roberto; Etayo, Fernando (1998), Plancha 228 - Santafé de Bogotá Noreste - 1:100,000, INGEOMINAS, p. 1
- Ulloa, Carlos E; Escovar, Ricardo; Pacheco, Adolfo H. (2009), Plancha 230 - Monterrey - 1:100,000, INGEOMINAS, p. 1
- Acosta, Jorge; Calcedo, Juan Carlos; Ulloa, Carlos (1999), Plancha 265 - Icononzo - 1:100,000, INGEOMINAS, p. 1
- Pulido, Orlando; Gómez, Luz Stella; Marín, Pedro (1998), Plancha 266 - Villavicencio - 1:100,000, INGEOMINAS, p. 1
- Duarte, Rafael; Moreno, Mauricio; Morales, Carlos Julio; Villegas, Henry; Alvarado, Sonia; Téllez, Milena; Pacheco, Sonia; Rojas, Nadia (2010), Plancha 267 - Pachaquiaro - 1:100,000, INGEOMINAS, p. 1
- Unión Temporal, G&H (2015), Plancha 284 - Santana - 1:100,000 (PDF), Servicio Geológico Colombiano, p. 1
