= Caño Limón–Coveñas pipeline =

Crude oil pipeline in Colombia

Caño Limón – Coveñas pipeline

Location
- Country: Colombia
- Province: Arauca Department, Boyacá Department, Norte de Santander Department, Sucre Department
- Start: Caño Limón oilfield
- To: Coveñas

General information
- Type: crude oil
- Owner: Ecopetrol, Occidental Petroleum
- Commissioned: 1986

Technical information
- Length: 780 km (480 mi)
- Maximum discharge: 0.225 million barrels per day (~1.12×10^{7} t/a)

The Caño Limón – Coveñas pipeline is a crude oil pipeline in Colombia from the Caño Limón oilfield in the municipalities of Arauca and Arauquita in Arauca Department on the border of Venezuela to Coveñas on Colombia's Caribbean coastline. It is jointly owned by the state oil firm Ecopetrol, and U.S. company Occidental Petroleum. The pipeline is 780 kilometres (480 mi) long.

== History ==
The pipeline was opened in 1986. During its existence, the pipeline has often been attacked by guerrilla organizations that oppose the Colombian government. The National Liberation Army (ELN), which has traditionally been involved in such attacks, charged in a communique that "in our country, energy policy does not prioritize investment (in Colombia) but rather exploitation and consumption that sacrifices future generations." Together with the FARC, they have repeatedly sabotaged and exploded sections of the pipeline.

The Colombian government has militarized the area in response. For several years a security tax was imposed on oil producers in the region, which have also been targeted by guerrilla extortion and kidnappings. Occidental Petroleum also contracted the security firm AirScan to aid the Colombian military in the defense of its operations.

Attacks on Oil Pipelines, 2001-2004
	2001	2002	2003	2004
All pipelines	263	74	179	103
Caño Limón Coveñas	170	41	34	17
Source: Ministry of Defense, Government of Colombia.

In 2001, there were 170 attacks on the pipeline. The pipeline was out of operation for 266 days of that year. The government estimates that these bombings potentially reduced the GDP of Colombia by 0.5%. Occidental Petroleum lobbied and testified for increased American involvement in protecting the pipeline. The government of the United States increased military aid by $98 million, in 2003, to Colombia to assist in the effort to defend the pipeline. Attacks on the pipeline have subsequently been reduced during the following years.

In 1998, AirScan misidentified the village of Santo Domingo as a hostile guerrilla target, leading to a December 18 cluster bomb attack by the Colombian military which killed eighteen civilians, including nine children. The incident led to different legal actions against all the parties involved, some of which are still in progress.

== See also ==
- Guahibo people
- U'wa people
- Plan Colombia
- Ocensa pipeline

== Sources ==
- Project Underground, "Blood of Our Mother", August 1998.
- Douglass W. Cassel Jr., "A CORPORATE COVER-UP?, Chicago Daily Law Bulletin, January 9, 2003.
- American Friends Service Committee, U.S. Military Aid and Oil Interests in Colombia.
- T. Christian Miller, A Colombian Village Caught in a Cross-Fire, Los Angeles Times, March 17, 2002.
- Bill Weinberg, STATE OF SIEGE IN ARAUCA: Indigenous Peoples, Civil Society Under Attack in Colombia's Oil Zone.
