= Narciso Matus Torres =

Colombian politician

Narciso Matus Torres (1934–1987) was a Colombian politician. He was born in Arauquita (Arauca) in 1934. He studied at the José Joaquín Ortiz School, and obtained a law degree from the Universidad Externado de Colombia in 1959. Matus Torres was a leader of the popular conservative movement in the Department of Meta, and served in various capacities. He was mayor of Villavicencio, as well as commissioner, councillor, chamber representative and assembly deputy. He served as governor of Meta province (1982–83) by presidential decree. He was also a leader of the National Federation of Cocoa Farmers.

He was assassinated on March 18, 1987, when two individuals in a Ford pickup truck shot him that evening. His death was mourned by more than 40,000 farmers (llaneros). He was married to Mary Esperanza Díaz Matus, with whom he had five children: Narciso Eduardo, Luz Esperanza, María Josefina, José Luis and Francisco Jacobo. A building in UniMeta and a college in Villavicencio is named after him.
