= AirScan =

American private Military Company

AirScan, Inc. is an American private military company that specializes in airborne surveillance and security.

== History ==
AirScan Inc. was formed in 1984 by former US Air Commandos Walter Holloway and John Mansur with high standards of recruitment. They have been specializing in airborne surveillance, security operations, surveillance systems, wildlife surveys and training since 1989. They are one of the few companies able to operate unmanned aerial vehicles. They most recently won a $10 million contract from the Coalition Provisional Authority to provide aerial surveillance of the pipelines protected by Erinys International Ltd. They are rather secretive about many of their operations, choosing to remain vague, citing privacy, and speak mostly about their infrared deer surveys and polar bear trackings.

== Colombia ==
On December 13, 1998, AirScan misidentified the village of Santo Domingo as a hostile guerrilla target, leading to a cluster bomb attack by Colombian Air Force units which killed eighteen civilians, including nine children. While the AirScan aircraft was in the vicinity, and deserved the action by the Colombian Air Force they were not involved in the operation. Three employees of AirScan were flying the Skymaster plane from which they provided the Colombian military with the coordinates to drop the bombs. The operation had been planned at Occidental's complex in Caño Limón by the CAF and AirScan.

AirScan is one of the named defendants in the lawsuit Galvis Mujica v. Occidental Petroleum, et al. filed April 23, 2003, in the US District Court in Los Angeles. The suit was filed by the Washington, D.C.–based International Labor Rights Fund and is based on the Alien Tort Claims Act. The AirScan employees, Arthur McClintock, Jose Orta, and Charlie Denny have disappeared and their location remains unknown. The Coast Guard is investigating whether Orta, who was allegedly flying the plane, was a military officer on active duty at the Coast Guard at the time. AirScan has denied any responsibility for the events.

United States Representative Jan Schakowsky's letter to Colin Powell in November 2002 requested he decertify the Colombian Air Force's 1st Combat Command, located at Palanquero airbase, and so that the elements involved in the Santo Domingo attack may stop receiving United States funding. United States Ambassador Anne W. Patterson had recommended this action as well and in the summer of 2004, Secretary of State Powell did decertify the unit. He is, however, still reluctant to support finding the three pilots, as Representative Schakowsky had also requested.

== Africa ==
AirScan has been implicated in running Pentagon weapons to counter-insurgency operations in Uganda, as well as to rebels in the Sudan fighting the Khartoum regime. AirScan was hired by the MPLA government of Angola in late 1997 to provide surveillance of the mostly Chevron owned oil installations in the Cabinda region, a region Angola had just weeks earlier led an offensive from into the Congo. The MPLA had several firms hired in the region including Defence Systems Limited and MPRI, who had been set receive the contract but pulled out at the last moment. The timing and location of hiring AirScan leads some to believe these firms are providing covert training and assistance in oil wealthy areas of Africa. Brigadier General Joe Stringham, a founding member of AirScan and in charge of operations in Cabinda was responsible for many covert counter-insurgency activities in El Salvador during their dirty war in the 1980s.

== Former Yugoslavia ==
AirScan was also implicated in air surveillance operations over Macedonia as part of a contract in support of NATO interference in the civil war in former Yugoslavia. AirScan operated a Cessna 337H Skymaster registered N729AS (c/n33701938) fitted with special equipment including a FLIR ball under the port (left) wing and a weather radar under the starboard wing. At least a part of the "take" of AirScan flights was transmitted through the commercial Telstar 11 satellite TV relay, along other imagery gathered by US Army and US Navy surveillance units. That surveillance was used to monitor terrorist activities, to keep suspects in sight and for counter-trafficking operations support. The broadcasts through channels of Telstar 11 were not enciphered, as it was discovered by a British citizen, John Locker, late 2001.

== See also ==
- ISTAR
