= Miguel Matus Caile =

Colombian writer, politician and historian (1928–2001)

Miguel Antonio Matus Caile was a Colombian writer, politician and historian. He was born in Arauquita, Arauca in 1928 and died in the city of Arauca in 2001. He came from a family of Lebanese immigrants that exerted a strong influence on the social and political life of the departments of Arauca and Meta. One of his brothers, Elías Matus, became a Senator of the Republic of Colombia, and a nephew, Jacobo Matus, was a leading politician who ran for the governorship of Meta.

Matus Caile himself served in a variety of public roles in Arauca. He was Secretary of Agriculture and Public Works and between 1980 and 1982 he was National Intendant of Arauca. He was founder and president for life of the Academia de Historia de Arauca, and a member of the Academia de Historia de Colombia. He was a prolific writer, his works focused primarily on the history of his native region, e.g. Historia de Arauca and Arauca y su sector agropecuario.

== Works ==
- Historia de Arauca
- Huellas de una Civilización
- Arauca y su Sector Agropecuario
- Arauca en la Gesta Libertadora
- Leyendas del Alto y Bajo Arauca
- El Veguero Julián
- Inspiración
- Genialidad Literaria
- Simón Bolívar
- Fray Ignacio Mariño, Capellán del Ejército Libertador
- Departamento de Arauca
- La Negrera
- Acontecer de un Romance
- Santander en los Llanos
- La Iglesia Católica en Arauca
- Disertaciones de un Académico
- Arauca, orientación turística
