= Transandean =

Transandean (Spanish: Transandino) may refer to things relative to:

- Argentina (Chilean usage)
- Chile (Argentine usage)
- Peru
- Bolivia

The term is also used to name some infrastructure that crosses the Andes like the:

- Trans-Andean railways

- Transandine Railway, Argentina and Chile

- Trans-Andean Highway, Venezuela
- Transandino pipeline, Colombia
