= Yuvelis Morales Blanco =

Colombian environmental activist and Goldman Prize winner

- Born: 2001 (age 24–25); Puerto Wilches, Colombia
- Occupation: Environmental activist
- Awards: Goldman Environmental Prize 2026

Yuvelis Natalia Morales Blanco (born 2001) is a Colombian environmental and anti-fracking activist known for her work protecting the Magdalena River from fracking and oil drilling. She received death threats and was frequently attacked for her anti-fracking advocacy. She received the 2026 Goldman Prize for South and Central America.

== Biography ==
Morales Blanco was born and raised in an Afro-Colombian community in Puerto Wilches, along the banks of the Magdalena River. Her parents were subsistence fisherman, and from a young age she became worried about oil spills, as they resulted in a lack of food for her and her family.

She became an activist in 2018 after the Lisama 158 oil spill, which caused massive fish die-offs and forced many families to relocate. She left her studies to start fighting against fracking, which state-owned oil company Ecopetrol was beginning to pilot, starting by going door to door as part of a group. She frequently participated in protests, and rose to national attention for her speech at a public hearing against fracking in January 2021.

That same evening, a man came up to her and threatened to kill her. As her activism continued, the danger she was in also continued to rise. She fled to Bogotá for a short time to escape, but decided to return to Puerto Wilches. Then, after being pursued by armed men, she fled to France, where she spent much of 2022 before returning home to Puerto Wilches. During this time, she was a Marianne Laureate.

She became a symbol of the fight against fracking after her high-profile exile, and soon both courts and politicians such as President Gustavo Petro stopped fracking from occurring. Since then, she has become a noted international anti-fracking activist, advocating against fracking in countries including France and Mexico, and serves as a judge of the nonbinding, advisory International Rights of Nature Tribunal.

She was awarded the Goldman Prize, known as the Green Nobel, for South and Central America in 2026, at the age of 25. She was part of the first ever all-female group of Goldman recipients.
