= Rubiales oil field =

Oil field in Colombia

Rubiales Oil Field
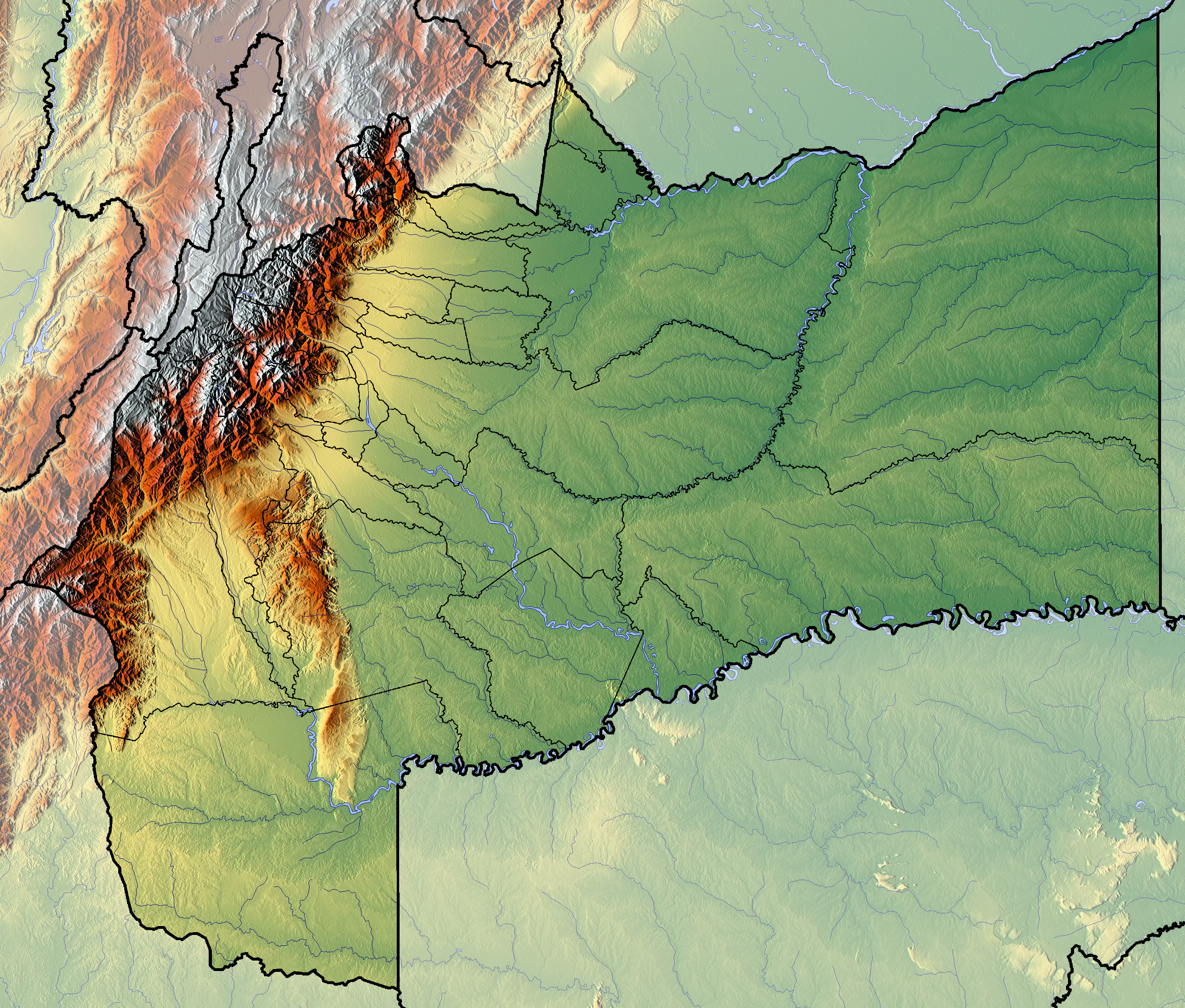
- Location of Rubiales Oil Field Rubiales oil field (Colombia)
- Country: Colombia
- Region: Meta Department
- Location: Puerto Gaitán
- Offshore/onshore: Onshore
- Coordinates: 3°46′02.2″N 71°23′16.3″W
- Operator: Ecopetrol (since July 2016); Pacific Rubiales Energy (until July 1, 2016)

Field history
- Discovery: 1981
- Start of development: 1988
- Start of production: 1992

Production
- Current production of oil: 132,000 barrels per day (~7.48×10^{6} t/a)
- Estimated oil in place: 588 million tonnes (~ 696×10^{6} m^{3} or 4380 million bbl)
- Producing formations: C7

The Rubiales Oil Field is an oil field located in the Llanos Basin, Meta Department, Colombia. It was discovered in 1981 and was first developed, operated and owned by Pacific Rubiales Energy. The field produces heavy oil (11.3-14.5° API gravity) from the C7 unit of the Carbonera Formation. The porosity of the reservoir formation is between 28 and 33% and the permeability ranges from 3 to 5 Darcies. In 2008, 22.817.163 barrels were produced from the field. The total proven reserves of the Rubiales oil field are 4.38 billion barrels (588 million tonnes), and production in 2017 is 132,000 barrels per day (21,000 m^{3}/d).

== Change of operator ==
Since July 1, 2016, the field is operated by Ecopetrol. It is the most productive field of the country.
