= Puerto Wilches =

Coordinates: 7°21′N 73°54′W

- Municipality and town
- Flag

- Location of the municipality and town of Puerto Wilches in the Santander Department of Colombia
- Country: Colombia
- Department: Santander Department

Area
  - Total: 1,588 km^{2} (613 sq mi)

Population (Census 2018)
  - Total: 31,698
  - Density: 19.96/km^{2} (51.70/sq mi)
- Demonym: Wilchenses
- Time zone: UTC-5 (Colombia Standard Time)
- Website: www.puertowilches-santander.gov.co

Puerto Wilches is a town and municipality in the Santander Department in northeastern Colombia.

== History ==
The port of Puerto Wilches was established principally as a fluvial port for the Puerto Wilches railway. The function of the railway and port was to link the department of Santander and the city of Bucaramanga with the world economy by way of fluvial navigation on the Magdalena River on to the caribbean port city of Barranquilla.

The original construction of the railway was via a British company named the Great Northern Railway of Colombia Company Ltd. The company was floated in London in April 1907. The company was authorised by Rafael Reyes's government to float £518,400 of bonds for the first 54 km of the line between Puerto Wilches and Bucaramanga.

The project was initially a success but political opposition to the use of bonds guaranteed by the national government formed within the national political elite and the project was sabotaged by publications in the European press spreading rumours the government had not authorised bonds to be raised in its name. This resulted in problems raising additional capital. Subsequent bonds were heavily devalued and the company did not receive sufficient capital to fund the line. Following repeated disputes with Colombian authorities the company went into liquidation and the concession was bought out by the government in April 1918. A significant proportion of the railway was not completed until 1926 when the 95 km point was reached resulting in stimulation of trade in the surrounding region.

The existence of the railway infrastructure and the status as a fluvial port stimulated urban growth, but shifting to use of road transportation away from railways led to a lesser economic importance of the port. In recent times the importance of the oil industry in the region has led to renewed importance in the regional economy.

Notable residents include Yuvelis Morales Blanco.

== Climate ==
Climate data for Puerto Wilches (Brisas Las Hda), elevation 138 m (453 ft), (1981–2010)
Month	Jan	Feb	Mar	Apr	May	Jun	Jul	Aug	Sep	Oct	Nov	Dec	Year
Mean daily maximum °C (°F)	34.5 (94.1)	35.1 (95.2)	34.4 (93.9)	33.9 (93.0)	33.7 (92.7)	33.8 (92.8)	34.2 (93.6)	34.2 (93.6)	33.5 (92.3)	33.1 (91.6)	33.0 (91.4)	33.5 (92.3)	33.9 (93.0)
Daily mean °C (°F)	29.0 (84.2)	29.4 (84.9)	29.0 (84.2)	28.8 (83.8)	28.7 (83.7)	28.8 (83.8)	28.8 (83.8)	28.9 (84.0)	28.5 (83.3)	28.3 (82.9)	28.3 (82.9)	28.5 (83.3)	28.7 (83.7)
Mean daily minimum °C (°F)	20.6 (69.1)	20.9 (69.6)	21.1 (70.0)	21.1 (70.0)	21.0 (69.8)	21.2 (70.2)	21.1 (70.0)	21.0 (69.8)	20.8 (69.4)	20.8 (69.4)	20.9 (69.6)	20.8 (69.4)	21.0 (69.8)
Average precipitation mm (inches)	47.7 (1.88)	77.6 (3.06)	177.4 (6.98)	290.9 (11.45)	389.3 (15.33)	305.7 (12.04)	281.1 (11.07)	313.3 (12.33)	344.6 (13.57)	390.5 (15.37)	254.3 (10.01)	120.8 (4.76)	2,993.4 (117.85)
Average precipitation days	4	6	11	15	18	15	14	16	18	18	14	7	155
Average relative humidity (%)	77	76	77	78	78	78	77	77	78	79	79	79	78
Source: Instituto de Hidrologia Meteorologia y Estudios Ambientales
