= Arauquita =

Coordinates: 7.03028°N 71.4356°W

- Municipality and town
- Flag

- Location of the municipality and town of Arauquita in the Arauca Department of Colombia
- Country: Colombia
- Department: Arauca Department

Area
  - Municipality and town: 3,047 km^{2} (1,176 sq mi)
  - Urban: 2.31 km^{2} (0.89 sq mi)

Population (2020 est.)
  - Municipality and town: 56,209
  - Density: 18.45/km^{2} (47.78/sq mi)
  - Urban: 15,678
  - Urban density: 6,790/km^{2} (17,600/sq mi)
- Time zone: UTC-5 (Colombia Standard Time)
- Climate: Am

Arauquita is a town and municipality in the Arauca Department, Colombia. As of 2020, the municipality has a population of 56,209.

Miguel Matus Caile, the politician and historian, was born in Arauquita.
