= Erinys International =

British private security company

- Industry: private security
- Founded: 2001
- Founder: Jonathan Garratt
- Website: www.erinys.net

Erinys International is a British private security company registered in the British Virgin Islands. The Group operational HQ is in Dubai, UAE and other offices are in Andover, Hampshire (Erinys UK Ltd) and Johannesburg (Erinys South Africa Ltd).

Erinys International has subsidiaries in the UK, South Africa, Democratic Republic of Congo and Republic of Congo and associated companies in Iraq and Nigeria.

Erinys Group companies provide security and support (for example: communications and logistics) services for personnel and assets, except for Erinys South Africa, which specialises in the provision of ongoing and ad hoc risk evaluations of countries and projects particularly in Africa.

== Staff ==
Erinys International was founded by Jonathan Garratt (a retired British Army officer) in 2001. In 2002, Erinys South Africa was formed after acquisition of the risk assessment business of Strategic Concepts Pty Ltd, a company formed by Sean Cleary (a former South African diplomat), who was a director of Erinys International until he resigned in 2003 after the company secured its first contract in Iraq.

The Group hired Alistair Morrison OBE MC in early 2003 until his departure in March 2004 to take up a senior position in Kroll. Alastair rejoined the Executive Board in December 2008.

== Iraq ==
Erinys Iraq Ltd was registered in BVI in August 2003 (and subsequently in Iraq) and was granted a contract by the Coalition Provisional Authority to recruit and train an Oil Protection Force (OPF) for the Iraq Ministry of Oil. Initially the requirement was for 6,500 personnel to guard designated pipelines and installations, but this grew over the period of the contract to reach 16,000 Iraqi staff guarding 282 locations and included an aerial surveillance capability. The OPF contract ended in December 2004 with the transfer of the Force and its assets to the Ministry of Oil. An account of the OPF is available at www.erinys.net

Other significant contracts in Iraq included the provision of reconstruction security and support services to the US Army Corps of Engineers (USACE) Gulf Region Division (GRD). The principal role of Erinys support to the GRD mission across Iraq was to provide security escort services for civilian personnel whose role was to monitor reconstruction projects in Iraq. Erinys also furnished the GRD with a nationwide radio communications network and specialist security survey and assessment services.

=== Controversy ===
Erinys was at the centre of a row in 2004 when it emerged that its employees had mistreated a prisoner whilst in their custody. Photos supplied to the British newspaper The Observer revealed that the 16-year-old Iraqi youth they were interrogating in a garage in Kirkuk had been restrained with six car tyres around his body. The boy looked to be frozen in fear in a room riddled with bullet holes. The newspaper was also told that the prisoner had been denied food and water for 24 hours. Erinys denied the allegations, saying that the boy was released unharmed after minutes to his father. One of the employees pictured in the photo however was later suspended from duty.

== Waking the Dead ==
In April 2005, the BBC television series Waking the Dead aired an episode entitled "Duty and Honour" which featured a character named John Garrett. The fictional Garrett was a former British Army officer who left to set up a private security company. In May 2008 the BBC issued an apology, clarifying that the murderer and war criminal featured in the show was entirely fictional and not intended to bear any resemblance to the real Jonathan Garratt and that his company was not in any way based on Erinys International.
