= Transandino pipeline =

Crude oil pipeline in Colombia

- Location of Transandino pipeline

Location
- Country: Colombia
- Start: Orito, Department of Putumayo
- To: Tumaco, Department of Nariño

General information
- Type: oil
- Operator: Ecopetrol
- Commissioned: 1969

Technical information
- Length: 305 km (190 mi)
- Maximum discharge: 190,000 barrels per day (30,000 m^{3}/d)

The Transandino pipeline is a 305-kilometre-long (190 mi) crude oil pipeline, which transports oil from Orito, in the Department of Putumayo, to the Pacific port of Tumaco in the Department of Nariño, Colombia. The pipeline was built in 1969 with diameters of 10 inches (250 mm), 14 inches (360 mm) and 18 inches (460 mm). There are four pump stations and four reduce pressure stations. The pipeline has the capacity of 190,000 barrels per day (30,000 m^{3}/d). It is operated by Ecopetrol.
