= Vaupés Arch =

The Vaupés Arch is a hydrographic feature in the geology of Colombia. The Vaupés Arch forms the major drainage divide in the southern extent of the Llanos region of eastern Colombia and the western slopes of the Guiana Shield in Venezuela. The Vaupés Arch is the result of an episode of tectonic uplift that occurred approximately 8 to 10 Ma. The rise of the Vaupés Arch divided the basin of the Amazon from the headwaters of the Orinoco for the first time. Much of the Arch is now buried under thick sediments washed from the Andes. Shifting meanders of the area's numerous waterways have spread these sediments evenly over the flat alluvial plain, which has very little relief. In modern times the Casiquiare canal, to the south of the Arch, reconnects the two headwater basins, the Upper Orinoco and the Upper Rio Negro, a major Amazon tributary.

== See also ==
- Geology of Colombia
