= Caño Limón oilfield =

Oil field in Arauca Department, Colombia

- Country: Colombia
- Region: Arauca Department
- Location: Llanos Basin
- Offshore/onshore: onshore
- Partners: Ecopetrol, Occidental Petroleum

Field history
- Discovery: 1983
- Start of production: 1986

Production
- Current production of oil: 73,000 barrels per day (~3.6×10^{6} t/a)

The Caño Limón oilfield is an oil field crude oil in Arauca Department, Colombia. It is Colombia's second-largest oil field.

== History ==
The Caño Limón oilfield was discovered in July 1983 by Occidental Petroleum. Oil extraction operations began in 1986.

== Geology ==
The Llanos basin is located east of the Eastern Cordillera (Andes) in Colombia. The bulk of the oil is found in deltaic sands of Eocene Mirador and the Upper Cretaceous formation. The average API gravity of oil is 29.5°.

== Production ==
The oil field is jointly owned by the state oil firm Ecopetrol, and Occidental Petroleum. The produced crude oil is transported by the Caño Limón – Coveñas pipeline to Colombia's Caribbean coastline.

== Environmental issues ==
The National Institute of Renewable Natural Resources and Environment repeatedly criticized the operation. In 1988, it found that the operators had taken inadequate steps to prevent environmental damage. Later in 1992, it conducted water sampling studies that found high concentrations of heavy metals and polycyclic aromatic hydrocarbons. It found that "because of the polluting effluents from Caño Limón, the receiving rivers and lakes are no longer fit for human consumption."
