= Puerto Gaitán =

Coordinates: 4.31417°N 72.0825°W

- Municipality and town
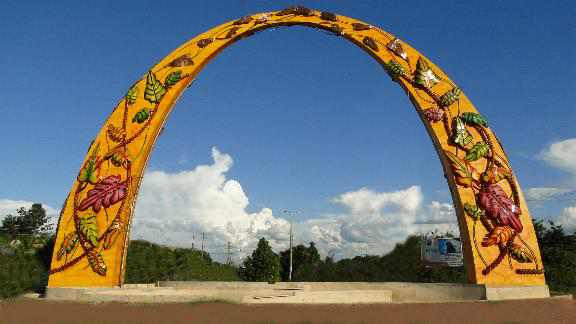

- Flag Coat of arms

- Location of the municipality and town of Puerto Gaitán in the Meta Department of Colombia.
- Country: Colombia
- Department: Meta Department

Area
  - Municipality and town: 17,250 km^{2} (6,660 sq mi)
  - Urban: 2.63 km^{2} (1.02 sq mi)
- Elevation: 149 m (489 ft)

Population (2018 census)
  - Municipality and town: 41,513
  - Density: 2.407/km^{2} (6.233/sq mi)
  - Urban: 20,659
  - Urban density: 7,860/km^{2} (20,300/sq mi)
- Time zone: UTC-5 (Colombia Standard Time)
- Climate: Aw

Puerto Gaitán (Spanish pronunciation: [ˈpweɾto ɣajˈtan]) is a town and municipality in the Meta Department, Colombia.

== History ==
Puerto Gaitán was founded on February 11, 1932, when Venezuelan merchants: Pedro Capella, Ventura Alvarado and Concepción Izanoboco arrived on the banks of the Manacacías River and settled there before the announcement of the provision of a ferry or ferryboat from the Manacacías River to achieve transit between Puerto Carreño and Villavicencio.

In this first point there was quite a lot of "majaguillo" tree, which gave it the name of majaguillal, until 1960 when it was elevated to the category of Police Inspection of the municipality of Puerto López and was called Manacacías.

On November 29, 1969, the Departmental Assembly of Meta erected this population as a municipality with the name of Puerto Gaitán, in honor of the liberal leader Jorge Eliécer Gaitán.

== Geography ==
=== Location ===
Pto Gaitan is a municipality located in the department of Meta. It includes an extensive area of flat structure known as the Savannahs of the Altillanura, whose main articulating axis is the Meta River.

The Municipality is an irregular rectangle circumscribed by the Meta River to the north, the Manacacias River and the Yucao River to the west, the Iteviare River to the south and a straight line to the East. It forms the extreme north-east of the Department of Meta, being the most distant Municipality from the departmental capital city Villavicencio.

=== Hydrography ===
Rivers Manacacias, Meta, Yucao, Planas, Muco, Guarrojo, Tillaba, and Uva.

=== Climate ===
Puerto Gaitán has a tropical monsoon climate (Köppen Am) in common with most of the Colombian Llanos. Temperatures are very warm to hot and oppressively humid throughout the year, although in the long wet season from March to November heavy cloud cover and rain does depress temperatures a little.

Climate data for Puerto Gaitán (Carimagua), elevation 200 m (660 ft), (1971–2000)
Month	Jan	Feb	Mar	Apr	May	Jun	Jul	Aug	Sep	Oct	Nov	Dec	Year
Mean daily maximum °C (°F)	32.5 (90.5)	33.9 (93.0)	33.6 (92.5)	31.9 (89.4)	30.7 (87.3)	29.5 (85.1)	29.4 (84.9)	30.1 (86.2)	30.7 (87.3)	31.2 (88.2)	31.1 (88.0)	31.3 (88.3)	31.3 (88.3)
Daily mean °C (°F)	27.0 (80.6)	27.8 (82.0)	27.9 (82.2)	26.5 (79.7)	25.5 (77.9)	24.8 (76.6)	24.6 (76.3)	24.9 (76.8)	25.5 (77.9)	25.9 (78.6)	26.4 (79.5)	26.5 (79.7)	26.1 (79.0)
Mean daily minimum °C (°F)	21.6 (70.9)	22.2 (72.0)	22.8 (73.0)	22.8 (73.0)	22.3 (72.1)	22.1 (71.8)	21.6 (70.9)	21.7 (71.1)	21.9 (71.4)	22.3 (72.1)	22.5 (72.5)	22.0 (71.6)	22.1 (71.8)
Average rainfall mm (inches)	13.9 (0.55)	45.6 (1.80)	93.2 (3.67)	244.5 (9.63)	320.8 (12.63)	397.5 (15.65)	328.0 (12.91)	255.2 (10.05)	276.1 (10.87)	245.1 (9.65)	137.3 (5.41)	50.5 (1.99)	2,407.7 (94.79)
Average rainy days	3	4	8	17	22	23	23	21	19	17	11	5	172
Average relative humidity (%)	71	68	72	81	86	88	87	86	85	83	81	77	80
Mean monthly sunshine hours	257.3	206.3	173.6	135.0	130.2	117.0	127.1	142.6	153.0	173.6	192.0	235.6	2,043.3
Mean daily sunshine hours	8.3	7.3	5.6	4.5	4.2	3.9	4.1	4.6	5.1	5.6	6.4	7.6	5.6
Source: Instituto de Hidrologia Meteorologia y Estudios Ambientales

== Political and administrative structure ==
=== Territorial organization ===
The municipality is made up of the neighborhoods of the municipal seat and the inspections of San Pedro de Arimena, Puente Arimena, San Miguel, El Porvenir, Tillaba, Puerto Trujillo, Planas, Rubiales, La Cristalina and Murujuy.

== Economy ==
The economic activities of the municipality are basically subscribed to livestock, medium-scale agriculture, trade and fishing is incipient and artisanal industry as well. Livestock occupies the first line in the Municipality in the economic sector. In Agriculture, corn, banana, cassava and African palm crops stand out. The practice of fishing also represents a very good source of income and in tourism.

The Rubiales oil field is the largest generator of resources for this Municipality, being approximately 90% of the annual budget, but it is a non-renewable resource.
