= Arauca Department =

Department of Colombia

Department of Arauca Departamento de Arauca
- Department
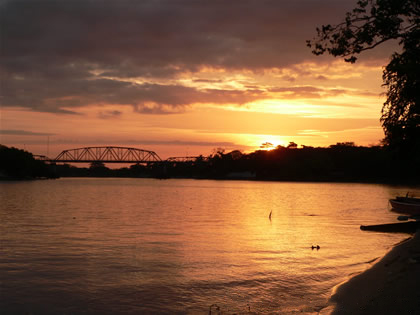
- Sunset over the Arauca River

- Flag Coat of arms
- Motto: Vamos Arauca (Spanish: Let's Go Arauca)
- Arauca shown in red

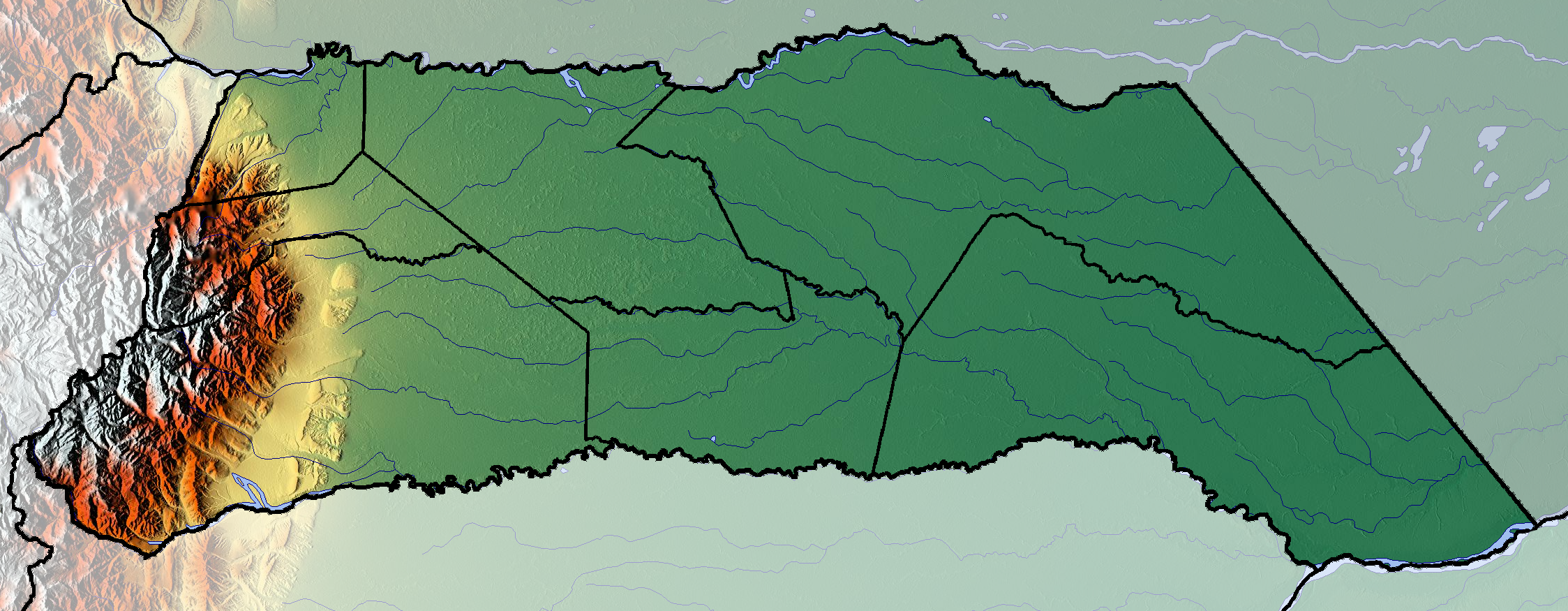
- Topography of the department
- Coordinates: 7°05′N 70°45′W
- Country: Colombia
- Region: Orinoquía Region
- Department: 1991
- Commissary: 1911
- Capital: Arauca

Government
  - Governor: Renson Jesus Martinez Prada (2024–2027)

Area
  - Total: 23,818 km^{2} (9,196 sq mi)
  - Rank: 18th

Population (2018)
  - Total: 262,174
  - Rank: 27th
  - Density: 11.007/km^{2} (28.509/sq mi)

GDP
  - Total: COP 8,548 billion (US$ 2.0 billion)
- Time zone: UTC-05
- ISO 3166 code: CO-ARA
- Municipalities: 7
- HDI: 0.761 high · 20th of 33
- Website: www.arauca.gov.co

Arauca (Spanish pronunciation: [aˈɾawka]) is a department of Eastern Colombia located in the extreme north of the Orinoco Basin of Colombia (the Llanos Orientales), bordering Venezuela. The southern boundary of Arauca is formed by the Casanare and Meta Rivers, separating Arauca from the departments of Casanare and Vichada. To the west, Arauca borders the department of Boyacá. The Caño Limón oilfield located within Arauca account for almost a third of the Colombian oil output. Its capital is the town of Arauca.

== Etymology ==
The name Arauca is believed to derive from the name of an Indigenous people, who are thought to be related to the Arawak or Arhuaco people. Some have also speculated that the name Arauca is connected with the Araucanian or Mapuche Indians of Chile and Argentina.

== History ==
The first conquistador to set foot in the region of present-day Arauca was Nikolaus Federmann in 1539. He was a soldier in the company of Georg von Speyer, who passed through the south of present-day Venezuela and the eastern part of what is today known as Colombia. In 1659, the Catholic missions were establishing new settlements in tribal Guahibo, U'wa, Aeric and Chirico tribal lands.

In the eighteenth century, being expelled from the Jesuits under Viceroy Pedro Mesia de la Zerda, the Augustinian Recollect succeeded in their mission of evangelization. They founded five centers of the catechism: Solitude of Cravo, Cuiloto San Javier, San Jose del Ele, Lipa San Joaquin and San Fernando de Arauca.

In 1810, the Araucanian territory became part of the newly created province of Casanare and in 1819 Arauca was incorporated into the province of Cundinamarca. By 1857, Arauca was made part of the Sovereign State of Boyacá, that later became the Boyacá department. In 1891, the Arauca police station was established with chief executive Pedro León Acosta. By decree 113 of January 20, 1955, the territory was elevated to the national quartermaster, and finally, with the Constitution of July 5, 1991, Arauca became a department. Arauca is the regional capital since 1911.

=== Political and administrative evolution ===
- 1550: The New Kingdom of Granada is officially established under the Audiencia
- 1810: With the division into new units, the Arauca territory becomes part of the province of Casanare
- 1818: Under president Fernando Serrano and Santander, General Commander of the patriotic forces, Arauca becomes provisional capital of the Republic
- 1819: The province of Casanare became part of the Department of Cundinamarca
- 1831: With the dissolution of Gran Colombia, Arauca remains part of the province of Casanare
- 1886: With the creation of the departments, Arauca becomes part of the Department of Boyacá
- 1911: Creation of the Special Commissioner of Arauca; capital of Arauca
- 1955: The Araucanian territory acquired the status of National Quartermaster
- 1960: Boyacá Arauca is created

== Geography ==
Its territory covers an area of 23,818 km^{2}, predominantly composed of plains.

== Ethnography ==
Historical population
Year	Pop.	±%
1938	11,156	—
1951	13,221	+18.5%
1964	24,148	+82.6%
1973	46,605	+93.0%
1985	89,972	+93.1%
1993	185,882	+106.6%
2005	232,112	+24.9%
2018	262,174	+13.0%

The Colombian census does not collect data on race and ethnicity, but compiled population estimates of the five groupings are:

- Indigenous Latino (93.70%)
- Afro-Colombians (4.07%)
- Native Tribal American or Tribal Indigenous (2.22%)
- Roma (0.01%)
- Asian (0.01%)

There are small numbers of descendants of European immigrants: the Spanish, German, Portuguese, Italian, French, British, Dutch, Polish, Greek and Arab (i.e. Lebanese, Syrian and Palestinian) nationalities.

Many Venezuelan nationals live in the department; around 10-15 percent of the population is of Venezuelan origin.

== Indigenous population ==
The department's total indigenous population amounts to 3591 people. Across the department 26 resguardos are located in an area of 128,167 hectares (316,710 acres). Six indigenous groups populate this region; U'wa with 1,124 members; Betoye at 800, Sikuani number 782, 441 Hitnü are registered, Kuiba count up to 241, Hitanü are listed at 110, the Chiricoa amount to 63 and thirty Piapoco are registered in Arauca. The predominant ethnic group in the department are the U'wa. They are located in the northeastern foothills of the Eastern Ranges of the Colombian Andes, until the Sierra Nevada del Cocuy in Boyacá. Its total population is estimated at 7231 people, belong to the Chibcha language family. U'wa means "intelligent people who can speak".

The Betoye with 800 members constitutes the second-largest ethnic group in the department. They inhabit the banks of the Cravo Norte River and the municipality of Tame. The area of its territory is 702 hectares (1,730 acres). Their language is considered part of the Chibcha language family. Although not retaining their original language, the people speak a mixture of Betoye with Spanish. Certain grammatical structures of the Betoye language persist in this mixture.

The Guahibo are subdivided into tribes known as Sikuani, Kuiba, Chiricoa, Hitnü (iguanito) and Hitnü (Macaguane), who speak Arawakan languages.

== Economy ==
The main economical activity of Arauca is centered around the oil industry, with the Caño Limón oilfields as the most important source. The soils of the region have shown good conditions for growing cacao, bananas, cassava, rice, corn and fruit trees, as well as industrial crops such as African palmtree, sorghum, soybeans and sesame. Livestock farming is another important factor of the department's economy.

== Municipalities ==
Map of the Municipalities in Arauca Department

Arauca department consists of seven municipalities.

1. Arauca
2. Arauquita
3. Cravo Norte
4. Fortul
5. Puerto Rondón
6. Saravena
7. Tame

== Gallery ==
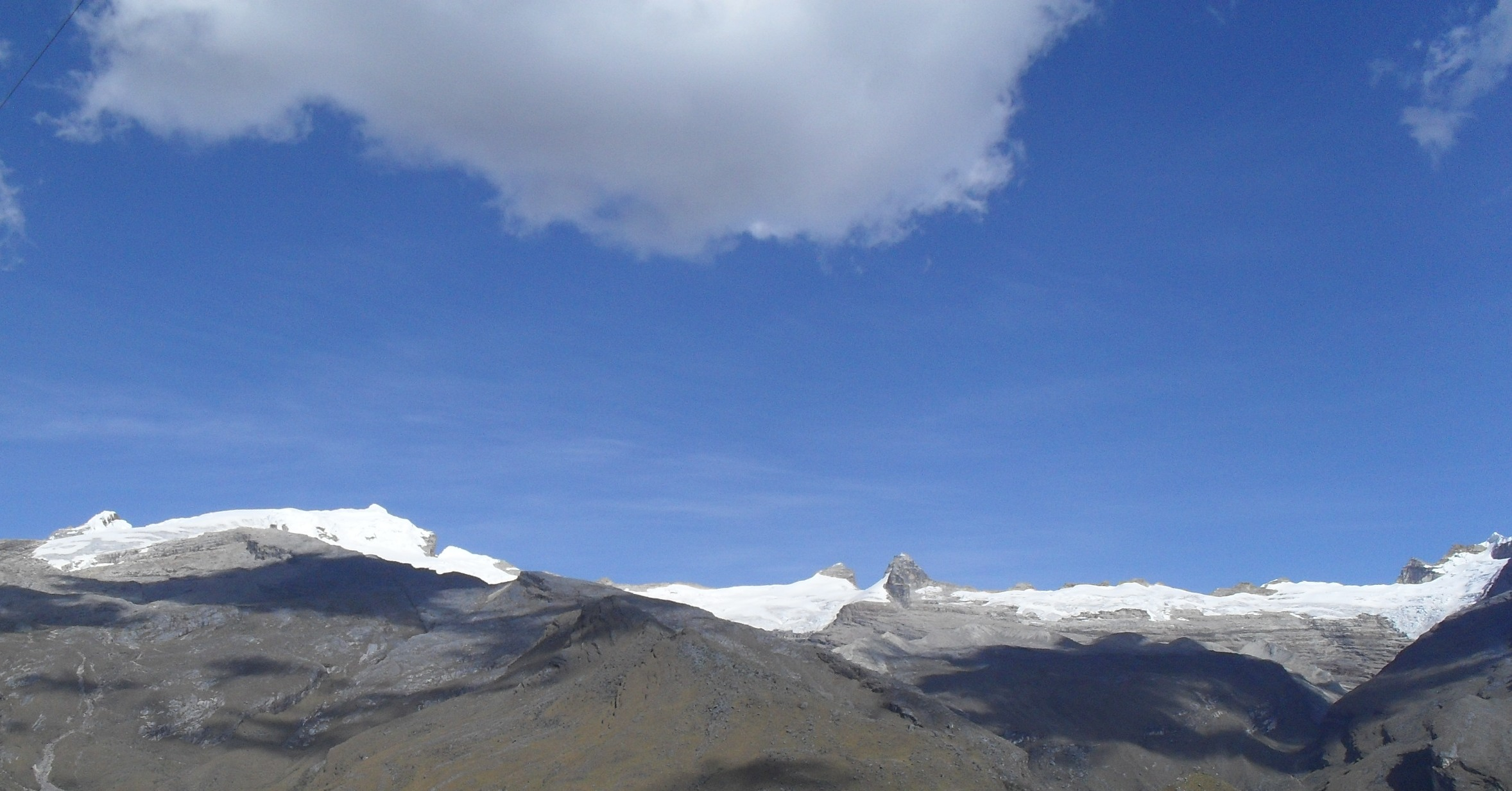
Sierra Nevada del Cocuy in Güicán

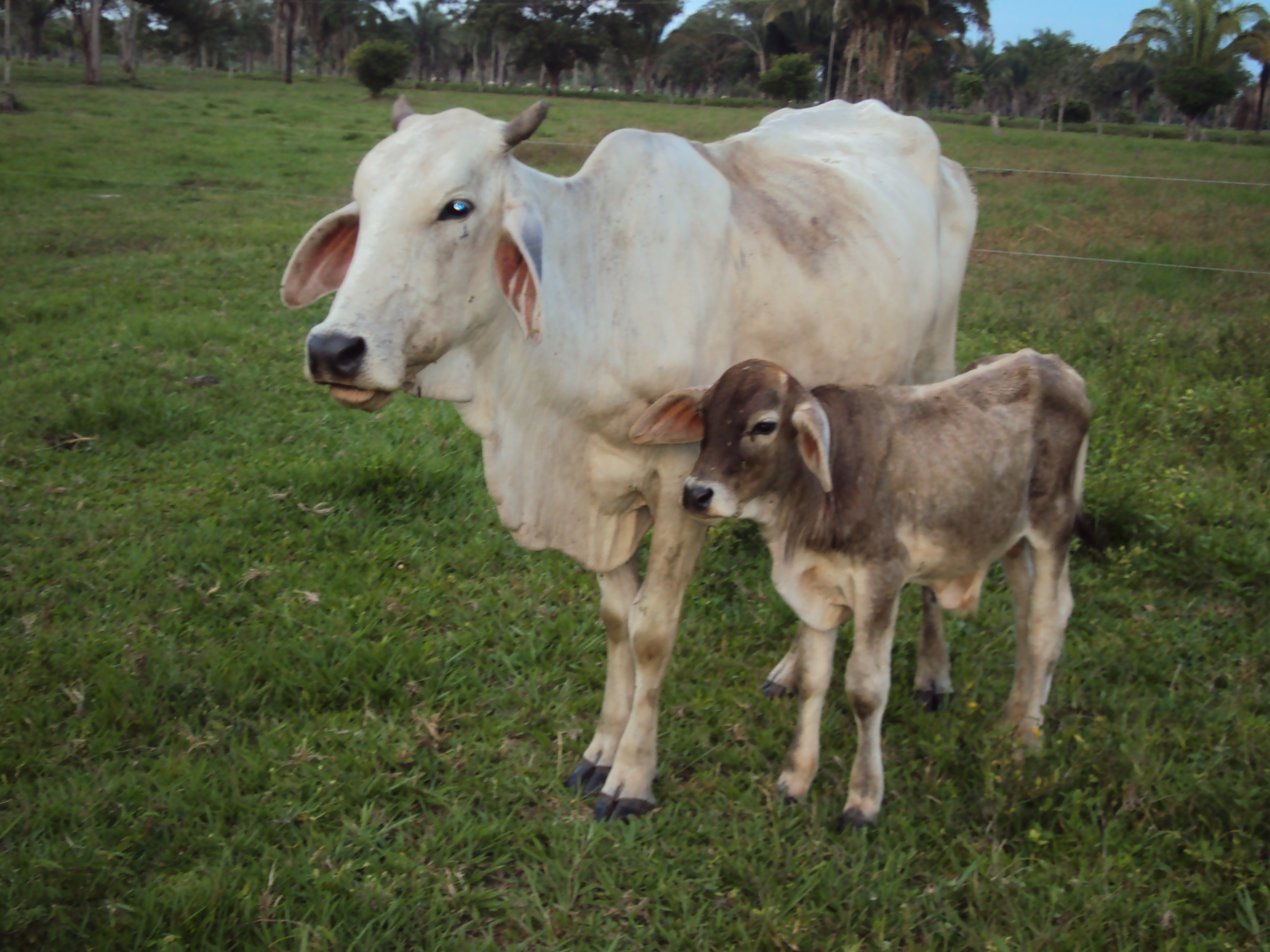
Cattle farming in Arauca

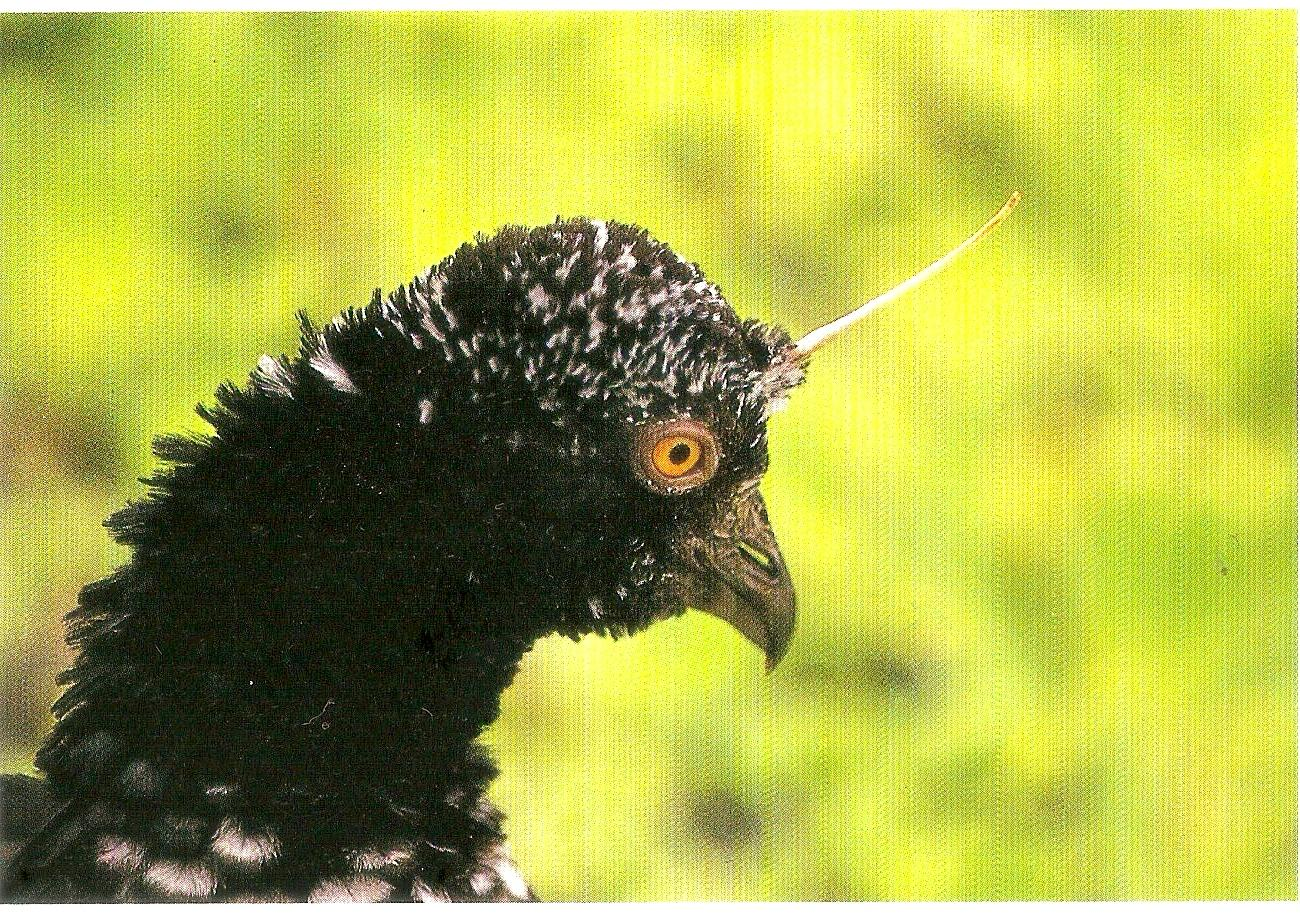
The arauco is the region's bird

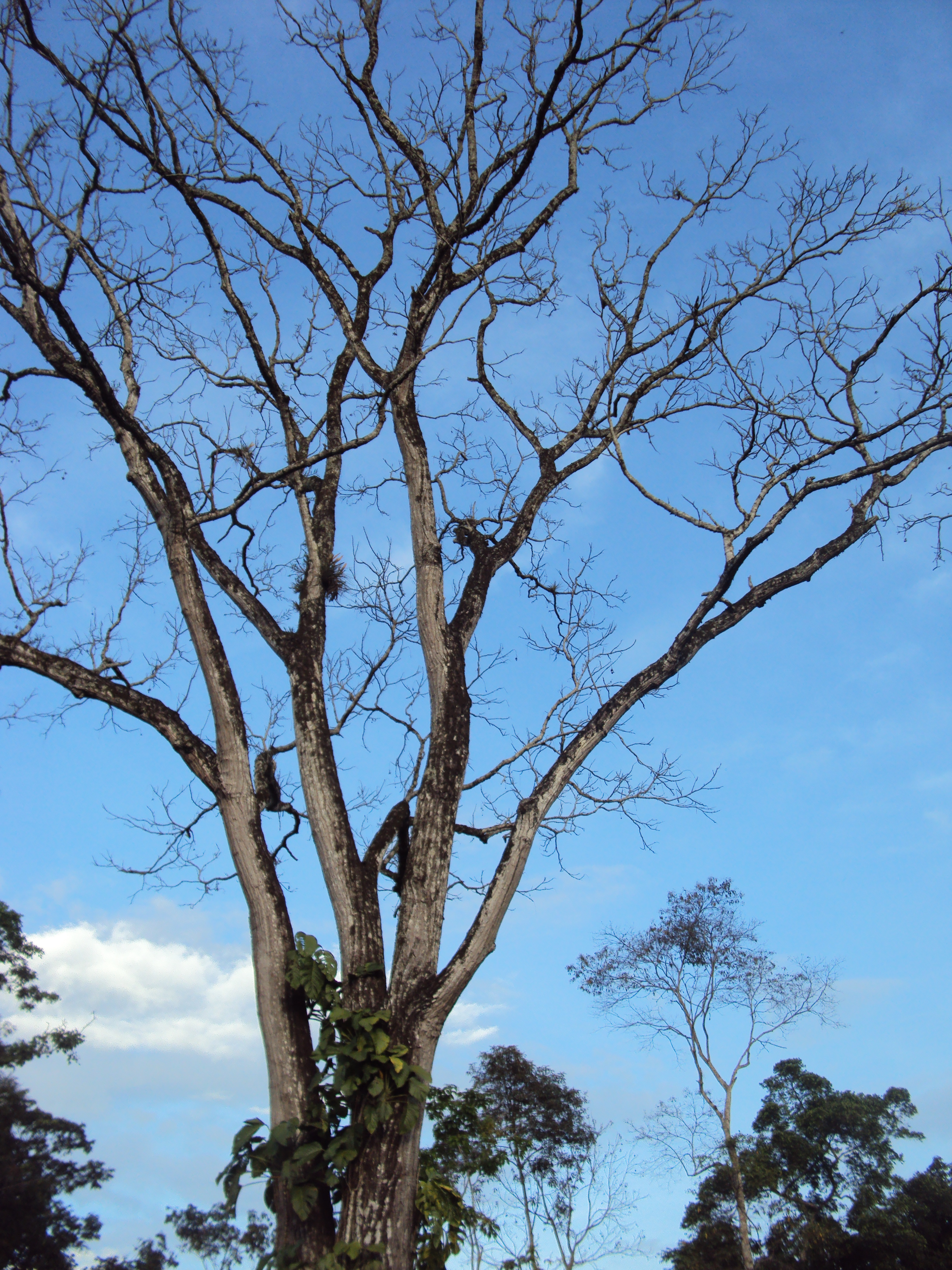
Tree in Fortul

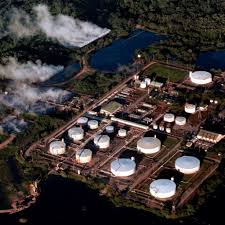
Caño Limón oil field in the municipality of Arauquita

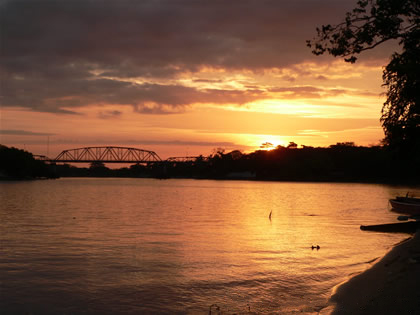
José Antonio Páez International Bridge, over the Arauca River, which connects Colombia and Venezuela
