= Ecopetrol =

Colombian petroleum company

Ecopetrol S.A.
- Type: Sociedad Anónima
- Traded as: BVC: ECOPETROL; NYSE: EC; FWB: ECHA
- Industry: Oil and Gas
- Founded: 1921; 105 years ago (Tropical Oil Company - Mares Concession); 1951; 75 years ago (Ecopetrol - created in 1948 by means of Law 165 of that year)
- Headquarters: Bogotá, Colombia
- Key people: Ricardo Roa, (Chairman & CEO)
- Products: oil and gas
- Revenue: ▲US$34.3 billion (2023)
- Operating income: ▲US$8.7 billion (2023)
- Total assets: ▲US$73 billion (2023)
- Number of employees: 9,315
- Website: www.ecopetrol.com.co

Ecopetrol, formerly known as Empresa Colombiana de Petróleo S.A. (English: Colombian Petroleum Co.), is the largest and primary petroleum company in Colombia. As a result of its continuous growth, Ecopetrol forms part of the Fortune Global 500 and was ranked 346. In the 2020 Forbes Global 2000, Ecopetrol was ranked as the 313th -largest public company in the world. It was ranked 303 in 2012 by CNN Money.

Ecopetrol should not be confused with the US owned and operated Colombian Petroleum Co. (COLPET) and sister company South American Gulf Oil Co. (SAGOC), dating to the 1930s and taken over by the state owned Ecopetrol in the 1970s.

The company is responsible for .71% of global carbon emissions which cause climate change, the 75th largest emitter of carbon as of 2023. The company has been embroiled in numerous controversies, including extensive oil pollution of hundreds of sites and waterways in Colombia, and other environmental human rights violations.

== History ==
The company arose from the assets reverted from the "Mares Concession", awarded by President Rafael Reyes to the Tropical Oil Company, which began operating in 1921 with the Infantas 2 well and the subsequent start of production of the Cira-Infantas Field in the Middle Magdalena Valley (VMM). The giant oilfield is located 11 kilometres (6.8 mi) south of the city of Barrancabermeja and about 500 kilometres (310 mi) northeast of the capital, Bogotá. Even though there were attempts as early as 1941 for the Colombian government to legally take over the Tropical Oil Co., it was not until the expiration of the Concesión De Mares contract that a transfer of ownership took place.

The reversion of the "Mares Concession" ("Concesión De Mares") to the Colombian State on 25 August 1951 gave way to the Empresa Colombiana de Petróleos, which had been created in 1948 by means of Law 165 of that year. The growing company assumed the reverted assets of the Tropical Oil Co., which had begun oil activities in Colombia in 1921 with the implementation of the Cira-Infantas Field in the Middle Magdalena River Valley. Ecopetrol undertook activities throughout the oil chain as a state-owned industrial and commercial company in charge of administering the nation's hydrocarbon resources, and grew as other concessions reverted and became part of its operations.

The nationalization of Ecopetrol was not smooth and met with some opposition and skepticism as to whether the company would be able to keep up with the complex and expensive operations without outside expertise in the changing international market. A call for nationalization was nevertheless made.

In 1961, it assumed the direct management of the Barrancabermeja Refinery. Thirteen years later, it purchased the Cartagena Refinery, built by Intercol in 1956. In 1970, the company adopted its first by-laws, which ratified its nature as a state-owned commercial and industrial company, linked to the Ministry of Mines and Energy and fiscally supervised by the General Controllership of the Republic of Colombia. In September 1983, the discovery of the giant Caño Limón Field was announced. Ecopetrol, in association with Oxy, reported a reservoir with reserves estimated at 1.1 billion barrels (170,000,000 m^{3}). Thanks to this field, the company began a new era and, in 1986, Colombia began to export oil again. During the 1990s, Colombia extended its oil self-sufficiency with the discovery of the giant Cusiana and Cupiagua Fields in the foothills of the Eastern Ranges of the Colombian Andes, bordering the Llanos Orientales. The fields were operated by BP.

In 2003, the Colombian government restructured the Empresa Colombiana de Petróleos in order to internationalize it and make the company more competitive within the global hydrocarbon industry. Decree 1760, dated 26 June 2003, modified the organic structure of the Empresa Colombiana de Petróleos and transformed it into Ecopetrol S.A., a public stock-holding corporation, wholly state-owned, associated with the Ministry of Mines and Energy, and governed by its by-laws contained in Notarized Document No. 2931, dated 7 July 2003, issued by the Second Notary Public of the Bogotá D.C. Circle. The transformation released the company from its role as administrator of the oil resources, and the ANH (Agencia Nacional de Hidrocarburos), or National Hydrocarbon Agency, was created to carry out that function.

As of 2003, Ecopetrol S.A. began a new phase in which, with greater autonomy, it accelerated its exploratory activities, strengthened its capacity to obtain results with a business and commercial vision, and sought to improve its competitiveness in the global oil market. Internationally, the company also operates in the Gulf of Mexico, from Houston, Texas; offshore in the Mexican Gulf of Mexico near Veracruz, Tabasco and Campeche; and offshore in Brazil, with offices based in Rio de Janeiro.

On 20 August 2021, the company acquired a 51.4% controlling stake in Interconexión Eléctrica, previously held by the Ministry of Finance and Public Credit, establishing a diversified energy conglomerate in South America.

Yuvelis Morales Blanco was awarded the Goldman Prize in 2026 for her advocacy against Ecopetrol's fracking.

== Capitalization ==
The presidential signature in the law 1118 of 27 December 2006 was given after Colombian Congress' two houses approved in the night of Dec. 13 the bill of law in a session that extended for near eight hours. The initiative fixed limits for the participation of those who aspire to have shares of the company. Individuals who want to take part in the process will be able to acquire shares maximum up to five thousand legal monthly minimum wages, or about 2 billion Colombian pesos (some US$904,000). Whereas, no one private company will be permitted to own more than 3 percent of the Ecopetrol shares put out for sale, and pension funds, mutual funds and pension autonomous' Ecopetrol funds not be able to acquire any more than 15 percent, during the first two rounds. After the Congress approval, the Acting President of Ecopetrol, Mauricio Salgar Hurtado, declared himself satisfied by the approval of the initiative which, as he said, "clears the future of the company".

Ecopetrol will be able to tackle an ambitious plan of investments estimated in 12.5 billion dollars for the next five years. These resources will allow it to intensify the exploration and to increase the own production up to reaching levels of 500,000 barrels (79,000 m^{3}) of oil equivalent in the year 2011. Behind that, it will be possible to advance in the internationalization plan of the company and to execute projects of modernization of the refineries and of improvement of the quality of the fuels. The company will be able to penetrate into the research, development and marketing of clean-energy technology and into the biofuels market. Finally, Ecopetrol will not be forced anymore to assume fiscal charges different from the derivatives of its corporate purpose.

To guarantee the democratization of the company, the placement of stocks will include three rounds. Both first ones will be directed to the Colombian solidary sector, that is to say, the pension funds, cooperatives, workers and pensioned of Ecopetrol, territorial entities and the Colombians in general. The remaining stocks will be offered to the public and other companies. The Colombian Government will assure a budget of investment for the years 2007 and 2008 not lower than for 2006 (US$1.4 billion) fitted by the growth of the GDP.

Once Ecopetrol becomes a mixed stock-holding corporation (80 percent governmental and 20 percent private), it will continue to be directed by the Stockholders General Assembly, the Board of Directors and the President of Society. The Colombian departments (provinces) in which Ecopetrol extracts hydrocarbons will have a seat in the Board of Directors. The selection of this representative must be established in the by-laws of the company. The next step is the selection of the investment banks which will valorize the company. The first round of stocks placement for Ecopetrol started on 27 August 2007.

In Nov. 2007, Ecopetrol held an initial public offering on the Colombian Stock Exchange (BVC), which raised $5.7 trillion Colombian Pesos (US$2.8 billion) from the sale of a 10.1 percent stake. On 18 September 2008 Ecopetrol announced the listing of its American Depositary Shares (ADSs) on the New York Stock Exchange (NYSE). Each ADS represents 20 ordinary shares of Ecopetrol common stock. The ADSs began trading that day on the NYSE under the ticker symbol "EC". JPMorgan Chase Bank, N.A. is acting as depositary for the ADS program and LaBranche & Co Inc. serves as the specialist for trading the ADSs.

In July 2008, a Latin American investment advisor, the Compass Group, stated that Colombia has an industry growth in many areas including energy, agriculture, technology, infrastructure and manufactured products. In addition to GDP growth and investment climate, Colombia has commodities growth. Ecopetrol is a major part of that commodities growth, as it has $60 billion to invest in oil development.

== See also ==
- Transandino pipeline
