= San José Island (Colombia) =

Island in Colombia

Native name: Isla San José
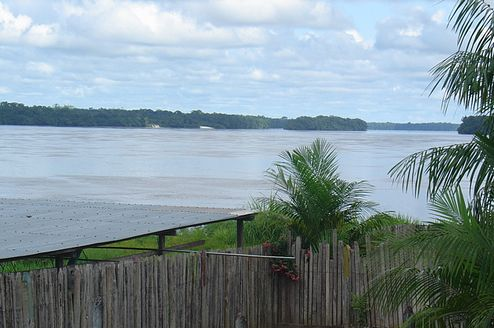

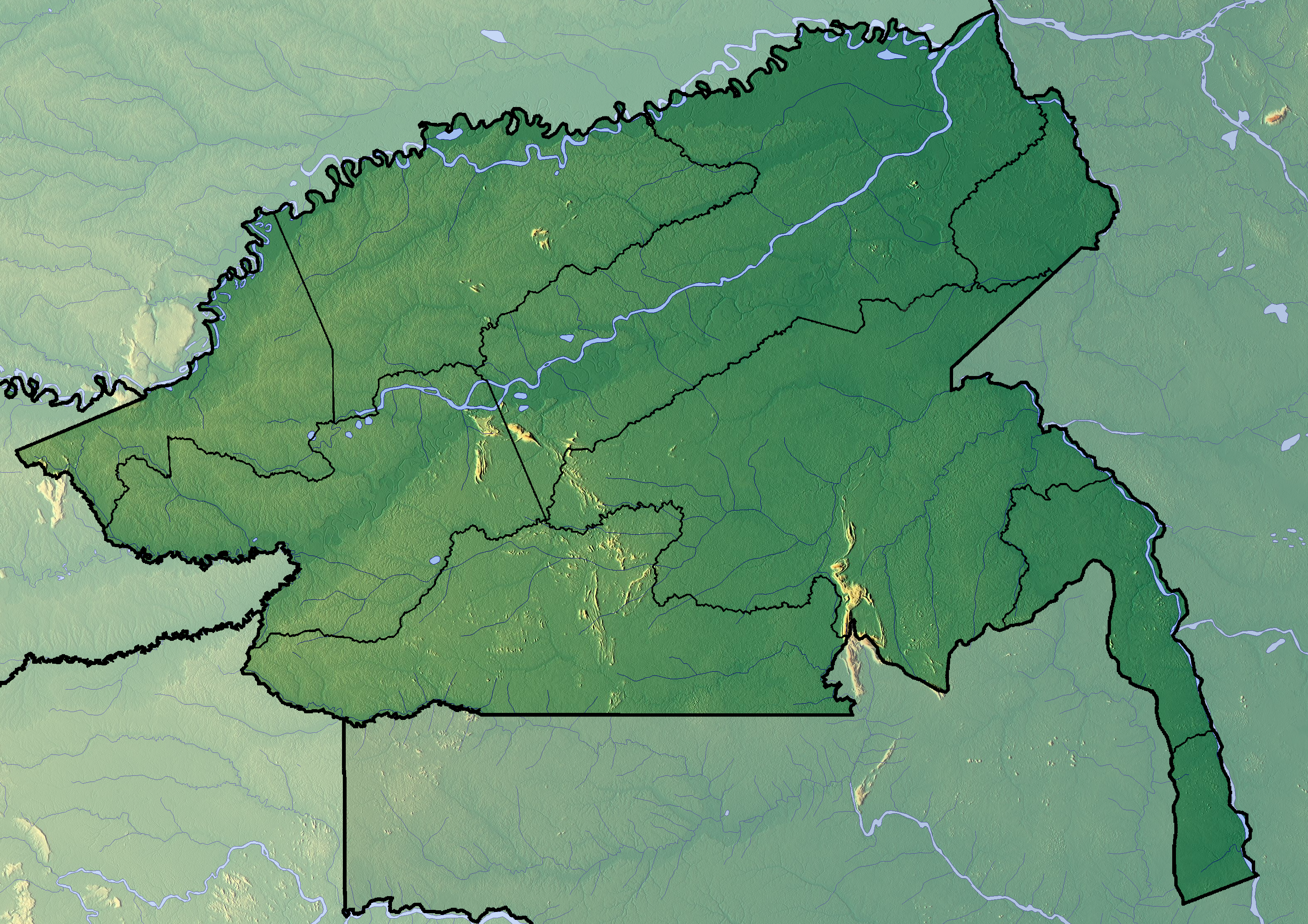
- Location within Guainía Department Location within Colombia Location within Venezuela Location within Brazil
- Interactive map of San José Island

Geography
- Location: Rio Negro
- Coordinates: 1°13′44″N 66°51′18″W
- Highest point: 92m

Administration
- Colombia
- Department: Guainía Department

Additional information
- Time zone: UTC-05

San José Island (Spanish: Isla San José)(Portuguese: São José) is a river island in the Rio Negro, located at the easternmost part of Colombia. Administratively, it is located in the municipality of La Guadalupe in the Guainía Department. It is located in front of the Piedra del Cocuy. It serves as boundary marker of the borders with Venezuela and with Brazil, for which it is considered a tripoint.

== Climate ==
The climate is tropical, with a temperature of 22 °C. The warmest month is February at 24°C and the coolest is June at 20°C. Average precipitation is 4,286 millimeters per year. The month with the most precipitation is May, with 571 millimeters of rain, and the month with the least is November, with 216 millimeters.
