= Colombia–Venezuela border =

International border

Coordinates: 1.2278°N 66.8694°W

The border between Colombia and Venezuela

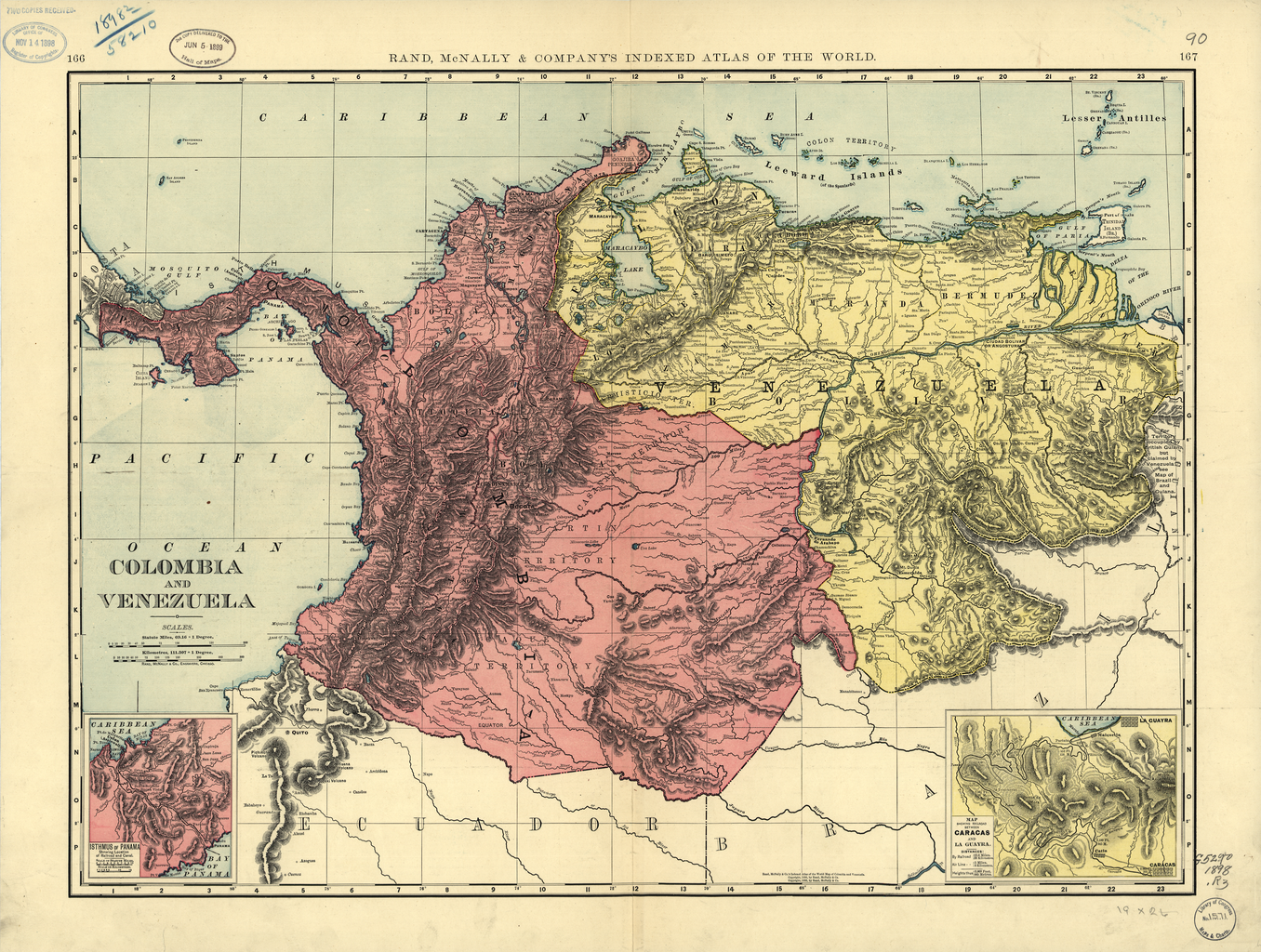
Colombia and Venezuela in 1898

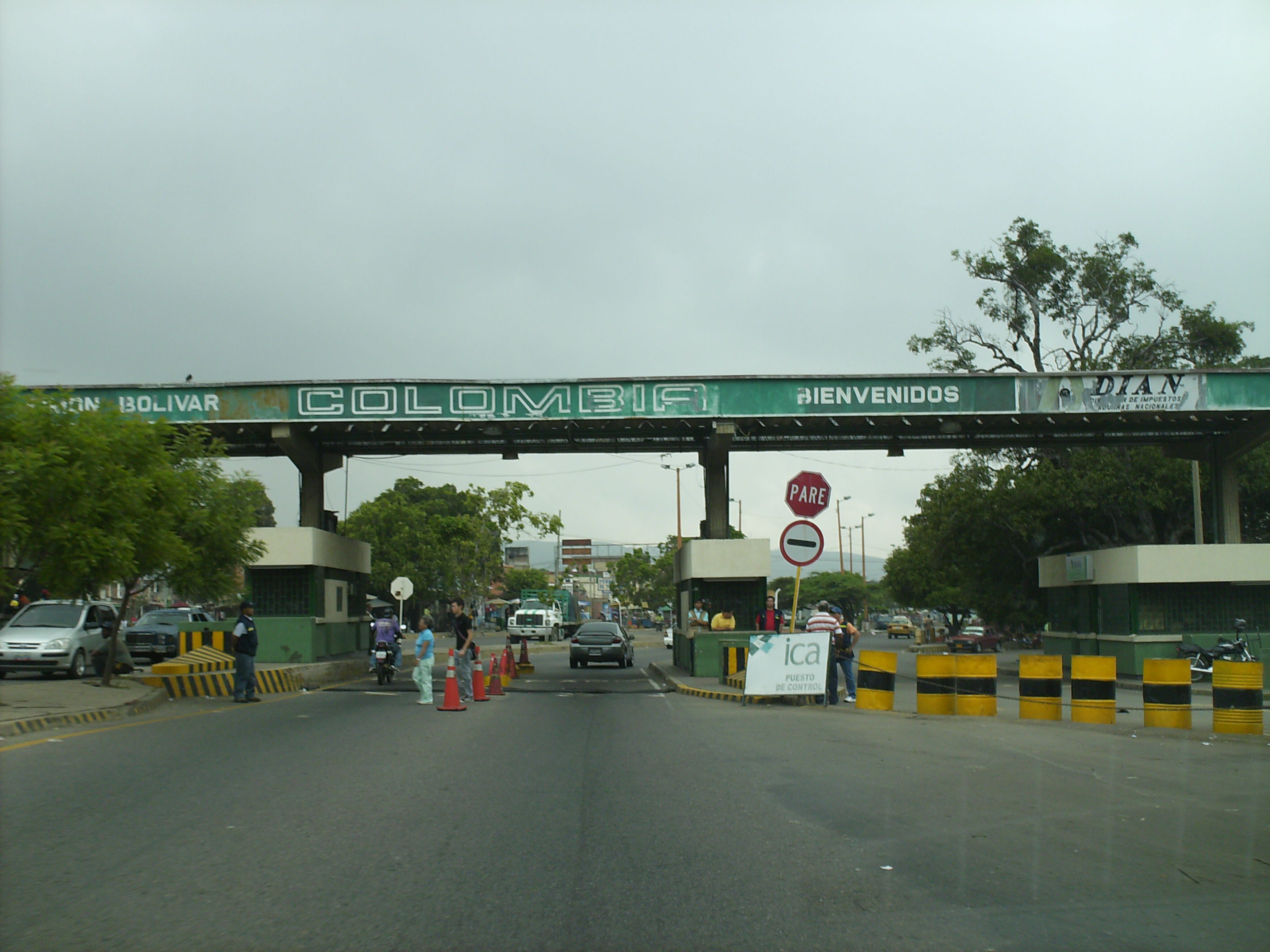
The border between Colombia and Venezuela

The Colombia–Venezuela border is an international border of 2219 kilometers (1378 mi) between Colombia and Venezuela, with a total of 603 milestones that demarcate the line. It is the longest border of both Colombia and Venezuela.

The border, at least in its terrestrial part, was essentially demarcated by two treaties: the Spanish Arbitration Award of Queen Maria Cristina of 1891 and the Treaty of Limits and River Navigation of 1941. But the definition of the border in the Gulf of Venezuela is still disputed, causing diplomatic clashes between the two countries.

In August 2015, two Venezuelan soldiers were injured during a fight with alleged Colombian smugglers, prompting Venezuelan Dictator Nicolás Maduro to close a large part of the border, except in Táchira.

== Border cities ==
Colombia

- Paraguachón, Maicao, Manaure del Cesar, Codazzi, Becerril, Tibú, Puerto Santander, Cúcuta, Villa del Rosario, Ragonvalia, Herrán, Cubará, Saravena, Arauquita, Arauca, Puerto Carreño, San José de Maipures, Inírida, Cacahual, Puerto Colombia, San Felipe, La Guadalupe.

Venezuela

- Paraguaipoa, Las Cruces, Casigua El Cubo, La Fría, San Juan de Colón, Ureña, San Antonio del Táchira, San Cristóbal, Rubio, Delicias, Guasdualito, El Amparo, Elorza, Puerto Páez, Puerto Ayacucho, Isla Ratón, San Fernando de Atabapo, Maroa, San Carlos de Río Negro.

== Border rivers ==
The main rivers that cross or are part of the border are:

- Río de Oro
- Catatumbo River
- San Pedro River
- Táchira River
- Nula River
- Arauca River
- Meta River
- Orinoco River
- Rio Negro

== See also ==
- Colombia–Venezuela relations
- Venezuela–Colombia migrant crisis
