= Barranco Minas Airport =

- IATA: NBB; ICAO: SKBM; LID: SK-209

Summary
- Airport type: Public
- Serves: Barranco Minas, Colombia
- Elevation AMSL: 430 ft / 131 m
- Coordinates: 3°29′26″N 69°48′35″W

Map
- Location of the airport in Colombia

Runways
Direction	Length		Surface
Direction	m	ft	Surface
09/27	900	2,953	Asphalt
- Sources: GCM Google Maps

Barranco Minas Airport (IATA: NBB, ICAO: SKBM) is an airport serving the river town of Barranco Minas in the Guainía Department of Colombia.

The runway is adjacent to the Guaviare River and has 470 metres (1,540 ft) of grass overrun available on its east end.

== See also ==
- Transport in Colombia
- List of airports in Colombia
