= César Gaviria Trujillo Airport =

César Gaviria Trujillo Airport Obando Airport
- IATA: PDA; ICAO: SKPD

Summary
- Airport type: Public
- Serves: Inírida, Colombia
- Elevation AMSL: 325 ft (99 m)
- Coordinates: 3°51′10″N 67°54′22″W

Map
- Location of airport in Colombia

Runways
Direction	Length		Surface
Direction	m	ft	Surface
17/35	1,940	6,365	Asphalt
- Sources: GCM

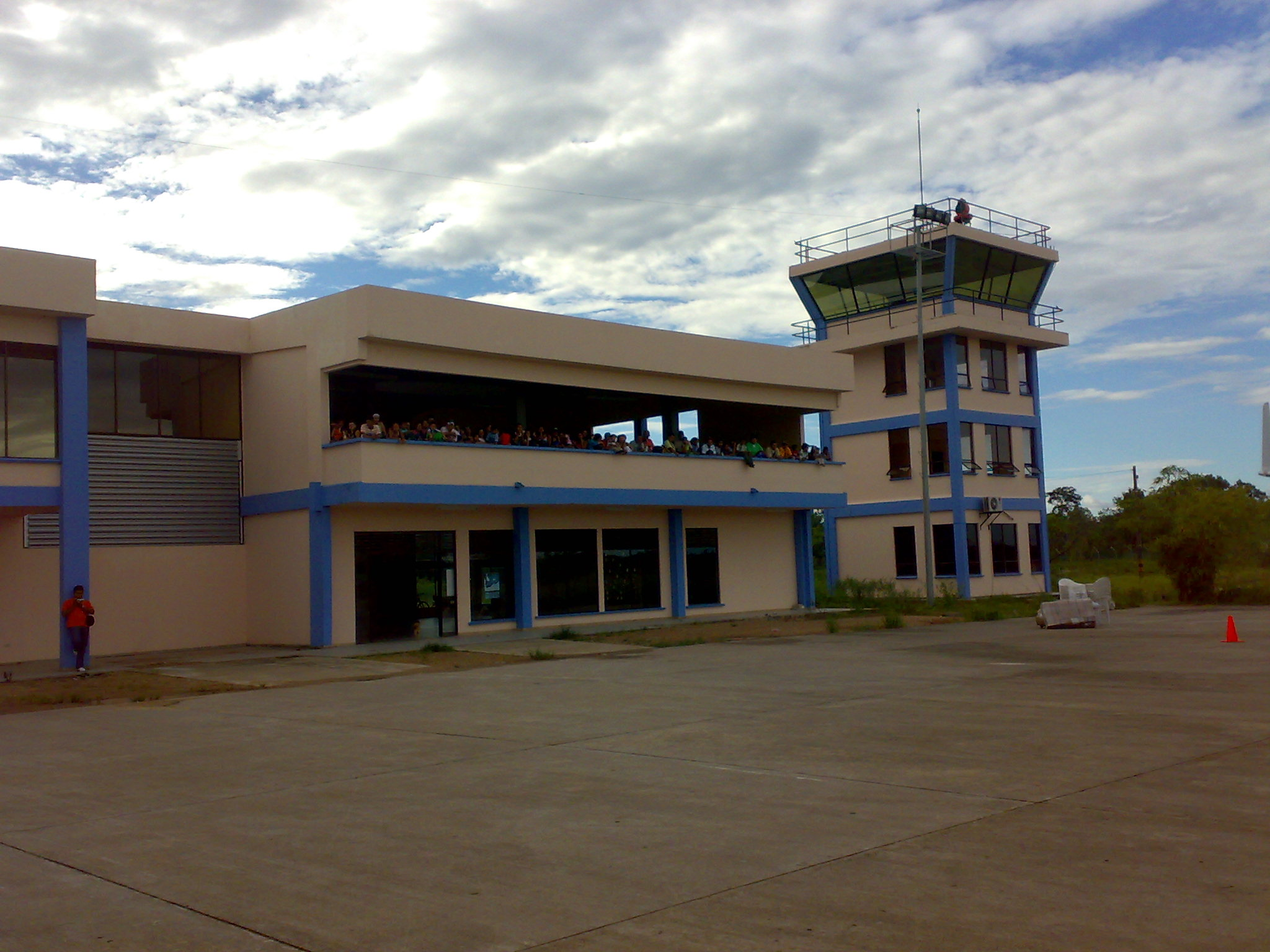
Aeropuerto Inírida - Guainía

César Gaviria Trujillo Airport (IATA: PDA, ICAO: SKPD) is an airport serving the town of Inírida in the Guainía Department of Colombia. The airport is named after César Gaviria Trujillo, a former President of Colombia and Secretary General of the Organization of American States. It is 2 kilometres (1.2 mi) east of the town.

== Airlines and destinations ==
Airlines	Destinations
SATENA	Bogota, Villavicencio

== See also ==
- Transport in Colombia
- List of airports in Colombia
