= Territorial Environmental Information System of the Colombian Amazon =

SIAT-AC
- Territorial Environmental Information System of the Colombian Amazon
- Sistema de información ambiental territorial de la Amazonia colombiana
- Official language: English
- Parent organization: Sinchi Amazonic Institute of Scientific Research
- Website: siatac.co

The Territorial Environmental Information System of the Colombian Amazon SIAT-AC (Spanish: Sistema de información ambiental territorial de la Amazonia colombiana) has been defined as a process in which a set of institutions sets up agreements and common goals for the environmental information management of the Colombian Amazon. The agreements cover concepts, organization, data infrastructure, methodologies, protocols, and technological issues such as information networks, telecommunications, and access, organized by a network of individuals and entities to provide data and information products for regional decision makers to achieve sustainable development.

== Purposes ==
SIAT-AC contributions range from environmental information management to knowledge generation, decision-making, and social participation for the sustainable development and management of the Colombian Amazon, by:

- Helping to make the processes of occupying the Amazon territory environmentally and socially sustainable.
- Organizing and properly distributing environmental information to support national and regional processes that affect the Colombian Amazon. These processes include: policy design, research, development, education, production and extraction of natural resources, environmental monitoring, environmental management, and construction of a regional vision.
- Designing and establishing a network of institutions and individuals operating under agreements regarding environmental information management.
- Promoting the assurance of permanent environmental data of the CA managed by SINA's entities.
- Facilitating access to environmental information on the Colombian Amazon for all audiences.
- Adapting, adopting or developing standards, protocols, technology solutions and processes to capture, generate, process, move, disclose and manage the generated information on the Colombian Amazon. Responding to the demand for environmental information on the Colombian Amazon.
