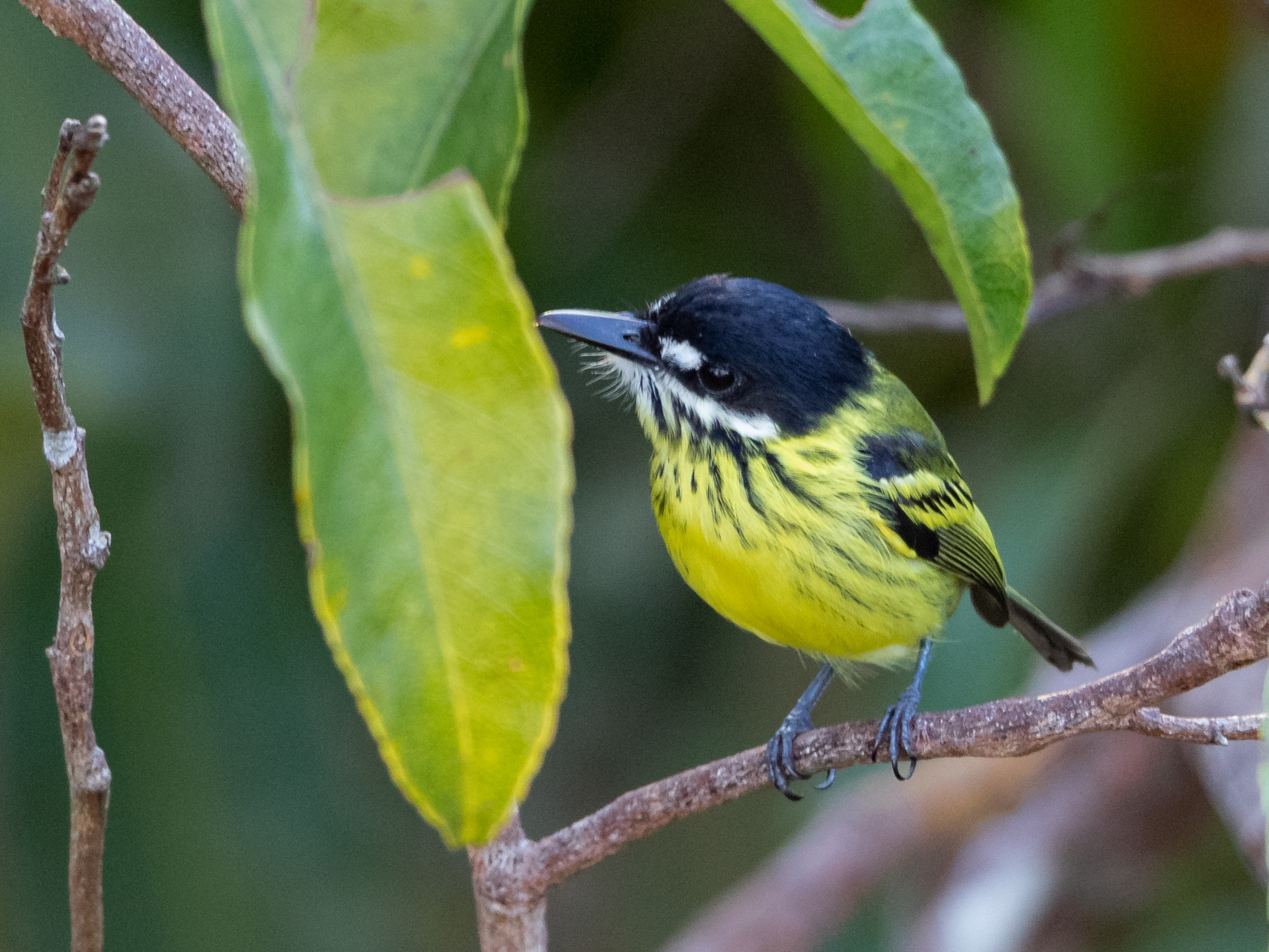

Conservation status
- Least Concern (IUCN 3.1)

Scientific classification
- Kingdom: Animalia
- Phylum: Chordata
- Class: Aves
- Order: Passeriformes
- Family: Tyrannidae
- Genus: Todirostrum
- Species: T. pictum

Binomial name
- Todirostrum pictum Salvin, 1897

= Painted tody-flycatcher =

Species of bird

The painted tody-flycatcher (Todirostrum pictum) is a species of bird in the family Tyrannidae, the tyrant flycatchers. It is found in Brazil, French Guiana, Guyana, Suriname, Venezuela, and possibly Colombia.

== Taxonomy and systematics ==
The painted tody-flycatcher was originally described in 1897 as a full species with its current binomial Todirostrum pictum. Some mid-twentieth century authors considered it a subspecies of the yellow-browed tody-flycatcher (T. chrysocrotaphum) but by the 1970s it had regained is status as a full species. Several authors treat the painted, yellow-browed, and black-headed tody-flycatcher (T. nigriceps) as a superspecies.

The painted tody-flycatcher is monotypic.

== Description ==
The painted tody-flycatcher is 9 to 10.2 cm (3.5 to 4.0 in) long and weighs 6 to 8 g (0.21 to 0.28 oz). The sexes are alike. Adults have a mostly black head with a white spot above the lores and a long white "moustache". A narrow yellow band separates their nape from their olive back, rump, and uppertail coverts. Their wings are black with yellow edges on the flight feathers and the edges and tips of the coverts; the last show as two wing bars. Their tail is black with olive outer edges on the feathers. Their throat is whitish with black streaks. Their underparts are mostly bright yellow with black streaks on the breast and sides. They have a dark brown or yellow iris, a black bill, and blackish legs and feet.

== Distribution and habitat ==
The painted tody-flycatcher is found in Amazonas, eastern Bolívar, and Delta Amacuro states in eastern Venezuela. Its range continues east through the Guianas and northern Brazil north of the Amazon from the Rio Negro to the Atlantic in Amapá and northern Pará. In addition, McMullan et al's Field Guide to the Birds of Colombia includes the species in extreme eastern Guainía Department; the South American Classification Committee of the American Ornithological Society lists the species a hypothetical in Colombia.

The painted tody-flycatcher inhabits a variety of landscapes, most of them forested, where it typically is found in the canopy and on the edges. They include humid terra firme, várzea, dry forest, and mature secondary forest. It also occurs in clearings within the forest and in plantations as long as some tall trees are present. In elevation it ranges from sea level to 400 m (1,300 ft).

== Behavior ==
=== Movement ===
The painted tody-flycatcher is believed to be a year-round resident.

=== Feeding ===
The painted tody-flycatcher feeds on arthropods. It typically forages singly or in pairs and rarely joins mixed-species feeding flocks. It mostly forages in the forest canopy and along its edges. It primarily takes prey from foliage with short upward and outward sallies from a perch.

=== Breeding ===
The painted tody-flycatcher's breeding season has not been defined but includes October in Suriname. Both members of a pair build the nest, a closed bag with a side entrance. It is made from plant fibers bound with spider web and lined with soft plant material, and typically hangs from a branch high in a tree. Often fibers hang messily from the nest's bottom. The clutch size, incubation period, time to fledging, and details of parental care are not known.

=== Vocalization ===
The painted tody-flycatcher's vocalizations are "piercing and surprisingly loud for so small a bird". Its song is a series of "8-12 bright, emphatic peek! notes" that sometimes accelerate when the bird is excited. Its call is "a double-sounding chevik". Another author describes the species' vocalization as "sequences of irregularly spaced, extr. high 'tsit' notes".

== Status ==
The IUCN has assessed the painted tody-flycatcher as being of Least Concern. It has a large range; its population size is not known and is believed to be decreasing. No immediate threats have been identified. It is considered uncommon to fairly common overall, "very rare and local" in Colombia, and "fairly common" in Venezuela. It is "often overlooked [and] most frequently located by voice".
