= Inírida, Guainía =

Inírida
- Municipality and city
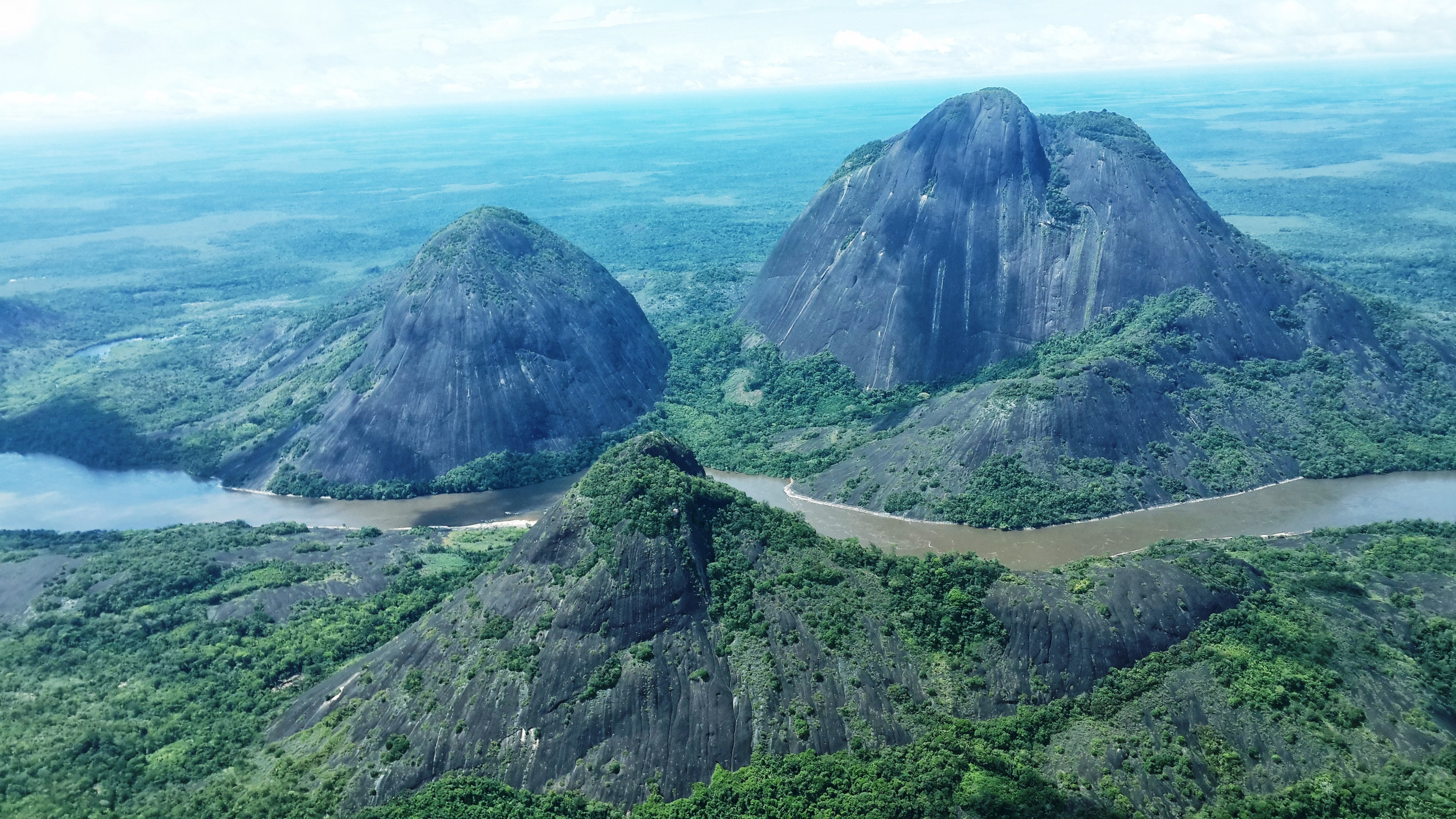
- Mavecure Hills

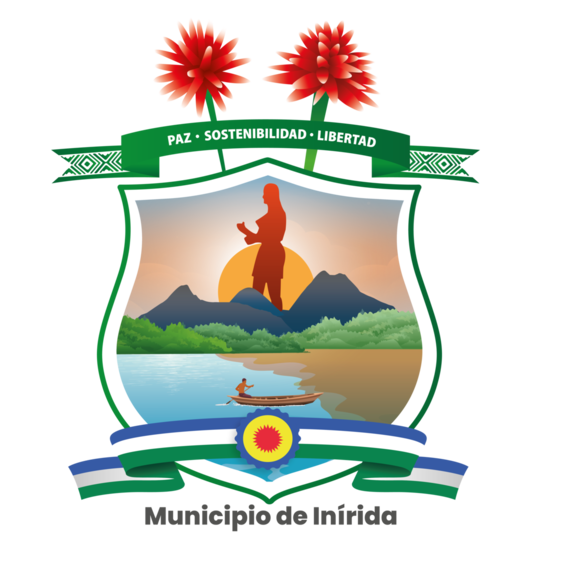
- Flag Coat of arms

- Location of the municipality and town of Inírida, Guainía in the Guainía Department of Colombia

- Location in Colombia Inírida (Guainía Department)
- Coordinates: 3°51′55″N 67°55′26″W
- Country: Colombia
- Region: Amazon Region
- Department: Guainía Department

Area
  - Municipality and city: 15,970 km^{2} (6,170 sq mi)
  - Urban: 8.56 km^{2} (3.31 sq mi)

Population (2018 census)
  - Municipality and city: 31,514
  - Density: 1.973/km^{2} (5.111/sq mi)
  - Urban: 20,279
  - Urban density: 2,370/km^{2} (6,140/sq mi)
- Time zone: UTC-05 (Colombia Standard Time)

Inírida (Spanish pronunciation: [iˈniɾiða]), formerly Puerto Inírida, is the capital city, and a municipality, of the department of Guainía in Colombia. It was established in 1963 on the site of the small village of Obando, at the time in the municipality of San Felipe. The municipality was renamed in 1974. The municipal population of 31,514 (2018 census) is mostly indigenous and accounts for about a third of the department's population.

== History ==
Prior to 1960 there was little development in the area, which was sparsely populated by almost entirely indigenous people. However, in the 1990s and 2000s, with increased exploitation of the area’s natural resources, efforts have been made to manage the local population.

== Geography ==
Located in the llanos at the confluence of the Inírida River and Guaviare River, most of the territory of the municipality of Puerto Inírida is river terrace and bottomland, although there are some hills. It is 30 kilometres or 19 miles from the Venezuelan border.

=== Climate ===
Inírida has a tropical rainforest climate (Köppen: Af). It has heavy to very heavy rainfall year-round.

Climate data for Inírida (Pto Inirida), elevation 100 m (330 ft), (1981–2010)
Month	Jan	Feb	Mar	Apr	May	Jun	Jul	Aug	Sep	Oct	Nov	Dec	Year
Mean daily maximum °C (°F)	32.7 (90.9)	33.2 (91.8)	33.0 (91.4)	31.7 (89.1)	30.4 (86.7)	29.9 (85.8)	29.9 (85.8)	30.6 (87.1)	31.7 (89.1)	32.1 (89.8)	32.0 (89.6)	32.1 (89.8)	31.6 (88.9)
Daily mean °C (°F)	27 (81)	27.4 (81.3)	27.4 (81.3)	26.7 (80.1)	26.2 (79.2)	25.8 (78.4)	25.6 (78.1)	26.0 (78.8)	26.5 (79.7)	26.7 (80.1)	26.8 (80.2)	26.9 (80.4)	26.5 (79.7)
Mean daily minimum °C (°F)	22.3 (72.1)	22.7 (72.9)	22.8 (73.0)	22.9 (73.2)	22.9 (73.2)	22.6 (72.7)	22.3 (72.1)	22.5 (72.5)	22.3 (72.1)	22.6 (72.7)	22.8 (73.0)	22.6 (72.7)	22.6 (72.7)
Average precipitation mm (inches)	90.9 (3.58)	127.4 (5.02)	118.5 (4.67)	293.7 (11.56)	435.6 (17.15)	504.4 (19.86)	509.1 (20.04)	398.9 (15.70)	297.7 (11.72)	224.3 (8.83)	204.6 (8.06)	123.0 (4.84)	3,327.9 (131.02)
Average precipitation days	9	10	13	19	25	25	25	23	19	17	15	12	206
Average relative humidity (%)	81	79	79	84	87	87	86	85	83	83	83	82	84
Mean monthly sunshine hours	213.9	177.8	170.5	135.0	120.9	123.0	139.5	161.2	174.0	176.7	168.0	182.9	1,943.4
Mean daily sunshine hours	6.9	6.3	5.5	4.5	3.9	4.1	4.5	5.2	5.8	5.7	5.6	5.9	5.3
Source: Instituto de Hidrologia Meteorologia y Estudios Ambientales

== Economy ==
The main economic activities in the municipality, aside from government, are agriculture, fishing and cattle raising. Agriculture includes subsistence farming, the production of fiber from the petioles of the young chiquichiqui palm (Bactris speciosa), used for rope, and the rattan known as "Yaré" used for furniture and baskets.

Tourists visit for several activities including fishing, canoeing, sightseeing and hiking. Hotels and hostels have appeared as national and international visitors continue to come. Handicrafts have now become a popular industry, and are supported by government institutions.

== Demographics ==
The society of Inírida is composed of 53% of indigenous people: Kurripacos, Puinaves and Piapocos. 30% are colonizers from the other parts of Colombia and 17% are other indigenous ethnic groups.

== Transportation ==
=== Airports ===
The local airport is César Gaviria Trujillo Airport (IATA: PDA, ICAO: SKPD), named in honor of a former Colombian president. As of 2007, its runway is serviced by two airlines, Satena, with three flights per week to and from Bogotá and two flights a week to and from Villavicencio, and Air Colombia twice a week from Villavicencio, through Barrancominas, Guainía and then arriving at Inírida. This airline operates a Douglas DC-3 which makes the trip without stopping. However, the San Fernando de Atabapo airport in Venezuela is just 30 km away. There is also a cargo airline that flies twice a week from Bogotà only. The airport was formerly known as Aeropuerto Obando.

It is also possible to get to Inírida by river, but the trip takes hours or days and costs almost as much as a flight.

=== Public transportation ===
With the arrival of more and more people, a public transportation mechanism has been established. Around 500 auto rickshaws provide an efficient and inexpensive means of transportation. The standard fare (which covers almost all the destinations within the town) is around US $.50. There are also mini-vans available for large groups; the fare remains US $.50 per person.
