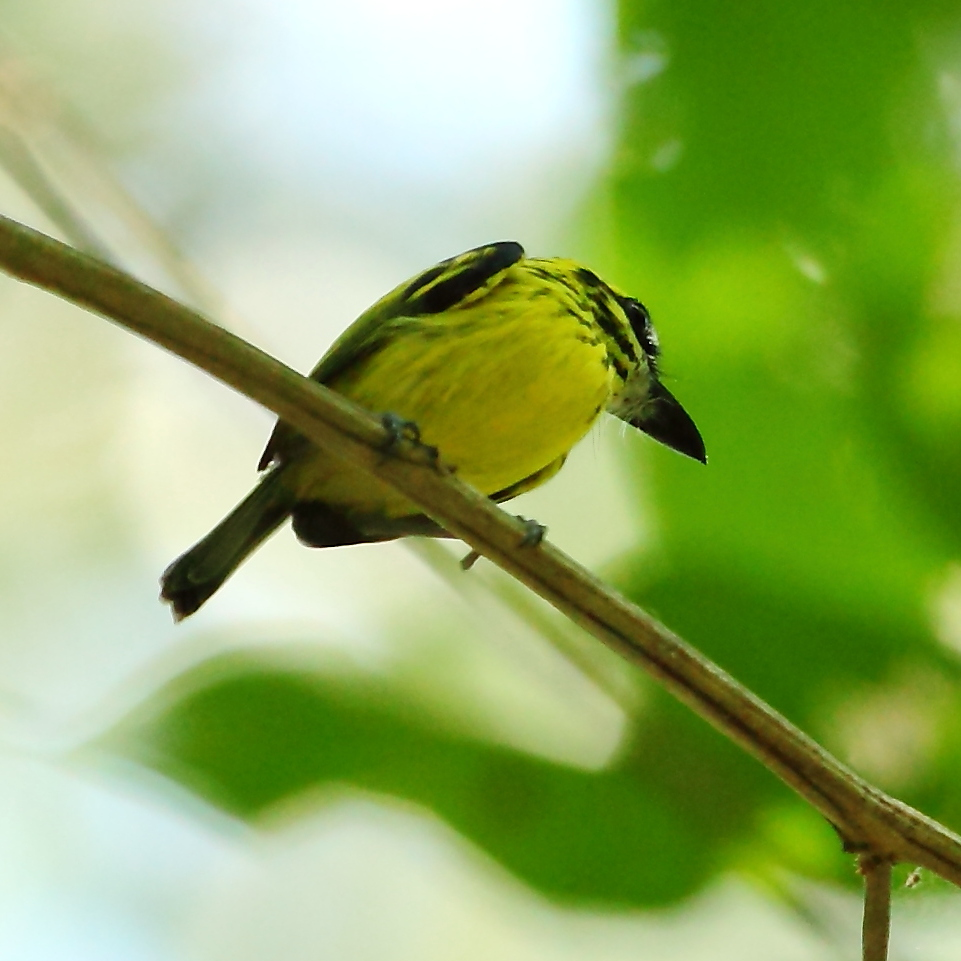
- At Iranduba, Amazonas State, Brazil

Conservation status
- Least Concern (IUCN 3.1)

Scientific classification
- Kingdom: Animalia
- Phylum: Chordata
- Class: Aves
- Order: Passeriformes
- Family: Tyrannidae
- Genus: Todirostrum
- Species: T. chrysocrotaphum

Binomial name
- Todirostrum chrysocrotaphum Strickland, 1850

= Yellow-browed tody-flycatcher =

Species of bird

The yellow-browed tody-flycatcher (Todirostrum chrysocrotaphum) is a species of bird in the family Tyrannidae, the tyrant flycatchers. It is found in Bolivia, Brazil, Colombia, Ecuador, and Peru.

== Taxonomy and systematics ==
The yellow-browed tody-flycatcher was originally described in 1850 as a full species with its current binomial Todirostrum chrysocrotaphum.

The yellow-browed tody-flycatcher has these five subspecies:

- T. c. guttatum Pelzeln, 1868
- T. c. neglectum Carriker, 1932
- T. c. chrysocrotaphum Strickland, 1850
- T. c. simile Zimmer, JT, 1940
- T. c. illigeri (Cabanis & Heine, 1860)

Some mid-twentieth century authors considered the black-headed tody-flycatcher (T. nigriceps) and painted tody-flycatcher (T. pictum) as additional subspecies, but by the 1970s they had regained their status as full species. Several authors treat the three of them as a superspecies. In addition T. c. guttatum was originally described as a full species and continued to be treated that way into the early twentieth century by authors.

== Description ==
The yellow-browed tody-flycatcher is 8.6 to 10 cm (3.4 to 3.9 in) long and weighs about 7 g (0.25 oz). The sexes are alike. Adults of the nominate subspecies T. c. chrysocrotaphum have a mostly black head with a white spot above the lores and a wide yellow supercilium that extends to the nape. A faint narrow yellow band separates their nape from their olive back, rump, and uppertail coverts. Their wings are black with yellow edges on the flight feathers. The wing coverts have thin yellow edges and wide yellow tips; the latter show as two wing bars. Their tail is black. Their underparts are mostly bright yellow with thin black streaks on the side of the throat and across the breast. All subspecies have a dark brown iris, a black bill, and black or dark gray legs and feet.

The other subspecies of the yellow-browed tody-flycatcher differ from the nominate and each other thus:

- T. c. guttatum: white chin; heavier black streaks on the throat and breast than nominate
- T. c. neglectum: black lores; more yellowish olive upperparts and richer yellow underparts than nominate and with much less streaking
- T. c. simile: supercilium is only behind the eye; black of crown extends less onto the nape than on nominate; little or no yellow collar between black nape and olive upper back
- T. c. illigeri: no white spot above the lores; supercilium is only behind the eye; black stripe on lower cheek, and no streaks on the throat and breast

== Distribution and habitat ==
The yellow-browed tody-flycatcher is a bird of the western and central Amazon Basin. The subspecies are found thus:

- T. c. guttatum: from Meta to Guainía departments in southeastern Colombia, south thorough eastern Ecuador into northeastern Loreto Department in extreme northeastern Peru, and east into northwestern Brazil north of the Amazon to the Rio Negro
- T. c. neglectum: east-central and southeastern Peru, northern Bolivia, and western Brazil south of the Amazon east to the Rio Madeira
- T. c. chrysocrotaphum: northern Peru east into western Brazil south of the Amazon east to central Amazonas state
- T. c. simile: north-central Brazil south of the Amazon on left bank of the Rio Tapajós in western Pará
- T. c. illigeri: northeastern Brazil south of the Amazon from right bank of the Tapajós into northern Maranhão

The yellow-browed tody-flycatcher inhabits humid terra firme and várzea forest, mature secondary forest, and clearings within forest as long as they have some tall trees. It generally remains in the forest canopy. In elevation it ranges from sea level to 1,400 m (4,600 ft) in Brazil. It reaches only 600 m (2,000 ft) in Colombia and Ecuador and 1,000 m (3,300 ft) in Peru.

== Behavior ==
=== Movement ===
The yellow-browed tody-flycatcher is believed to be a year-round resident.

=== Feeding ===
The yellow-browed tody-flycatcher feeds on insects, though details are lacking. It typically forages singly or in pairs and rarely joins mixed-species feeding flocks. It mostly forages in the forest canopy and along its edges. It primarily takes prey from foliage and twigs with short upward and outward sallies from a perch.

=== Breeding ===
The yellow-browed tody-flycatcher's breeding season varies geographically. It spans at least April to July in Ecuador, includes June in Colombia, and includes November in eastern Brazil. Both members of a pair build the nest, a globe made from plant fibers, and hanging from a branch. Nests have been documented between 4 and 35 m (15 and 115 ft) above the ground. Some are built near the nest of paper wasps. The clutch size is believed to be two eggs. The incubation period, time to fledging, and details of parental care are not known.

=== Vocalization ===
The yellow-browed tody-flycatcher's song has been described as a far-carrying "series of sharp emphatic 'tsip' notes" numbering eight to twelve. Another author describes it as "an easily overlooked, insectlike high, accelerating chipping series: tchit... tchit... tchit tchit tchit tchit-tchit-tchit-tchit-tchit".

== Status ==
The IUCN has assessed the yellow-browed tody-flycatcher as being of Least Concern. It has a very large range; its population size is not known and is believed to be decreasing. No immediate threats have been identified. It is considered common in Colombia, "locally fairly common" in Ecuador, and "fairly common" in Peru.
