= Christian Bodegren =

Swedish explorer

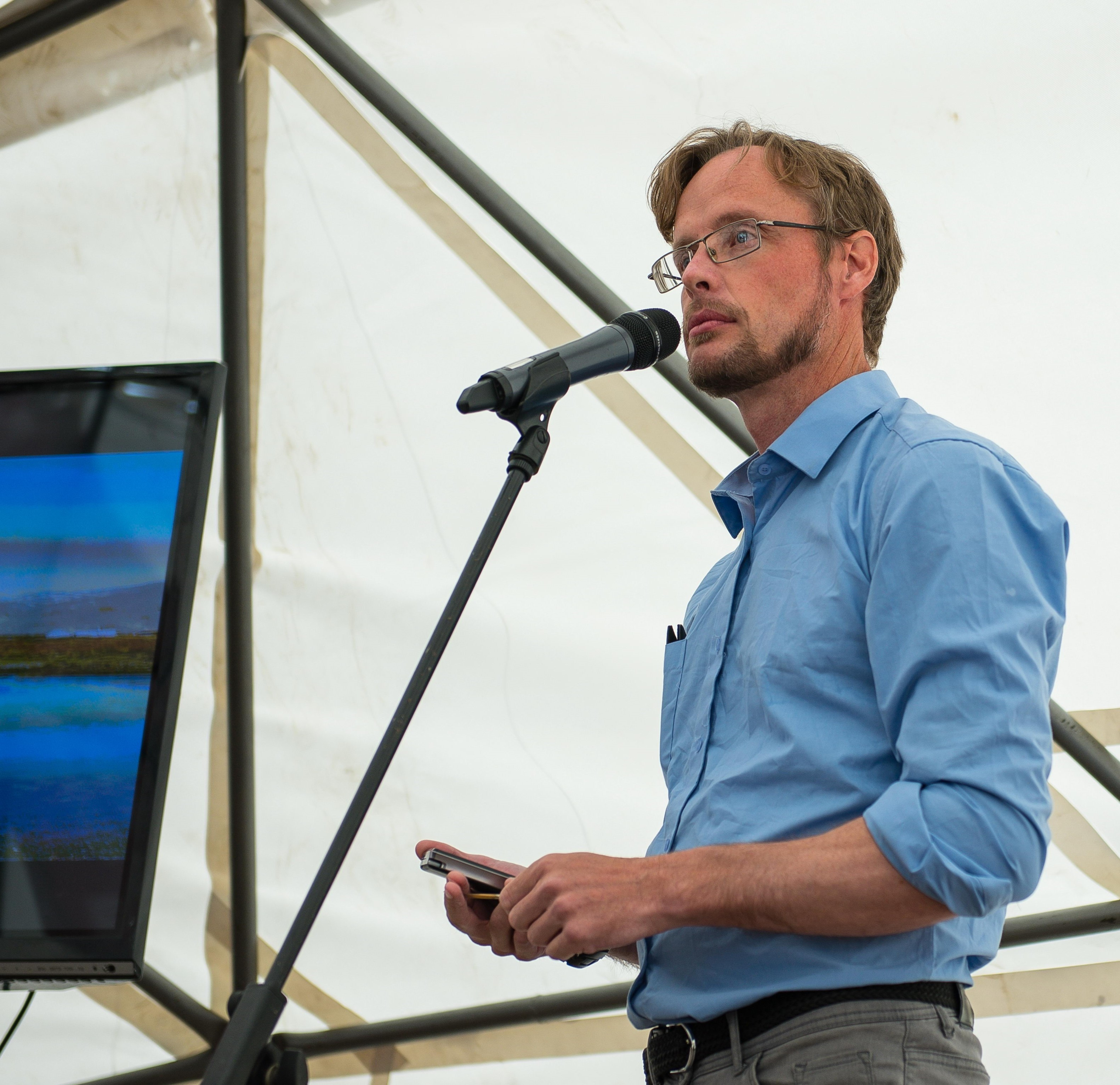
- Born: Christian Håkan Bodegren; 4 August 1973 (age 52); Katrineholm, Sweden.
- Known for: Expeditions in the World.

Christian Håkan Bodegren (born 4 August 1973, in Katrineholm, Sweden), is a Swedish adventurer, explorer, and lecturer.

== Expeditions ==
=== Through the Sahara ===
During 7 months 2009–2010, Bodegren conducted an expedition through the Sahara Desert, from east to west, with four dromedaries. The start took place at the Red Sea in Egypt. During the walk, he was badly bitten in the neck by one of the dromedaries. A closed border with Algeria in southern Libya and a failed attempt to get to Algeria through Tunisia, eventually forced him to sell his dromedaries. This sale turned out to be illegal and he was sentenced in court to 5 years of exile from Tunisia. A short while later, the Arab Spring began and the expedition ended without reaching his final goal. Despite this, he was nominated for the 2010 adventurer of the year in Sweden.

=== Through South America in a kayak ===
2011-2012 he paddled kayak solo for 280 days on various river systems through the South American continent, from Orinoco's river delta in Venezuela to Argentina and Rio de la plata. His route went through the following river systems: Orinoco, Atabapo River, Termi River, Guainía River, Negro River, Amazon River, Madeira River, Mamore River, Guaphore River, Paraguay River, Paraná River, Tigre and Rio de la Plata. He also paddled through one of the world's largest wetlands: Pantanal in Mato Grosso. Of this about 9 months paddle trip, 5 months consisted of countercurrent paddling. It has been described as the longest solo paddling in a kayak through the South American continent in the history. This became Bodegren's international breakthrough and awarded him a Best of ExplorersWeb 2012 Award in the US, and he was named Swedish Adventurer of the Year 2012. He also received two heavy nominations in the US and Europe. Guinness's record book also contacted him and wanted to highlight Bodegren's kayak performance.
However, he refused.

=== Through Mongolia and Kazakhstan ===
In 2016–2017, Bodegren wandered for one year with Bactrian Camel through Mongolia and Kazakhstan to the Caspian Sea. The hike started in Mongolia south of Ulan Bator in Bayan-Unjuul and ended at the Caspian Sea near the village of Zhanbay in Kazakhstan. He also passed the Ural River in Kazakhstan, which is the river that forms the border between Asia and Europe. During the expedition, he traveled 5,095 km (3,166 mi) with two camels, one in each country.

It has been counted as the longest solo hike with Bactrian camels in modern times. During the journey, he was accepted as a member of the prestigious Explorers' club in New York City in the United States, and his expedition was the subject of a very large media interest in Kazakhstan.

== Nominations and awards ==
- 2011 - Nominated for Adventure of the Year 2010 in Sweden.
- 2013 - This year's Adventurer 2012 in Sweden.
- 2013 - Best of ExplorersWeb 2012 Award in USA.
- 2013 - Nominated for CKAwards 2012 Expedition of the Year in USA.
- 2013 - Nominated for The European Adventurer of the Year 2012.
- 2017 - Become a member of The Explorers Club.
- 2018 - This year's Adventurer 2017 in Sweden.
- 2019 - Become one of the coolest Swedish explorers in history.
