= Penicillium wotroi =

Scientific classification
- Domain: Eukaryota
- Kingdom: Fungi
- Division: Ascomycota
- Class: Eurotiomycetes
- Order: Eurotiales
- Family: Aspergillaceae
- Genus: Penicillium
- Species: P. wotroi

Binomial name
- Penicillium wotroi Houbraken, C. López, Frisvad & Samson 2011

Type strain
- CBS 118171

Species of fungus

Penicillium wotroi is a species of fungus in the genus Penicillium which was isolated from soil in the Colombian Amazon forest.
