= Penicillium elleniae =

Scientific classification
- Domain: Eukaryota
- Kingdom: Fungi
- Division: Ascomycota
- Class: Eurotiomycetes
- Order: Eurotiales
- Family: Aspergillaceae
- Genus: Penicillium
- Species: P. elleniae

Binomial name
- Penicillium elleniae Houbraken, C. López, Frisvad & Samson 2011

Species of fungus

Penicillium elleniae is a species of the genus of Penicillium which was isolated from the Colombian Amazon forest.

== See also ==
- List of Penicillium species
