= Paraguachón =

- Location within Colombia
- Coordinates: 11°21′40″N 72°08′08″W
- Country: Colombia
- Region: Caribbean
- Department: La Guajira
- Municipality: Maicao
- Time zone: UTC-5
- Area code: 57 + 5
- Climate: Aw

Paraguachón (Wayuu: Paalüwachon) is a populated center of Colombia and corregimiento located 8 km (5.0 mi) east of Maicao, the municipality in which it is located. It is located in the La Guajira Department, in northern Colombia. It is a town that is located on the margin of the border with Venezuela and is where the Transversal del Caribe ends.
