= Inírida River =

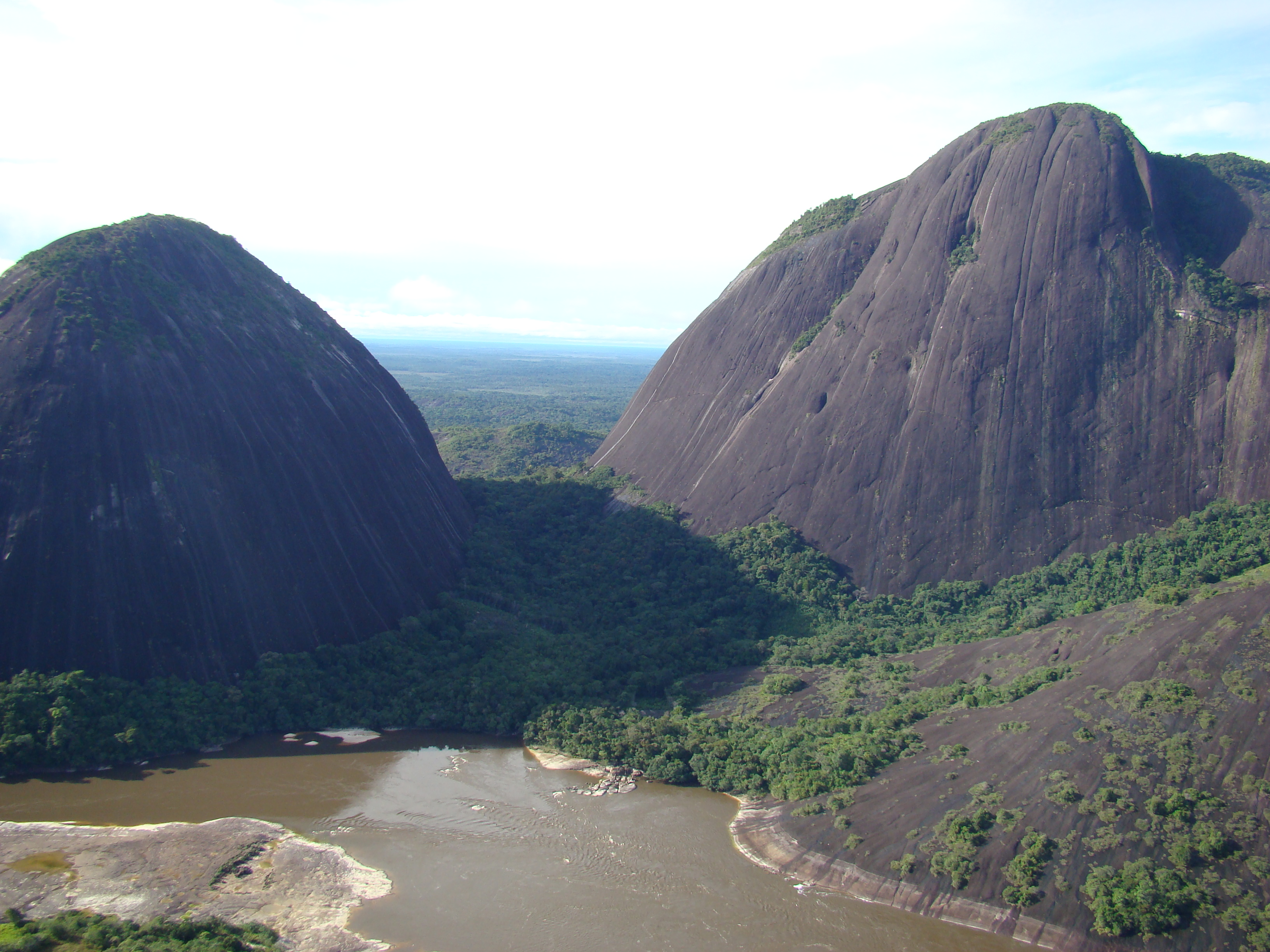
- The Inírida River below the Cerros de Mavecure

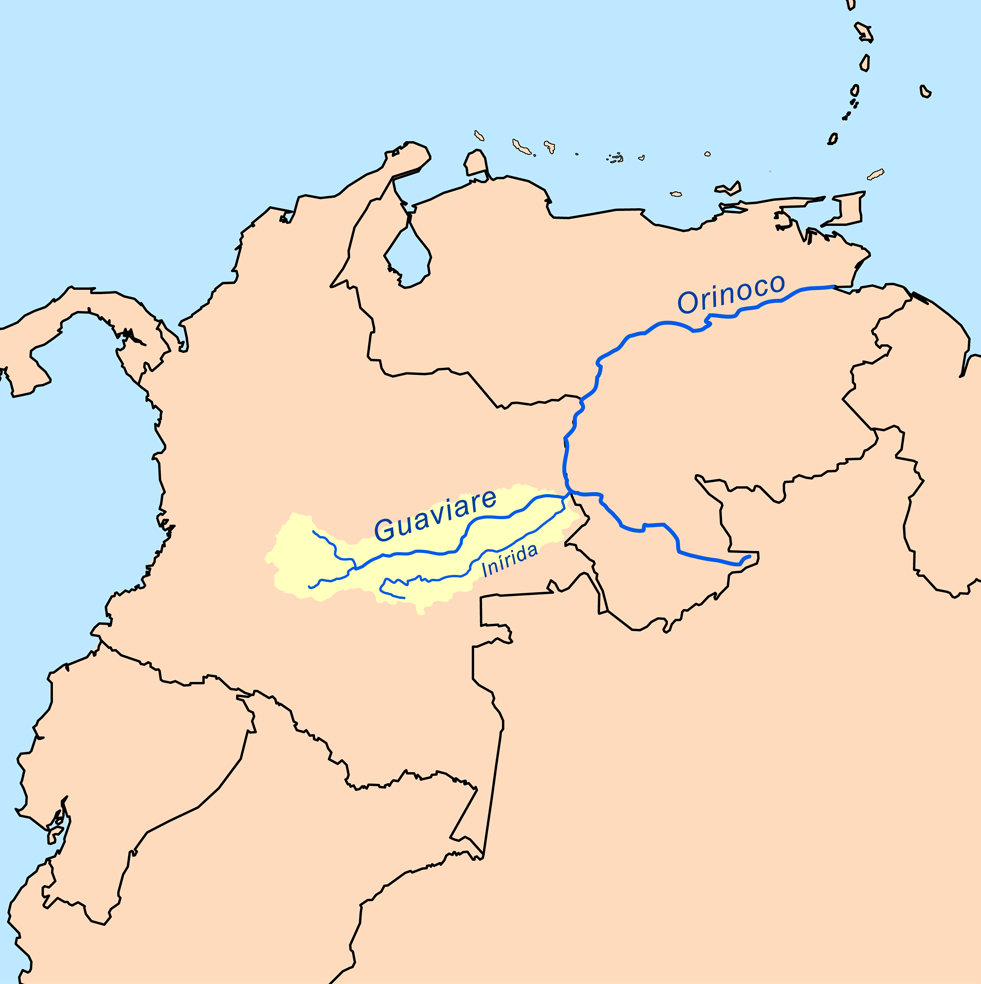
- Map of the Guaviare basin, highlighted in yellow, including the Inírida

Location
- Country: Colombia

Physical characteristics
- Source
  - location: Serranía de la Macarena
- Mouth
  - location: Guaviare River
  - coordinates: 3°51′57.01″N 67°55′42.74″W
  - elevation: 77 m (253 ft)
- Length: 1,300 km (810 mi)
- Basin size: 53,795 km^{2} (20,770 sq mi) to 53,816.9 km^{2} (20,778.8 sq mi)
- Discharge
  - location: Inírida, Colombia
  - average: 3,385 m^{3}/s (119,500 cu ft/s) to 2,948.4 m^{3}/s (104,120 cu ft/s)

The Inírida (Spanish pronunciation: [iˈniɾiða], Spanish: Río Inírida) is a river in the north-west of South America, in the territory of Colombia, the largest tributary of the Guaviare (the Orinoco River basin).

The length of the river is 1,300 km (810 mi), 1,000 km (620 mi) of which are navigable for small vessels. There are rapids and waterfalls in the upper and middle courses of the river. The river has a dark colour due to the abundance of plant residues.

It originates in the Tuhani mountains in the department of Guaviare, 25 km (16 mi) from Cerro Pintado. In the upper course it flows first to the west, then turns to the east, on the plain it flows in a northeasterly direction. The river mouth is located in the department of Guainía near the town of Inírida, about 25 km (16 mi) from the border with Venezuela. The Guaviare River takes waters of the Inírida, then flows north-east for 25 km (16 mi), and together with the Atabapo River merges with the Orinoco near the city of San Fernando de Atabapo.

== See also ==
- List of rivers of Colombia
