= La Guadalupe =

Coordinates: 1°14′49″N 66°51′52″W

- Municipality and town
- Location of the municipality and town of La Guadalupe in the Guainía Department of Colombia.
- Country: Colombia
- Department: Guainía Department

Area
  - Municipality and town: 6,457 km^{2} (2,493 sq mi)
- Elevation: 80 m (260 ft)

Population
  - Municipality and town: 358
  - Urban: 326
- Time zone: UTC-5 (Colombia Standard Time)

La Guadalupe (Spanish pronunciation: [la ɣwaðaˈlupe]) is a village and municipality in the Guainía Department, Colombia. La Guadalupe borders the corregimiento of San Felipe on the north, Brazil on the south and west, and Venezuela on the East.
