= Guayabero River =

River in Colombia

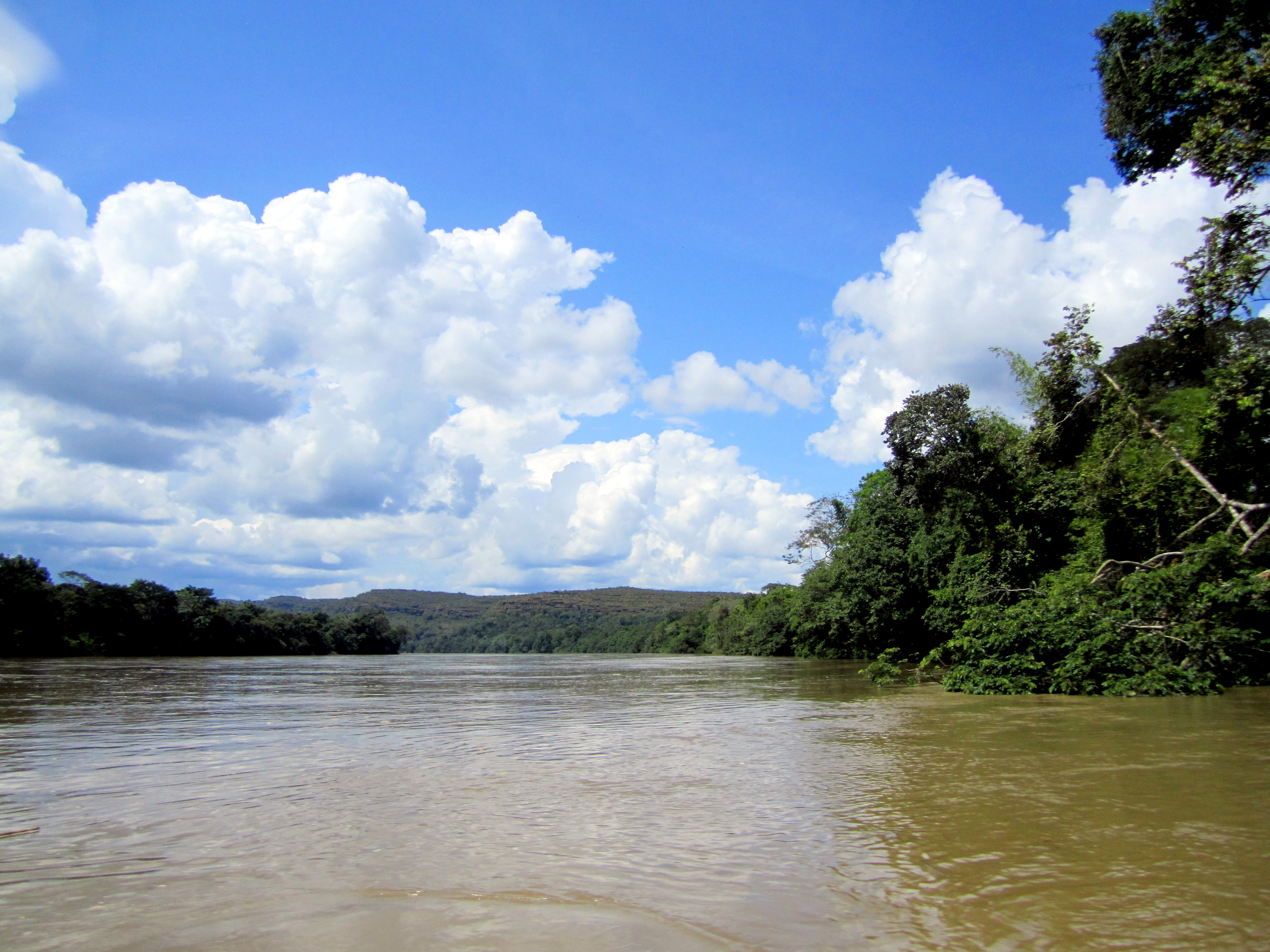
- Guayabero River just west of La Macarena, Meta

Location
- Country: Colombia

Physical characteristics
- Mouth
  - location: 2.5787°N 72.7692°W

The Guayabero River is a river of Colombia. It is primarily located in the Meta Department, forming a portion of its border with the Guaviare Department. It is part of the Orinoco River basin. Its confluence with the Ariari River gives rise to the Guaviare River, one of the Orinoco's largest tributaries.

== See also ==
- List of rivers of Colombia
