= Sinchi Amazonic Institute of Scientific Research =

Colombian research institute

Amazonian Scientific Research Institute SINCHI

Agency overview
- Formed: 22 December 1993
- Preceding agency: Colombian Corporation for the Amazon Araracuara
- Jurisdiction: Amazon Region of Colombia
- Headquarters: Avenida Vásquez Cobo entre calles 15 y 16 Leticia, Amazonas, Colombia
- Annual budget: COP$6,975,782,709 (est. 2008); COP$9,062,00,000 (est. 2009)
- Agency executive: Luz Marina Mantilla Cárdenas, Director
- Parent agency: Ministry of Environment and Sustainable Development
- Website: www.sinchi.org.co

The Amazonian Scientific Research Institute SINCHI (Spanish: Instituto Amazónico de Investigaciones Científicas SINCHI) is a non-profit research institute of the Government of Colombia charged with carrying out scientific investigations on matters relating to the Amazon rainforest, the Amazon River and the Amazon Region of Colombia for its better understanding and protection. The word SINCHI, is a word in Quechua that means "strong" or "fierce".

SINCHI INSTITUTE FUNCTIONS

Obtain, store, analyze, study, process, supply and disseminate basic information on the biological, social and ecological reality of the Amazon region for the management and use of renewable natural resources and the environment of the region.

2. Contribute to stabilize colonization processes by studying and evaluating the impact of their intervention on the ecosystems and the development of technological alternatives for their utilization within the criteria of sustainability.

3. Monitor the state of the natural resources of the Amazon, especially in terms of extinction, pollution and degradation.

4. Collaboration with the Ministry of Environment and Sustainable Development in accordance with its guidelines and policies and the Intersectoral Council for Amazon region Research, in the promotion, creation and coordination of a network of Amazonian research centers. Within this network, in addition to the Intitutute of the Environment and Sustainable Development, all the public or private institutions of other sectors that carry out research in Amazon related topics.

5. Coordinate the Environmental Information System within the limits of the priorities, guidelines and policies defined by the Ministry of Environment and Sustainable Development.

6. To provide the Ministry of Environment and Sustainable Development, IDEAM and the Corporations the information they deems necessary.

7. Support to the Ministry of the Environment and Sustainable Development in the coordination of the management of information on the relations between the economic and social sectors and of the processes and resources of the Amazon.

8. To serve, in coordination with IDEAM, as a support agency for the Ministry of Environment and Sustainable Development for the creation of National Environmental Accounts in relation to Amazon region resources and ecosystems.

9. Collaborate with the Ministry of Environment and Sustainable Development and the Corporations and territories of the region in the definition of variables to be included in the environmental impact studies of projects, works or activities that affect Amazon region ecosystems.

10. Collaborate with the studies on global environmental change and in particular those that allow us to analyze the participation of the intervention processes carried out in the Colombian Amazon to this global environmental change and in all the activities set forth by the Ministry of Environment and Sustainable Development in the development of international environmental policy.

11. To collaborate with the Ministry of Agriculture and with the National Council of Science and Technology in the promotion, elaboration and execution of research projects and transfer of agricultural technology under the criterion of sustainability.

12. Support the Ministry of Environment and Sustainable Development to fulfill the commitments and the development of the activities derived from Colombia's participation in international organizations, in matters within its competence.

13. Promote the development and dissemination of knowledge, values and technologies on the management of natural resources of the ethnic groups of the Amazon region. In this type of research, the use of participatory and action research schemes that favor the participation of communities should be encouraged.

14. To research the biological and ecological reality of the Amazon, to propose alternative models of sustainable development based on the use of its natural resources. These activities will be carried out in coordination with Research Corporations of the agricultural sector in search of technologies and production systems and alternative uses that allow advancement in the development of a sustainable agriculture.

15. Develop coordination activities with the other scientific institutes linked to the Ministry of the Environment and Sustainable Development and to support it and IDEAM in the management of information.

16. Produce an annual report on the state of ecosystems and the environment in the Amazon region.

17. Provide technical bases for the environmental ordering of the Amazon region territory.

18. Collaborate with the National Council of Environmental Sciences and Habitat, with the Amazon Science Mission with the CORPES of the Amazon in the development of their activities.

19. To advance and promote the inventory of Amazon region fauna and flora, to establish the collections, data banks and research necessary for the development of national biodiversity policies, in collaboration with the Alexander Von Humboldt Biological Resources Research Institute.

20. Any others that the law and the statutes grant it for the fulfillment of its social object.
