= Ariari River =

River in Colombia

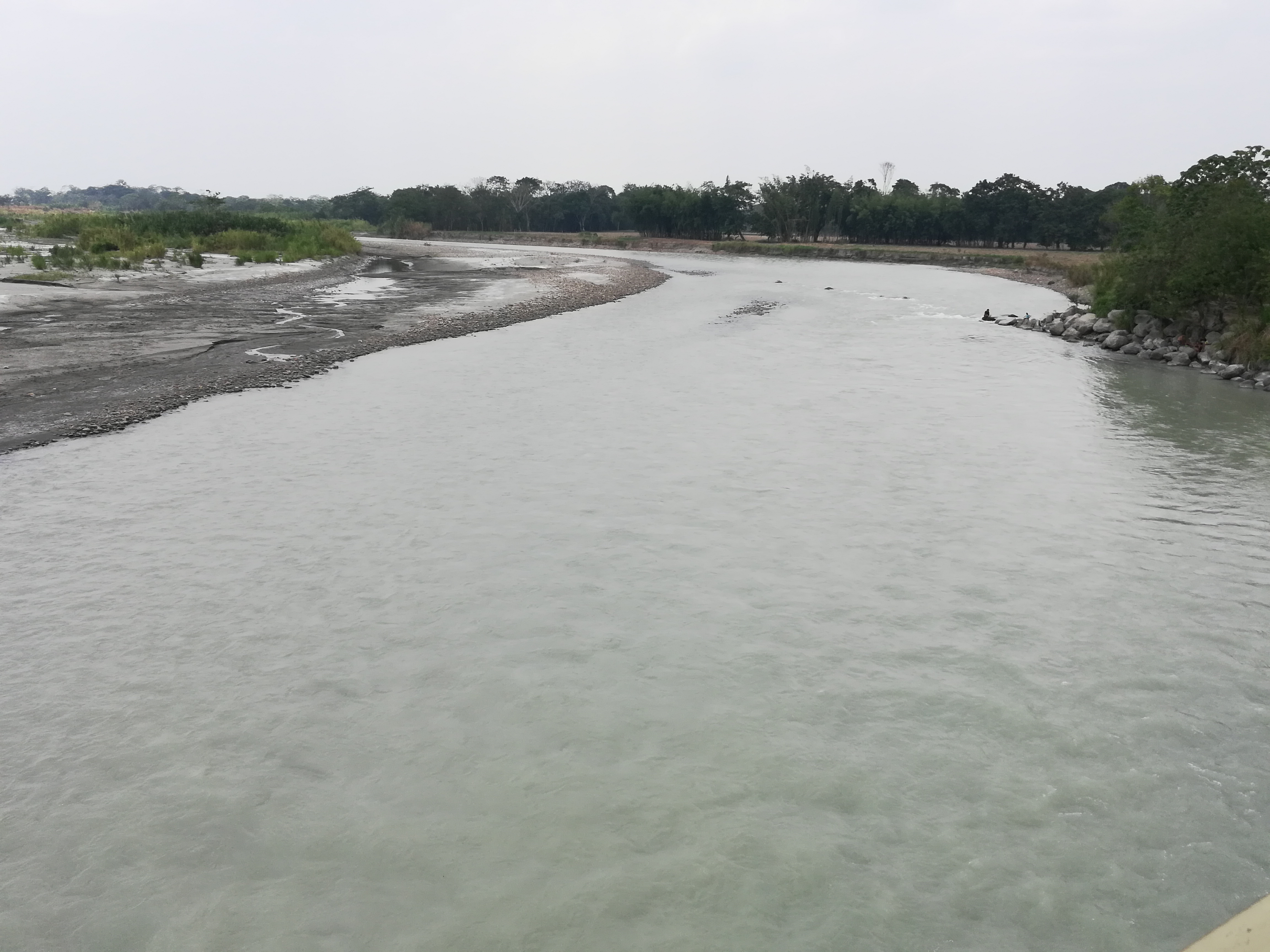

Location
- Country: Colombia

Physical characteristics
- Mouth
  - location: 2.5787°N 72.7692°W

The Ariari River is a river of Colombia, located entirely within the Meta Department. Part of the Orinoco River basin, it merges with the Guayabero River to form the Guaviare River, one of the principle tributaries of the Orinoco.

== See also ==
- List of rivers of Colombia
