= Morichal Nuevo =

Coordinates: 2.21667°N 70.0333°W

- Municipality and town
- Location of the municipality and town of Morichal Nuevo in the Guainía Department of Colombia.
- Country: Colombia
- Department: Guainía Department
- Time zone: UTC-5 (Colombia Standard Time)

Morichal Nuevo is a town and municipality in the Guainía Department, Republic of Colombia.
