= Barrancominas =

- Municipality and town
- Flag

- Location of Barranco Minas in the Guainía Department of Colombia. It is located at 3° 29' North, 69° 48' West.
- Coordinates: 03°29′N 69°48′W
- Country: Colombia
- Department: Guainía Department
- Time zone: UTC-5 (Colombia Standard Time)

Barrancominas is a town and municipality located in the Guainía Department, Republic of Colombia. It has the Barranco Minas Airport.
