= Cacahual =

- Municipality and town
- Location of the municipality and town of Cacahual in the Guainía Department of Colombia.
- Coordinates: 3°31′34″N 67°24′46″W
- Country: Colombia
- Department: Guainía Department
- Time zone: UTC-5 (Colombia Standard Time)

Cacahual (Spanish pronunciation: [kakaˈwal]) is a town and municipality located in the Guainía Department, Republic of Colombia.
