= Cerros de Mavecure =

Three hills in eastern Colombia

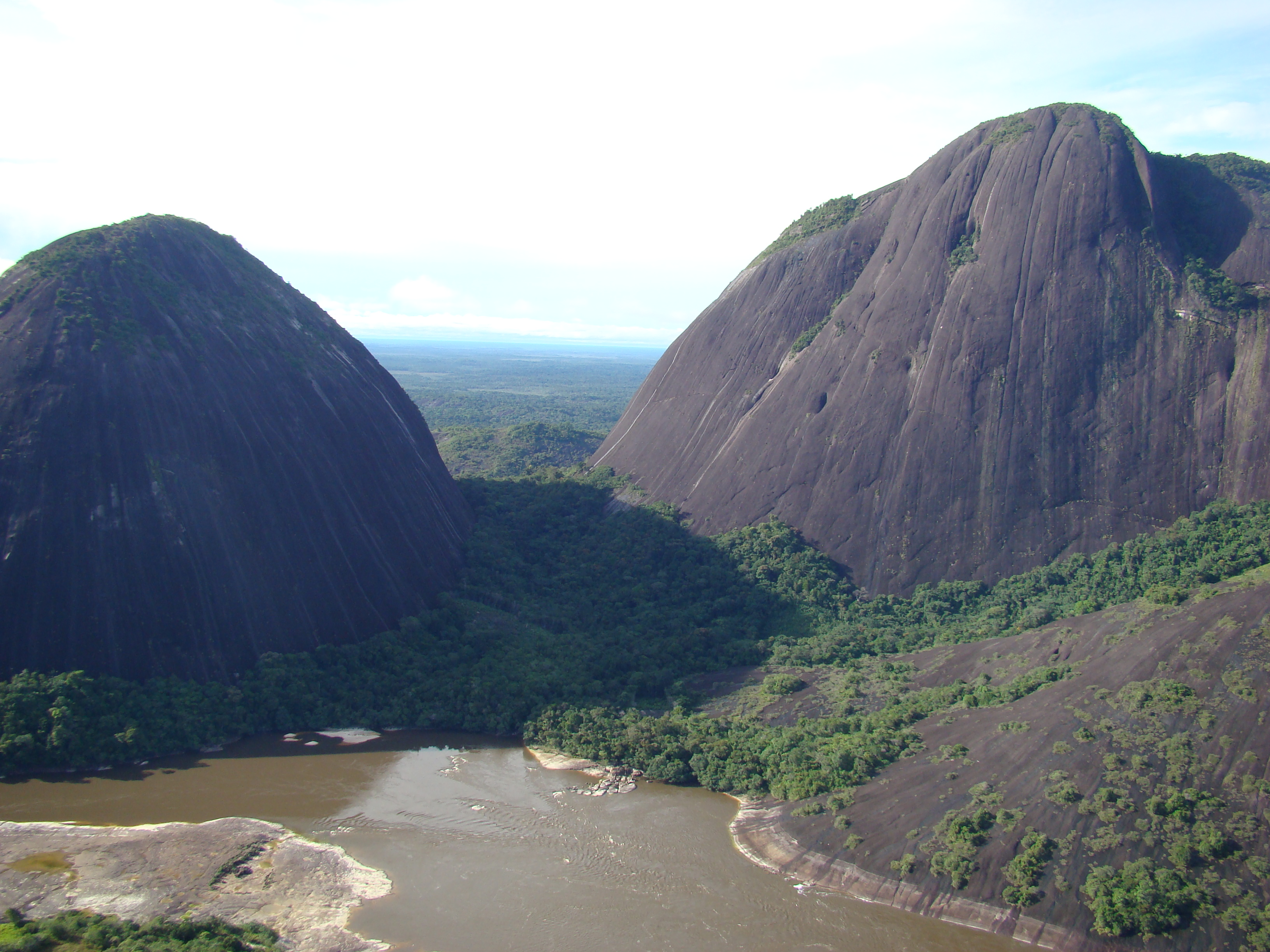
- Cerros de Mavecure

Highest point
- Elevation: Pajarito: 712 m (2,336 ft); Mono: 480 m (1,575 ft); Mavicure: 170 m (558 ft)
- Coordinates: 03°28′00″N 67°58′30″W

Geography
- Location within Colombia
- Location: Guainía, Colombia

Geology
- Rock age: Precambrian

Ramsar Wetland
- Designated: 8 July 2014

The Cerros de Mavicuri are three hills, located in eastern Colombia, 50 km (31 mi) south of the city of Inírida on the Inírida River. Geologically, the mountains are part of the Guiana Shield.

Mavicuri is considered a sacred site by multiple ethnic groups residing in the area. Its name means "mountains of the blowgun", named after the tool used by the natives to catch prey.

The three mountains are called Pajarito (Little Bird), Mono (Monkey) and Mavicuri and are 712 m (2,336 ft), 480 m (1,570 ft), and 365 m (1,198 ft) respectively. They are made of granite rock and can only be accessed by river.

These mountains are considered one of the main tourist sites in the Department of Guainía and are located within a Puinave indigenous reserve.

== Popular culture ==
The Cerros de Mavicure are featured in the film Embrace of the Serpent. The Governor of the Guainía Department decorated Ciro Guerra, the director of the film, with the Order of the Inrida Flower for highlighting the land feature in the film.
