= Amazon natural region =

Region in Colombia

Amazon region

Ecology
- Realm: Neotropic
- Biome: Rainforest, Wetlands

Geography
- Country: Colombia
- Coordinates: 1°N 72°W
- Rivers: Caquetá, Putumayo, Amazon
- Climate type: Tropical

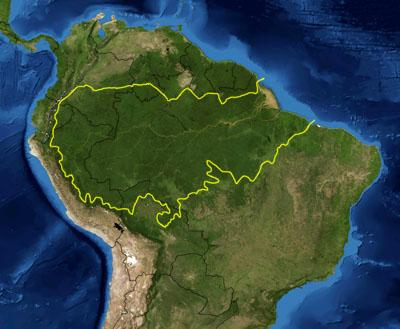
The Amazon Region of Colombia is part of the Amazon rainforest.

Amazon natural region in southern Colombia comprises the departments of Amazonas, Caquetá, Guainía, Guaviare, Putumayo and Vaupés, and covers an area of 483,000 square kilometres (186,000 sq mi), 35% of Colombia's total territory. The region is mostly covered by tropical rainforest, or jungle, which is a part of the greater Amazon rainforest.

== Biogeographical subregions ==
The region is bounded by the East Andes along the western edge and extends to the Venezuelan and Brazilian borders in the east. The northern limit begins with the Guaviare and Vichada Rivers and extends south to the Putumayo and Amazon Rivers.

The Amazon region is divided up into distinct subregions:

- Amazon foothills: bordering the East Andes
- Caquetá River Plain: the main watershed of this region
- Inírida River Plain: location of the famous Cerros de Mavecure
- Guaviare River Plain: shared with the Eastern Plains
- Putumayo River Plain: along the southern border
- Serranía de Chiribiquete
- Amazon Trapezium: the area of land that actually borders with the Amazon River

Other important rivers include the Vaupés, Apaporis and Yarí.

== Biodiversity ==
The tropical rainforest, classified more specifically as a tropical moist broadleaf forest. Within the Colombian Amazon region, there are five moist forest ecoregions:

- Caquetá moist forests: the largest part of the Colombian Amazon region centered on the Caquetá, Vaupés, Yarí, and Apaporis Rivers
- Napo moist forests: the southwest corner of the Colombian Amazon region, which borders the Andes and includes the headwaters of the Caquetá and Putumayo Rivers
- Solimões-Japurá moist forests: in Colombia this ecoregion is centered on the Putumayo and Amazon Rivers
- Japurá-Solimões-Negro moist forests: this ecoregion barely extends into Colombia mainly around the Lower Vaupés and Negro Rivers
- Campinarana: this ecoregion of white sandy forest and swamps barely extends into Colombia around the Negro River in the Department of Vaupés

== Protected areas ==
- PNN Alto Fragua Indi-Wasi
- PNN Amacayacu
- PNN Cahuinarí
- PNN Serranía de Chiribiquete
- RNN Nukak
- PNN La Paya
- RNN Puinawai
- PNN ío Puré
- PNN Serranía de los Churumbelos Auka-Wasi
- PNN Tinigua
- PNN Yaigojé Apaporis

== See also ==
- Amazonas (Colombian department)
- Territorial Environmental Information System of the Colombian Amazon
