= San Felipe, Guainía =

Coordinates: 1.91306°N 67.06832°W

- Municipality and town
- Location of the municipality and town of San Felipe, Guainía in the Guainía Department of Colombia.
- Country: Colombia
- Department: Guainía Department
- Time zone: UTC-5 (Colombia Standard Time)

San Felipe is a town and municipality located in the Guainía Department, Republic of Colombia.
