= Guaviare River =

River in Colombia

Guaviare
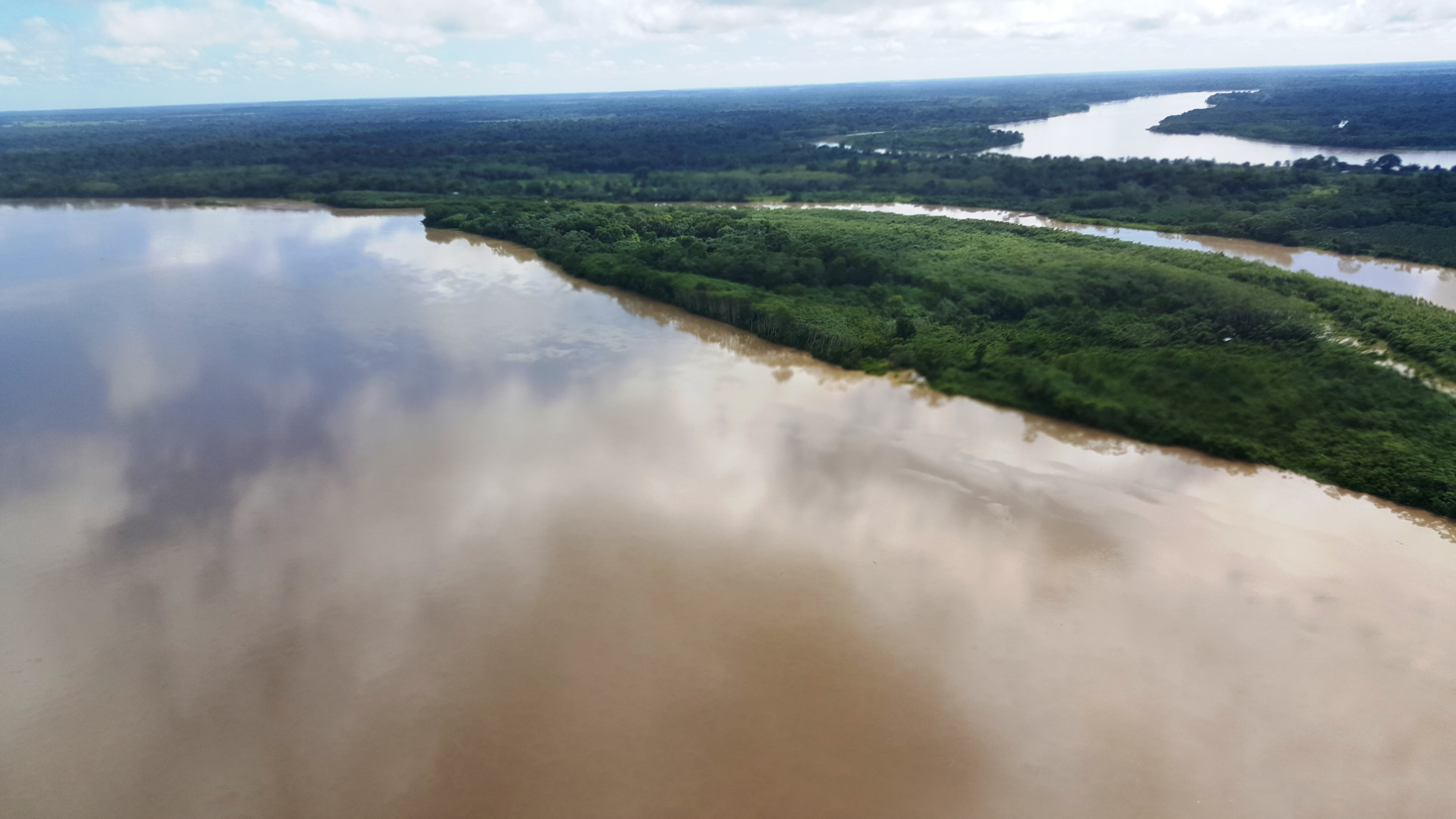
- The Guaviare River as seen from the air

Location
- Country: Colombia

Physical characteristics
- Source
  - location: Confluence of Ariari and Guayabero Rivers
  - coordinates: 2°34′52.9212″N 72°46′17.0328″W
  - elevation: 178 m (584 ft)
- 2nd source: Ariari
  - location: Cordillera Oriental
  - coordinates: 3°54′31.698″N 74°6′30.2004″W
  - elevation: 4,040 m (13,250 ft)
- 3rd source: Guayabero
  - location: Cordillera Oriental
  - coordinates: 3°31′36.5952″N 74°28′27.3684″W
  - elevation: 3,080 m (10,100 ft)
- Mouth
  - location: Orinoco
  - coordinates: 4°4′26.5656″N 67°43′14.8008″W
  - elevation: 77 m (253 ft)
- Length: 1,760 km (1,090 mi) - Guaviare–Guayabero
- Basin size: 151,606.9 km^{2} (58,535.8 sq mi)
- Discharge
  - location: Near mouth
  - average: (Period: 1926–2011)7,529 m^{3}/s (265,900 cu ft/s)
- Discharge
  - location: Coayare (3°57′30.3876″N 67°50′5.748″W; Basin size: 138,899.1 km^{2} (53,629.2 sq mi)
  - average: (Period: 1985–2015)6,778.9 m^{3}/s (239,390 cu ft/s)
  - minimum: (Year: 1994)826 m^{3}/s (29,200 cu ft/s)
  - maximum: (Year: 1988)15,906 m^{3}/s (561,700 cu ft/s)
- Discharge
  - location: San José del Guaviare (Basin size: 36,287.3 km^{2} (14,010.6 sq mi)
  - average: (Period: 1971–2000)1,594.8 m^{3}/s (56,320 cu ft/s)

Basin features
- Progression: Orinoco → Atlantic Ocean
- River system: Orinoco River
- Tributaries
  - left: Ariari, Caño El Melón, Ovejas, Caño Jabón, Siare, Iteviare, Caño Cumaral, Uvá
  - right: Guayabero, Caño Macú, Caño Araguato, Caño Mina, Caño Minisiare, Inírida, Atabapo

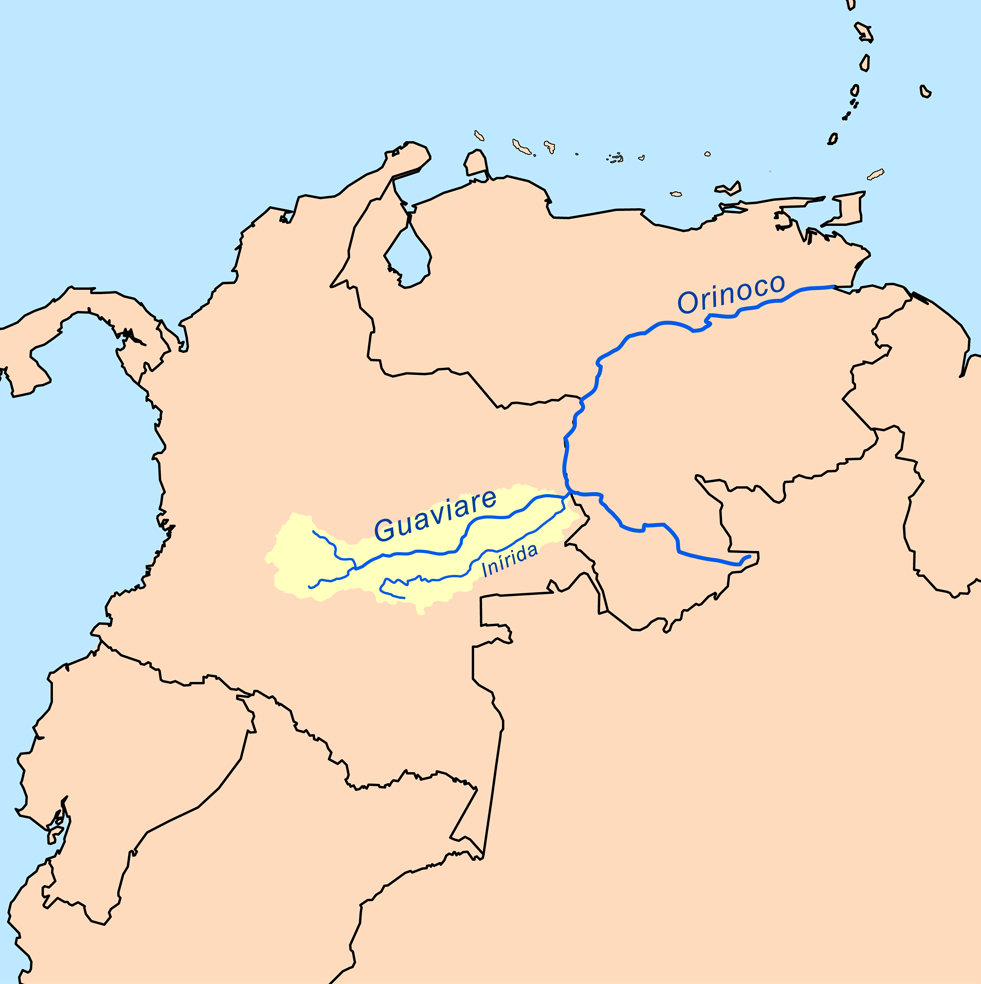

The Guaviare is a tributary of the Orinoco in Colombia. It flows together with the upper Orinoco (until here also called Río Parágua), which it clearly surpasses in length (altogether about 1,760 km) and water flow. Thus, the Guaviare is hydrologically the main stream of the Orinoco system.

The Guaviare has its source in two other rivers, the Ariari and the Guayabero, which in turn have their own sources in the eastern part of the Andes. At 1,760 km (1,090 mi) long, it is the longest tributary of the Orinoco and is navigable for 630 km (390 mi) of its total length. The Guaviare is considered the border between the Llanos and the Amazon rainforest. Its main tributary is the Inírida River.

== Discharge ==
Average, minimum and maximum discharge at Coayare (Guayare), 3°57′30.3876″N 67°50′5.748″W (Lower Guaviare). Period: 1985–2015.

Year	Discharge (m^{3}/s)		
Year	Min	Mean	Max
1985	1,206.5	6,426.17	12,716
1986	2,006.7	6,687.58	12,885
1987	1,620.4	7,063.17	12,664
1988	2,140	6,415.83	15,906
1989	2,674	6,843.67	15,800
1990	2,237	7,433.17	15,274
1991	850	6,999.33	14,910
1992	964	5,893.83	13,866
1993	1,031	7,613.92	13,229
1994	826	7,025.67	13,722
1995	1,663	6,014.08	12,689
1996	1,565	6,928.83	13,413
1997	2,232	6,634.5	11,841
1998	2,342	7,370.42	13,281
1999	2,775	7,311.92	11,574
2000	1,605	6,894.33	14,291
2001	1,835	6,289.17	14,500
2002	1,081	5,716.25	13,978
2003	921.1	7,002.83	13,319
2004	938.8	7,087.42	14,483
2005	1,381	6,411.08	14,500
2006	1,598	7,227	14,256
2007	962.4	7,149.92	14,201
2008	1,177	6,649.83	13,860
2009	1,795	5,806.42	14,465
2010	891.6	6,587.75	13,270
2011	1,356	7,036	13,030
2012	1,780	7,183.33	15,157
2013	1,111	6,941.17	14,100
2014	1,016	7,050.83	14,830
2015	1,613	6,449.67	14,500
Avg.	1,522.4	6,778.9	13,877.4

Average discharge

Period	Discharge	Ref.
Near mouth 4°4′26.5656″N 67°43′14.8008″W
1926–2011	7,529 m^{3}/s (265,900 cu ft/s)	
1971–2000	8,157.9 m^{3}/s (288,090 cu ft/s)	
1974–2008	8,416 m^{3}/s (297,200 cu ft/s)	
	7,400 m^{3}/s (260,000 cu ft/s) 8,200 m^{3}/s (290,000 cu ft/s)	
Coayare (Guayare) 3°57′30.3876″N 67°50′5.748″W
1971–2000	7,254.9 m^{3}/s (256,200 cu ft/s)	
1991–2020	7,389 m^{3}/s (260,900 cu ft/s)	
1985–2015	6,778.9 m^{3}/s (239,390 cu ft/s)	
	6,700 m^{3}/s (240,000 cu ft/s)	
	6,887 m^{3}/s (243,200 cu ft/s)	
San José del Guaviare
1971–2000	1,594.8 m^{3}/s (56,320 cu ft/s)	
	1,930 m^{3}/s (68,000 cu ft/s)	

Sediment load at mouth ca 30 million ton/year.

== Tributaries ==
The main tributaries from the mouth:

Left tributary	Right tributary	Length (km)	Basin size (km^{2})	^{*}Average discharge (m^{3}/s)
Guaviare		1,760	151,606.9	8,157.9
Lower Guaviare
	Atabapo	185	12,531.3	895
	Inírida	1,419	53,816.9	2,948.4
Uvá			14,813.9	782.6
Middle Guaviare
	Caño Minisiare		2,335.5	119.3
	Caño Mina		381.9	20
Caño Cumaral			391.5	21.3
Iteviare			4,618	221.3
Siare			4,574.5	197.9
Caño Araguato			712.3	38.5
	Caño Macú		781.1	37
Caño Yamus			433	18.3
Caño Jabón			1,246.7	57.3
Ovejas			1,639.1	88.1
Caño El Melón			775.9	41
Upper Guaviare
Ariari			11,638.6	600.3
	Guayabero	540	24,345.9	986.2

^{*}1971–2000
