= Atabapo River =

Coordinates: 4°02′28″N 67°42′11″W

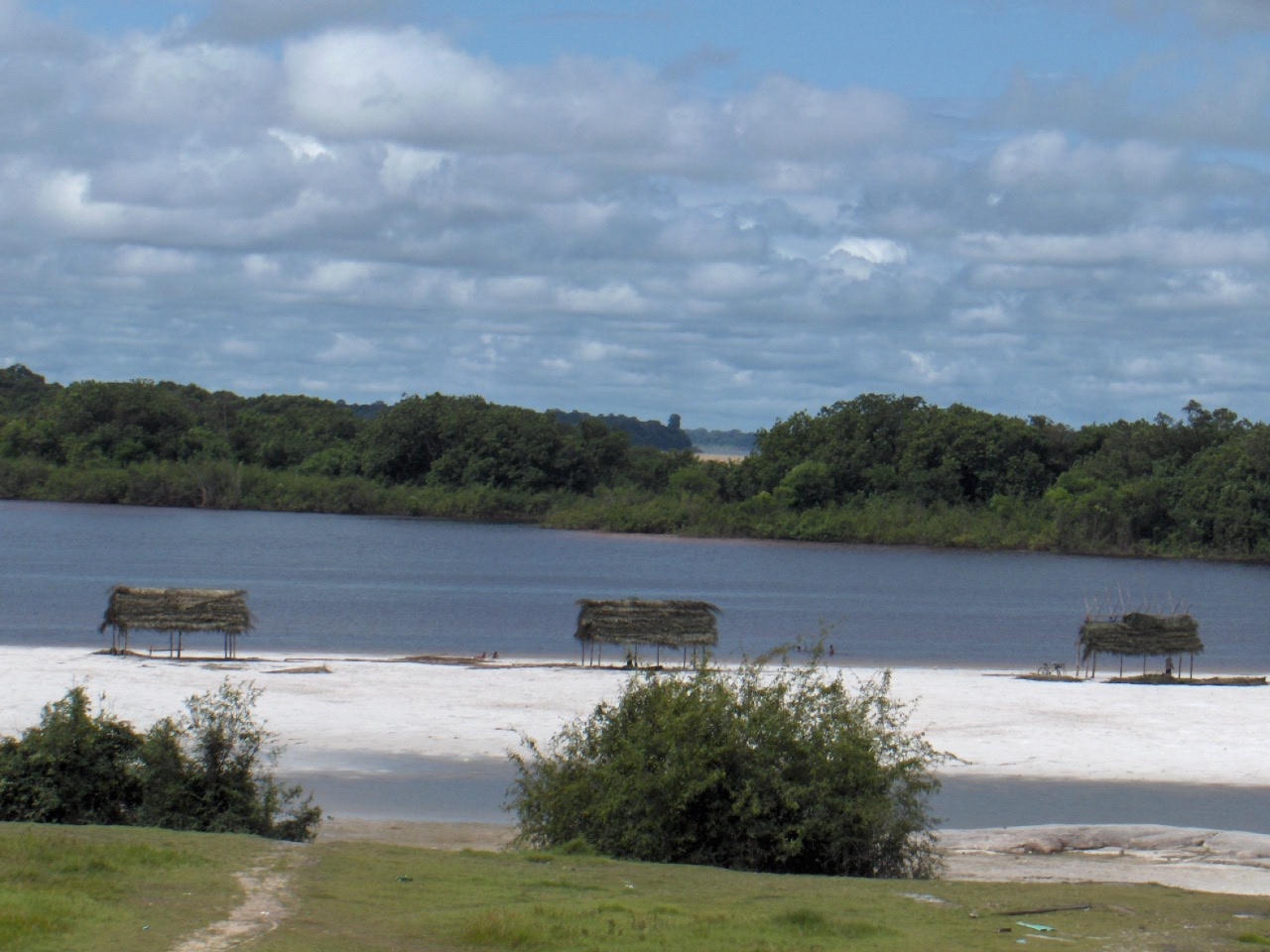

Location
- Countries: Colombia; Venezuela

Physical characteristics
- Length: 280 km (170 mi)
- Basin size: 13,000 km^{2} (5,000 sq mi)
- Discharge
  - average: 883 m^{3}/s (31,200 cu ft/s)

Atabapo River is a river of Venezuela and Colombia. It forms the international boundary between the two countries for much of its length. It is part of the Orinoco River basin.

== See also ==
- List of rivers of Venezuela
