= Guainía Department =

Department of Colombia

Department of Guainía Departamento de Guainía
- Department
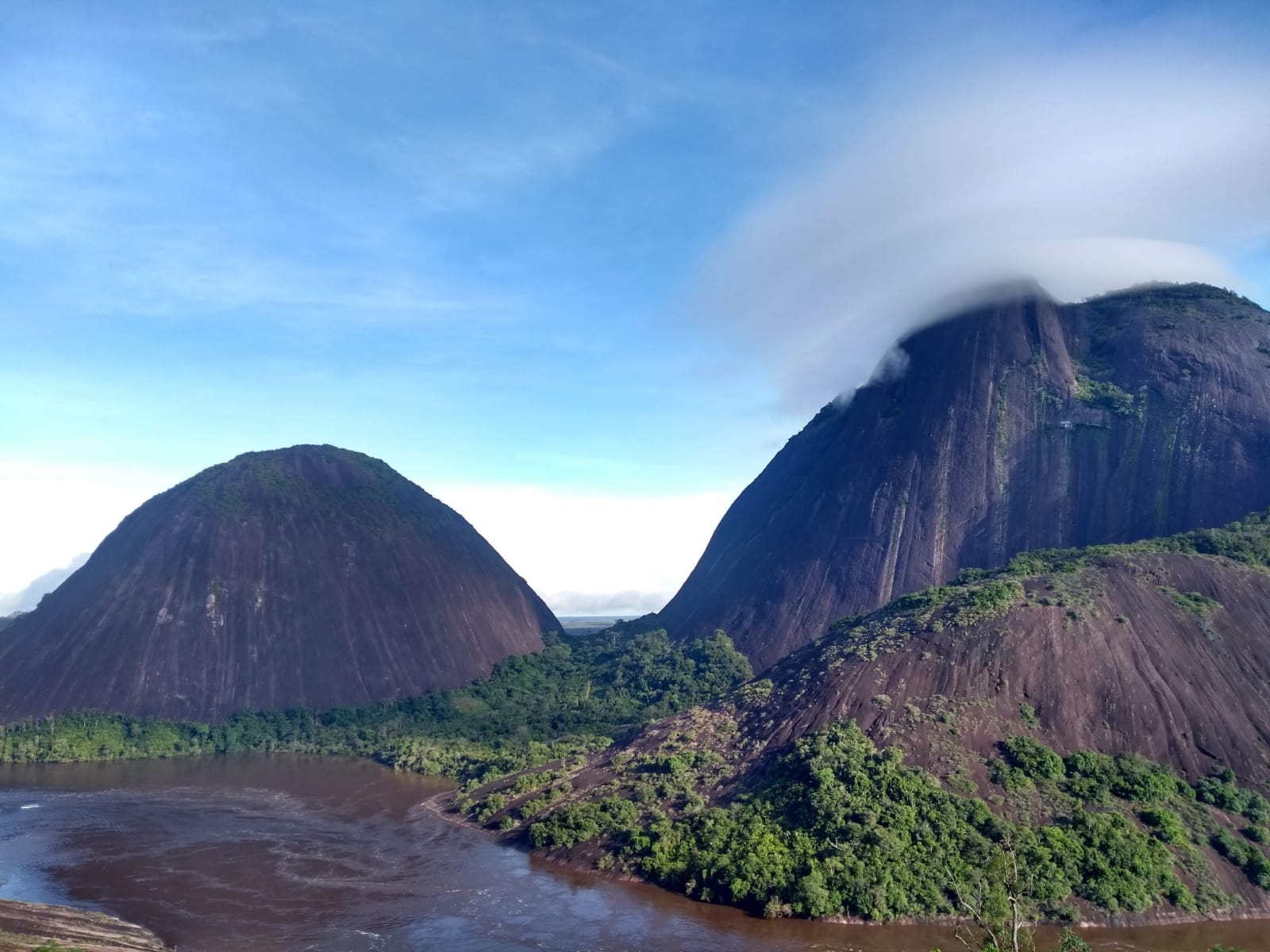
- Mavecure Hill

- Flag Coat of arms

- Guainía shown in red

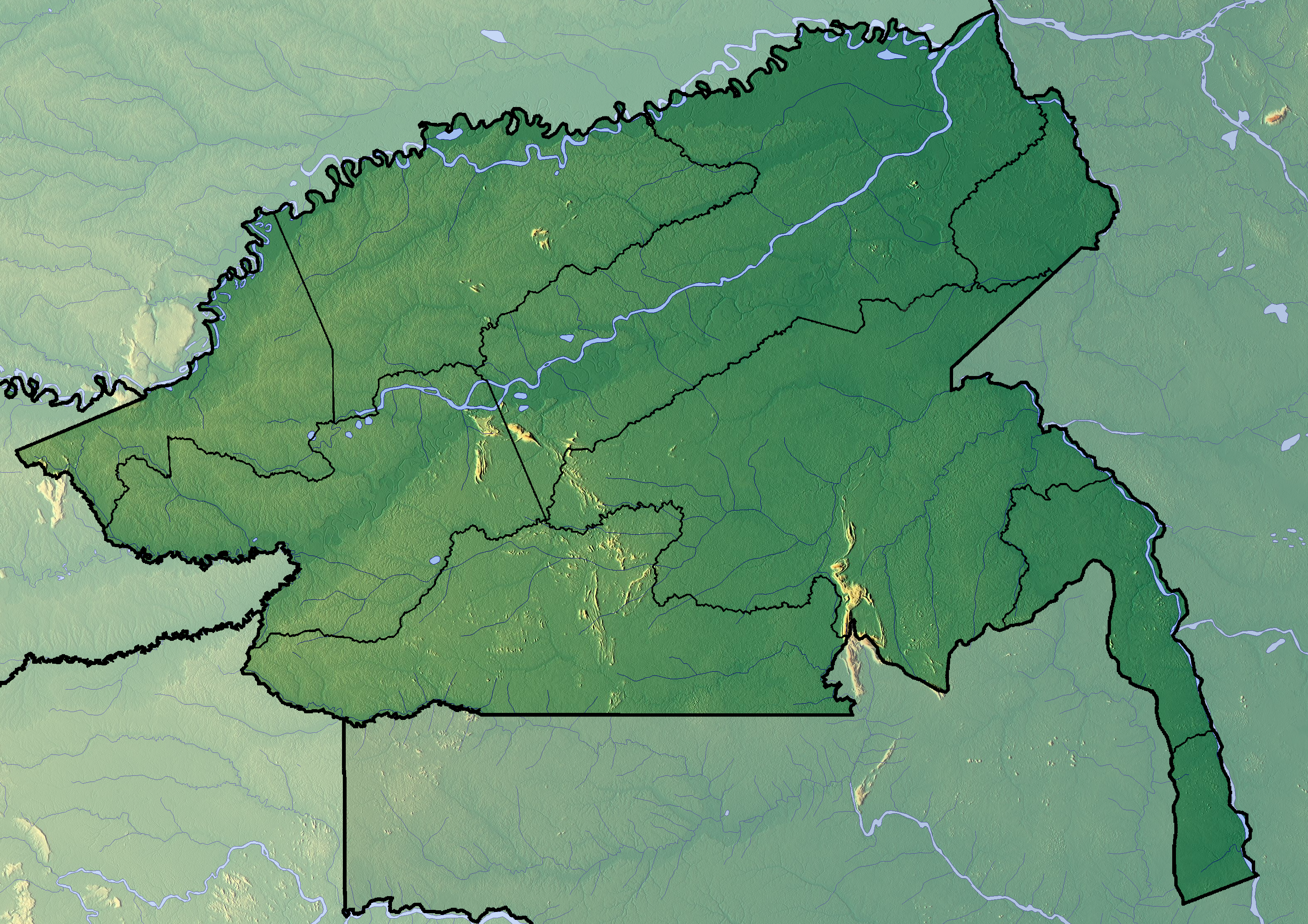
- Topography of the department
- Coordinates: 3°51′55″N 67°55′26″W
- Country: Colombia
- Region: Amazon Region
- Capital: Inírida

Government
  - Governor: Javier Eliecer Zapata Parrado (2016–2019)

Area
  - Total: 72,238 km^{2} (27,891 sq mi)
  - Rank: 5th

Population (2018)
  - Total: 48,114
  - Rank: 33rd
  - Density: 0.66605/km^{2} (1.7251/sq mi)

GDP
  - Total: COP 498 billion (US$ 0.1 billion)
- Time zone: UTC-05
- ISO 3166 code: CO-GUA
- HDI: 0.690 medium · 32nd of 33

Historical population
Year	Pop.	±%
1964	3,602	—
1973	6,637	+84.3%
1985	12,345	+86.0%
1993	28,478	+130.7%
2005	35,230	+23.7%
2018	48,114	+36.6%

Guainía (Spanish pronunciation: [ɡwajˈni.a]; Yuri language: "Land of many waters") is a department of Eastern Colombia. It is in the east of the country, bordering Venezuela and Brazil. Its capital is Inírida. In 1963 Guainía was split off from Vaupés department. The northern part and the Inírida River are included in the Orinoco basin; the rest is part of the Amazon basin. The Guaviare River is the main area of colonization; many colonos come from the Colombian Andean zone, most of them from Boyacá. They are followed by the llaneros, people from the Eastern plains (Llanos). The population is mainly composed of Amerindians, and the largest ethnic groups are the Puinaves (from the makú-puinave family) and the Curripacos (from the Arawak family). There are a total of 24 ethnic groups in the department; many of them speak four Indigenous languages besides Spanish and Portuguese.

== Municipalities ==
There are two municipalities in Guainía: Inírida, its capital, and Barranco Minas. The rest of the territory is subdivided in corregimientos departamentales, a pending figure due to public disorder. This case happens only in Amazonas, Vaupés and Vichada. Barranco Minas is the second biggest population and a municipality since 2019; it is located on the Guaviare River.

The Guainía corregimientos are:

1. Cacahual
2. La Guadalupe
3. Mapiripana
4. Morichal Nuevo
5. Pana Pana
6. Puerto Colombia
7. San Felipe
