= Administrative divisions of Colombia =

Administrative subdivisions of Colombia

Territorial organization of Colombia
- Diagram showing the levels of territorial organization of the country.

First-level divisions
- 32 departments: See list
- 1 Capital District: Bogotá

Second-level divisions
- 1,103 municipalities: See list
- 19 non-municipalized areas: See list

Colombia, officially the Republic of Colombia, is a sovereign country located in the northwestern region of South America. It is constituted as a unitary state, a social and democratic state governed by the rule of law, with a presidential form of government. It is a republic politically organized into departments and the capital district.

Within the framework of administrative decentralization in Colombia, Article 286 of the 1991 Political Constitution recognizes as territorial entities the departments, the districts, the municipalities and the indigenous territories.

== First administrative level ==
=== Departments ===
The departments are one of the two first-level territorial entities in Colombia. The country is administratively and politically divided into 32 departments, which are governed from their respective capitals. According to Article 298 of the 1991 Political Constitution of Colombia, a department is a territorial entity that enjoys autonomy in the administration of sectional matters and in the planning and promotion of economic and social development within its territory, under the terms established by the Constitution and the law.

The departmental administration is headed by the governor, who is elected every four years. Each department has its own departmental assembly, a regional publicly elected body with administrative autonomy and its own budget. The departmental assemblies are made up of no fewer than 11 and no more than 50 deputies, popularly elected for a term of 4 years. The departmental assemblies issue ordinances that are binding within their territorial jurisdiction or department.

Formerly there were the figures of the commissary and the intendancy, which made up the so-called national territories. Their administrative regime was very different from that of the departments, as they were subject to the provisions of the central government; among them were Guainía, Vaupés, Vichada, and others. However, these were raised to the category of department by the 1991 political constitution.

=== Capital District ===
Bogotá, together with the thirty-two departments, forms one of the two first-level territorial entities of the Republic of Colombia. It is the capital of Colombia and of the department of Cundinamarca. It is administered as a capital district, and enjoys autonomy in the management of its interests within the limits of the Constitution and the law. Unlike the other districts of Colombia, it has administrative powers that the law confers on the departments. It is made up of 20 localities.

== Second administrative level ==
=== Municipalities ===
Typology of second administrative level in Colombia.

The municipalities are one of the two second-level territorial entities in Colombia. Colombia has 1,103 municipalities, which, according to Article 311 of the 1991 Political Constitution of Colombia, Law 136 of 2 June 1994 and Law 1551 of 2012, are the fundamental territorial entity of the political-administrative division of the State, with political, fiscal and administrative autonomy within the limits set by the Constitution and the laws of the Republic.

The municipalities of Colombia have a municipal seat, populated centers and a dispersed rural area.

Each municipality has a municipal seat, which is a town that usually bears the same name as the municipality and serves as its capital. There are approximately 39 cases in which the name of the municipality does not match that of its seat (see heteronymous municipalities of Colombia).

=== Districts ===
The districts are one of the two second-level territorial entities in Colombia. They are municipalities that have one or more characteristics that distinguish them from the surrounding municipalities, such as their political, commercial, historical, tourist, cultural, industrial, environmental, port or border importance. Colombia has twelve recognized districts: Bogotá, Barranquilla, Cartagena de Indias, Santa Marta, Buenaventura, Riohacha, Cali, Mompós, Barrancabermeja, Turbo, Tumaco and Medellín.

The aforementioned districts operate in a manner similar to municipalities within their respective departments and fall under their jurisdiction, whereas Bogotá has a special relationship with the department of Cundinamarca, since the latter does not exercise authority over the capital district; thus Bogotá is considered a first-order entity, autonomous and independent of the department. The courts of Bogotá and Cundinamarca have jurisdiction over Bogotá, but the governor and the assembly do not. Districts are divided into localities (although there are exceptions as established by the law governing their adoption).

=== Non-municipalized areas ===
Non-municipalized areas are a special second-level territorial unit in Colombia, found mainly in some departments that were formerly intendancies and commissaries. These areas correspond to certain populated centers that, together with their surroundings, do not belong to any of the existing municipalities, unlike the corregimientos, whose territorial jurisdiction is subordinate to a municipality.

Non-municipalized areas are coordinated by the departmental assembly and administered by an inspector appointed by the governor of the department to which they belong. Although the 1991 political constitution does not contemplate this figure, it is regulated by presidential decree. There are currently 19 non-municipalized areas in the country (including the Island of San Andrés).

== Urban and rural level ==
The urban and rural areas of Colombian municipalities are reflected in the following levels:

=== Municipal seat ===
Each municipality has a municipal seat, which is a town that commonly bears the same name as the municipality and serves as its capital. Its geographic area is delimited by its Land use plan (POT). Within it are located the administrative center of the municipality: the Mayor's Office, the Police Command, the Notary's Office, the Court, and the seat of the Municipal Council. It is common to refer to the municipal seat popularly as a city, municipality, or urban center.

=== Populated centers ===
Populated centers are settlements or population centers with a concentration of at least 20 contiguous, neighboring or attached dwellings, located in the remaining municipal area or in a non-municipalized area. Such an agglomeration has some urban characteristics, such as vehicular and pedestrian roads. In addition, it has certain infrastructure that at times serves the dispersed population (veredas) in its area of influence.

=== Veredas ===
Veredas of the municipality of Envigado.

The dispersed rural area is a geographic delimitation that lies outside the urban perimeter of the municipal seat and the populated centers, within the municipal boundary. It is characterized by the dispersed arrangement of dwellings and agricultural holdings found there.

The municipalities have granted it the category of territorial division, under the name Vereda. Veredas formed from the clustering of the rural population near the vereda roads that crossed the municipal boundaries and served as a means of communication between several municipalities; in some cases these settlements remained with a dispersed population and in others they formed a populated center.

== Indigenous territories ==
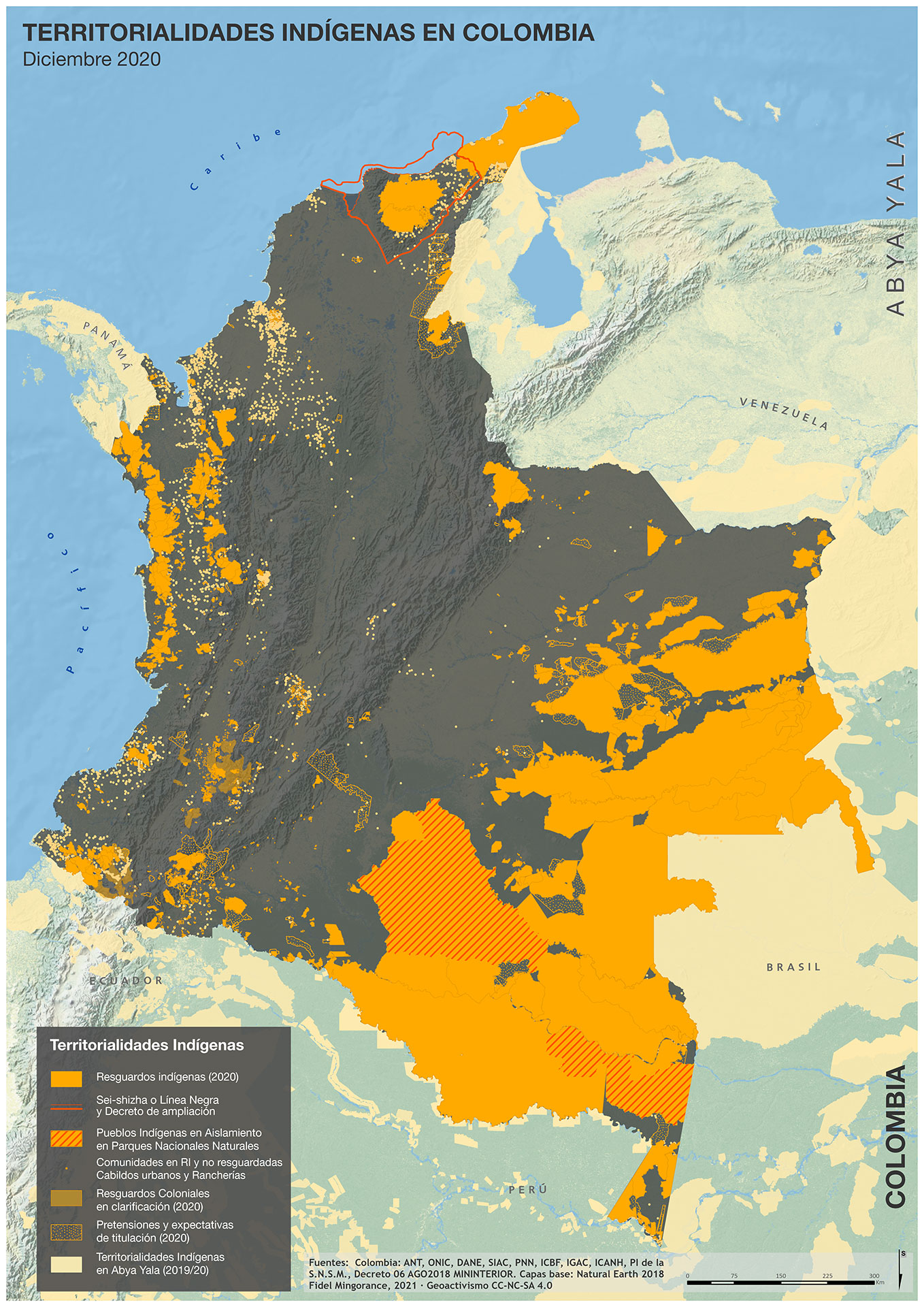
Indigenous territories (or resguardos) within Colombia, shown in gold.

Indigenous territories are, in Colombia, areas under a special regime created by mutual agreement between the government and indigenous communities. In cases where indigenous territories span more than one department or municipality, the local governments administer these territories jointly with the indigenous councils, as established in Articles 329 and 330 of the Constitution of Colombia. Likewise, indigenous territories may come to have the status of a territorial entity when they meet the requirements of the law.

== Local administrative units ==
In order to improve service delivery and ensure citizen participation in the management of local affairs, municipal and district councils may assign administrative functions to areas of their territory under a Local Administrative Board (JAL). Each local administrative unit will constitute an electoral district.

=== Communes ===
Map of the municipal territory of Medellín, showing the division of its municipal seat (communes) and the remaining municipal area (corregimientos).

Communes are administrative units of the municipal seat that group neighborhoods and sectors. They are created by the municipal councils according to the needs of the population and the territory, in order to coordinate services in a given urban area. Each commune is governed by a Local Administrative Board (Junta Administradora Local, JAL).

In municipalities and districts classified as special, first and second category, municipal councils may organize communes with no fewer than 10,000 inhabitants, and in those classified in the third and fourth categories, with no fewer than 5,000 inhabitants.

=== Corregimientos ===
According to the Colombian territorial organization, the municipal councils may endow population centers that are remote from, or not agglomerated with, the municipal seat with administrative functions under the responsibility of a Local Administrative Board (JAL). This local administrative unit is called a corregimiento. The JAL sends a shortlist of three candidates (terna) for the appointment of the corregidor.

Its main function is to serve as an intermediate body of the corresponding rural area with the administration of the municipality to which it belongs. Councils may divide their municipalities into corregimientos, which encompass populated centers and veredas. A corregimiento must have at least two thousand inhabitants residing in the populated center that serves as its seat. The agreement by which the territory of the municipality is divided into corregimientos shall set their name, boundaries and powers, and shall issue the other rules necessary for their organization and operation.

=== Localities ===
Localities of Bogotá, Capital District.

In Colombia, the districts are generally divided into localities, organized according to criteria of geographic, social, cultural and economic homogeneity. However, the legislation provides for exceptions in the adoption of these local administrative units, as is the case in the district of Medellín.

The structure and operation of the localities is regulated by Law 1617 of 2013. Each locality has a Local Administrative Board (JAL), made up of popularly elected councillors (ediles), which exercises political oversight and submits a shortlist of three candidates to appoint the local mayor. The local mayor acts as the authorizing officer for the Local Development Fund (which has its own autonomous assets) and appoints the police inspectors. In Bogotá, the Office of the Municipal Ombudsman (Personería) has delegates in each locality.

== Subregions ==
Map showing the departments divided into subregions.

There is a type of internal subdivision of the departments made up of groupings of neighboring municipalities (and Indigenous territories), called subregions or provinces (the latter term is more historical than legal and is used only in the departments of Boyacá and Cundinamarca). Subregions are defined as geographically proximate areas for the functional planning of the territory, beyond political-administrative boundaries. In general terms, subregionalization is a tool that contributes to several objectives:

Better coordination between levels of government and between administrative sectors; Greater efficiency in planning processes by optimizing investments according to the functional relationships among territories, so that projects achieve a scale larger than the municipal level and have a greater impact; Facilitating dialogue between the different levels of government and citizens.

Subregions are almost nonexistent in the Amazon natural region and the eastern Llanos (the exceptions being the department of Meta).

=== Administrative and Planning Provinces (PAP) ===
Article 286 of the Political Constitution of Colombia allows for the creation of Administrative and Planning Provinces (PAP) as a form of territorial association:

To join one, a popular consultation must be held in the municipalities concerned. The law will establish the basic statute and set the administrative regime of the provinces, which may be organized to carry out the functions delegated to them by national or departmental entities, as well as those assigned to them by law and by the municipalities that make them up. The department and the municipalities will contribute to the provinces the percentage of their current revenues determined by the departmental assembly and the respective municipal councils.

It has only been implemented on a large scale in Santander. One has been established in the Sumapaz of Cundinamarca. Meanwhile, several more are in progress in Antioquia.

== Other defined areas ==
=== Metropolitan areas ===
Metropolitan areas of the country.

A metropolitan area is, according to Article 2 of Law 1625 of 29 April 2013, an administrative entity of public law, formed by a group of two or more municipalities integrated around a core municipality and linked to one another by territorial, environmental, economic, social, demographic, cultural and technological dynamics and interrelationships, which require coordinated administration for the programming and coordination of their sustainable development. They are endowed with legal personality under public law, administrative autonomy and private assets. In Colombia, 8 metropolitan areas have been configured or recognized.

=== Regional Autonomous Corporations ===
Regional Autonomous Corporations.

The Regional Autonomous Corporations (CAR) are autonomous public entities in charge of environmental management and the administration of natural resources in Colombia. They were created as the regional pillar of the National System of Protected Areas (SINA). Their jurisdictions are defined by biophysical and hydrogeographic criteria that group together multiple municipalities and departments, and they enjoy administrative and financial autonomy, without being hierarchically dependent on departmental governorships or mayoralties.

The urban perimeter of municipalities or metropolitan areas whose urban population exceeds one million inhabitants and that of the districts are excluded from their jurisdiction. In these cases, the urban environmental authority is assumed by the metropolitan area or by public environmental establishments, so the work of the CARs focuses mainly on rural areas.

=== Territorial planning and management units ===
The Land use plans (POT) are essential tools in Colombia for sustainable urban management and development. They allow territorial entities to establish a strategic vision of land use and occupation, integrating environmental, economic and social considerations. For this purpose, the so-called Territorial Planning and Management Units are used, which are fundamental for identifying the specific characteristics of each zone or region, and thus for designing effective public policies that promote balanced growth that respects the natural environment and the needs of the community.

The Territorial Planning and Management Units most commonly used to organize zones within a territorial entity are the Spatial Functioning Units and the Rural Planning Units. The best-known example at the national level is the "UPL" (Local Planning Units) of Bogotá.

=== Peasant reserve zones ===
Peasant reserve zones (ZRC) are a protected form of territorial planning in Colombia, established by Law 160 of 1994, which seeks to give peasants lands that belong to the State but are not being used, with the sole purpose of benefiting peasant communities, the peasant economics and ecosystems, with social, economic, cultural and ecological objectives.

The objective of the peasant reserve zones is to create the conditions for the proper consolidation and sustainable development of the peasant economy and of settlers (colonos) in rural areas, in order to overcome the causes of the social conflicts that affect them, and in general to create the conditions for achieving peace and social justice in the respective areas.

=== PDET territories ===
Current PDET territories.

The PDET territories are regions and Colombian municipalities targeted by the government of Colombia as measures to incorporate the implementation of the peace agreements with territorial resources and to coordinate efforts among the different levels of government for regional transformation. They were created by Decree 893 of 2017. To date, 16 subregions of the country have been defined, targeting 170 municipalities. In addition, since the 2022 legislative elections they have their own representation in the Chamber of Representatives of Colombia with 16 seats under the name "Special Transitory Peace Constituencies" (CTREP).

=== Administrative and Planning Regions (RAP) ===
As established by Article 306 of the 1991 Colombian constitution, two or more departments may constitute themselves as administrative and planning regions, with legal personality, autonomy and their own assets. In other words, they are an associative figure that allows departments to ally in order to promote regional projects and common objectives to develop their economies, competitiveness, integration in strategic infrastructure megaprojects, and to foster the rural and social development of the territory. Once the administrative region has achieved its objectives and has operated for five years, a second tier would be created: the Region as a territorial entity (RET), this time of a political-administrative nature.

=== Judicial districts ===
The judicial districts of Colombia are the territorial divisions into which the judicial branch is organized to determine the jurisdiction of its courts and offices. There is no single division: the ordinary jurisdiction, the administrative litigation jurisdiction, the disciplinary jurisdiction and the agrarian and rural jurisdiction each have their own territorial map.

In the ordinary jurisdiction, each district is seated in a Superior Tribunal, which is the functional superior of the courts in its territory; these courts are grouped into judicial circuits made up of municipalities. According to the Geographic Information System of the Judiciary, there are 34 districts and 203 circuits in the ordinary jurisdiction, and 27 districts in the administrative litigation jurisdiction, each with its own administrative tribunal. The disciplinary jurisdiction operates through 25 sectional commissions of judicial discipline, and the agrarian and rural jurisdiction, recently created, currently has one agrarian and rural judicial district.

== See also ==
- Viceroyalty of New Granada
- Subdivisions of Gran Colombia
- Provinces of the Republic of New Granada
- States of Colombia
- National territories (Colombia)
