= Communes of Colombia =

A commune (Spanish: comuna) is an administrative unit in Colombia into which the municipal seat of an intermediate or major city is subdivided, grouping together certain neighbourhoods or sectors. Its purpose is to improve the provision of services and to ensure citizen participation in the management of local public affairs.

Municipal councils may divide their municipality into communes when dealing with the municipal seat, and into corregimientos in the case of the populated centers and veredas under their jurisdiction. Each commune is governed by a Local Administrative Board (Junta Administradora Local, JAL), made up of no fewer than five and no more than nine members, elected by popular vote for a four-year term that must coincide with the term of the Municipal Council.

== Requirements for creation ==
In municipalities classified as special category, first and second category, municipal councils may organize communes with no fewer than 10,000 inhabitants; in those classified as third and fourth category, with no fewer than 5,000 inhabitants.

Where this requirement is not met, in the remaining municipalities, mayors must design citizen participation mechanisms through which residents can take part in solving their problems and needs.

Although Medellín was elevated to the status of a district, it decided to keep its division into communes rather than reorganizing it into localities, leaving open the possibility of creating new communes in the future.

== Examples ==
- Communes of Medellín
- Communes of Soacha

== See also ==
- Corregimientos of Colombia
- Localities of Bogotá
- Law of Large Cities (Spain)
