= Tagachí, Chocó =

Tagachí
- Populated center
- Location in Chocó and Colombia Tagachí (Colombia)
- Coordinates: 6°13′18.4″N 76°43′37.3″W
- Country: Colombia
- Department: Chocó
- Municipality: Quibdó Municipality
- Elevation: 66 ft (20 m)

Population (2005)
  - Total: 635
- Time zone: UTC-5 (Colombia Standard Time)

Tagachí is a populated center of Colombia in Quibdó Municipality, Chocó Department in Colombia.

== Climate ==
Tagachí has an extremely wet tropical rainforest climate (Af).

Climate data for Tagachí
Month	Jan	Feb	Mar	Apr	May	Jun	Jul	Aug	Sep	Oct	Nov	Dec	Year
Mean daily maximum °C (°F)	30.8 (87.4)	30.9 (87.6)	31.3 (88.3)	31.0 (87.8)	30.3 (86.5)	30.3 (86.5)	30.3 (86.5)	30.4 (86.7)	30.0 (86.0)	29.6 (85.3)	29.8 (85.6)	30.3 (86.5)	30.4 (86.7)
Daily mean °C (°F)	26.5 (79.7)	26.7 (80.1)	27.1 (80.8)	26.9 (80.4)	26.5 (79.7)	26.5 (79.7)	26.4 (79.5)	26.5 (79.7)	26.4 (79.5)	26.0 (78.8)	26.0 (78.8)	26.5 (79.7)	26.5 (79.7)
Mean daily minimum °C (°F)	22.3 (72.1)	22.5 (72.5)	22.9 (73.2)	22.9 (73.2)	22.8 (73.0)	22.7 (72.9)	22.6 (72.7)	22.7 (72.9)	22.7 (72.9)	22.4 (72.3)	22.3 (72.1)	22.7 (72.9)	22.6 (72.7)
Average rainfall mm (inches)	463.3 (18.24)	396.8 (15.62)	410.7 (16.17)	613.2 (24.14)	732.9 (28.85)	727.7 (28.65)	747.7 (29.44)	732.4 (28.83)	751.9 (29.60)	704.7 (27.74)	668.4 (26.31)	639.2 (25.17)	7,588.9 (298.76)
Average rainy days	13	12	12	16	18	19	19	19	18	18	18	16	198
