= López Adentro =

Lopez Adentro
- Municipality and Reservation
- Location of the town of Lopez Adentro, Cauca Department of Colombia

- Location in Colombia
- Coordinates: 3°07′0.8″N 76°20′28″W
- Country: Colombia
- Department: Cauca Department

Population (2018)
  - Total: 2,000
- Time zone: UTC-5 (Colombia Standard Time)

López Adentro is an indigenous reservation of Colombia, belonging to the Nasa culture that is located to the north of the department of Cauca, between the municipalities of Caloto and Corinto.

The reservation has heights ranging from 1,050 and 4,100m, corresponding to mountainous landscapes 5 and alluvial piedmont plain. The indigenous community is distributed in several thermal floors ranging from temperate to low paramuno. The temperature oscillates between 12 and 23 degrees Celsius, with an average annual rainfall of 1,673mm.

== Geographical aspects ==
It has a population of more than 2,000 inhabitants. The human settlements are presented in the form of hamlets inside the villages of San Rafael, Chicharronal, El Jagual, El Crucero, La Secreta, Los Alpes, El Danubio, Las Violetas, La Cristalina and El Boquerón.

== Environmental conflict ==
The Nasa indigenous community has been seriously affected by the monoculture of sugar cane, which has generated a considerable number of environmental liabilities and an ecological-distributive conflict, which have modified ancestral agro-ecological customs. Many indigenous people in this region ceased to be farmers in order to lease their lands to the different sugar mills in the region.
