= Bucheli, Nariño =

Bucheli
- Populated center
- Location in Nariño and Colombia Bucheli (Colombia)
- Coordinates: 1°42′14.1″N 78°46′11.0″W
- Country: Colombia
- Department: Nariño
- Municipality: Tumaco municipality
- Elevation: 20 ft (6 m)

Population (2018)
  - Total: 751
- Time zone: UTC-5 (Colombia Standard Time)

Bucheli is a populated center of Colombia in Tumaco Municipality, Nariño Department in Colombia.

== Climate ==
Bucheli has a tropical rainforest climate (Af) with heavy to very heavy rainfall year-round.

Climate data for Bucheli
Month	Jan	Feb	Mar	Apr	May	Jun	Jul	Aug	Sep	Oct	Nov	Dec	Year
Mean daily maximum °C (°F)	28.1 (82.6)	28.6 (83.5)	28.9 (84.0)	29.0 (84.2)	28.7 (83.7)	28.7 (83.7)	28.3 (82.9)	28.1 (82.6)	28.1 (82.6)	28.0 (82.4)	27.9 (82.2)	27.9 (82.2)	28.4 (83.1)
Daily mean °C (°F)	25.5 (77.9)	25.8 (78.4)	26.2 (79.2)	26.2 (79.2)	26.0 (78.8)	25.9 (78.6)	25.7 (78.3)	25.6 (78.1)	25.3 (77.5)	25.4 (77.7)	25.3 (77.5)	25.4 (77.7)	25.7 (78.2)
Mean daily minimum °C (°F)	22.9 (73.2)	23.1 (73.6)	23.5 (74.3)	23.5 (74.3)	23.4 (74.1)	23.1 (73.6)	23.2 (73.8)	23.1 (73.6)	22.6 (72.7)	22.8 (73.0)	22.7 (72.9)	22.9 (73.2)	23.1 (73.5)
Average rainfall mm (inches)	346.7 (13.65)	283.9 (11.18)	326.6 (12.86)	355.6 (14.00)	388.4 (15.29)	217.8 (8.57)	167.3 (6.59)	107.9 (4.25)	130.3 (5.13)	115.9 (4.56)	141.0 (5.55)	240.8 (9.48)	2,822.2 (111.11)
