= Puerto Limón, Putumayo =

Puerto Limón
- Populated center
- Location in Putumayo Department and Colombia Puerto Limón (Colombia)
- Coordinates: 1°1′36.5″N 76°32′29.5″W
- Country: Colombia
- Department: Putumayo Department
- Municipality: Mocoa Municipality
- Elevation: 1,410 ft (430 m)

Population (2005)
  - Total: 1,381
- Time zone: UTC-5 (Colombia Standard Time)

Puerto Limón is a populated center of Colombia in the municipality of Mocoa, in the Putumayo department of Colombia.

== Climate ==
Puerto Limón has a wet tropical rainforest climate (Af) with heavy rainfall year-round.

Climate data for Puerto Limón
Month	Jan	Feb	Mar	Apr	May	Jun	Jul	Aug	Sep	Oct	Nov	Dec	Year
Mean daily maximum °C (°F)	29.6 (85.3)	29.3 (84.7)	29.1 (84.4)	28.7 (83.7)	28.5 (83.3)	28.3 (82.9)	28.6 (83.5)	29.2 (84.6)	29.5 (85.1)	29.5 (85.1)	29.2 (84.6)	29.3 (84.7)	29.1 (84.3)
Daily mean °C (°F)	24.4 (75.9)	24.2 (75.6)	24.2 (75.6)	23.9 (75.0)	23.7 (74.7)	23.5 (74.3)	23.5 (74.3)	23.8 (74.8)	24.2 (75.6)	24.3 (75.7)	24.2 (75.6)	24.3 (75.7)	24.0 (75.2)
Mean daily minimum °C (°F)	19.2 (66.6)	19.2 (66.6)	19.3 (66.7)	19.2 (66.6)	19.0 (66.2)	18.8 (65.8)	18.5 (65.3)	18.5 (65.3)	18.9 (66.0)	19.1 (66.4)	19.3 (66.7)	19.3 (66.7)	19.0 (66.2)
Average rainfall mm (inches)	371.3 (14.62)	350.4 (13.80)	398.9 (15.70)	607.0 (23.90)	592.9 (23.34)	558.0 (21.97)	498.0 (19.61)	365.4 (14.39)	381.0 (15.00)	407.8 (16.06)	412.3 (16.23)	446.3 (17.57)	5,389.3 (212.19)
Average rainy days	18	17	21	22	23	23	22	18	17	19	19	20	239
Source: IDEAM
