= Decentralization in Colombia =

Decentralization in Colombia is established in Article 1 of the 1991 Political Constitution, which states that the Colombian nation, besides being unitary, is also "decentralized, with autonomy of its territorial entities".

Territorial decentralization is understood as the granting of administrative powers or functions to regional or local territorial entities, which carry them out in their own name and under their own responsibility. The autonomy of territorial entities, in turn, refers to the freedom granted to them to exercise the functions assigned to them through decentralization, so that they have a high degree of independence in the administration and management of their interests.

However, according to Article 287, this exercise is always subject to the limits of the Constitution and the laws of the Republic.

== Decentralization and autonomy of territorial entities ==
Being a territorial entity implies enjoying autonomy in the management of its interests, within the limits of the Constitution and the law. Accordingly, territorial entities have the following rights:

- To govern themselves through their own authorities
- To exercise the powers that correspond to them
- To administer resources and levy the taxes necessary to carry out their functions
- To share in national revenues

This autonomy operates on two main levels. The first is administrative, which gives territorial entities the power to manage the affairs within their jurisdiction, such as:

- The organization of public services
- The administration of their assets
- The resolution of all problems that arise in the course of their activities
- The planning and promotion of economic and social development within their territory
- Functions of coordination, complementarity, intermediation and provision of the services determined by the Constitution and the laws, in accordance with Article 298.

The second level is fiscal, which allows them to:

- Set taxes
- Share in national revenues
- Autonomously administer their resources

=== Powers subject to principles ===
The result is a situation in which a certain degree of autonomy is conferred on territorial entities for the management of their own affairs. This autonomy must be understood in administrative and financial terms, and does not mean that local authorities are removed from the control exercised by the central government. In this regard, Article 288 of the Constitution establishes that the powers assigned to the different territorial levels must be exercised in accordance with the principles of coordination, concurrence and subsidiarity, following constitutional and legal guidelines.

==== Principle of coordination ====
The principle of coordination holds that administrative authorities must coordinate their actions to properly fulfill the aims of the State. This coordination must occur both among territorial entities and between them and the Nation.

==== Principle of concurrence ====
The principle of concurrence implies a process of participation between the Nation and the territorial entities, so that the latter take part in the "design and development of programs and projects aimed at guaranteeing general welfare and improving quality of life, since only in this way will it be possible to advance in the effective realization of principles that are also of constitutional rank, such as decentralization and territorial autonomy."

==== Principle of subsidiarity ====
The principle of subsidiarity holds that only when a territorial entity cannot exercise certain functions independently may it appeal to higher levels (the department or the Nation) to assume the exercise of those powers. It is established in Article 288 of the 1991 Political Constitution.

== General Participation System ==
The General Participation System (Spanish: Sistema General de Participaciones, SGP) is the main mechanism for transferring resources from the Nation to territorial entities (departments, municipalities and districts). It finances the powers assigned to territorial entities in priority sectors such as education, health, drinking water and basic sanitation. Its constitutional basis is found in Articles 356 and 357 of the Constitution, and its legal development is contained mainly in Law 715 of 2001 and Law 1176 of 2007.

The SGP is one of the most important expressions of fiscal decentralization in Colombia, as it redistributes national revenue to the territories according to criteria of population, poverty, efficiency and equity. At the same time, it operates as an instrument of administrative decentralization, since it allows territorial entities to exercise the powers that the law has assigned to them. However, the use of these resources is subject to rules and conditions set by the central level, which limits the real degree of autonomy of territorial entities.

=== Distribution of resources ===
Of the total SGP resources, 4% is first set aside for special allocations. The remaining 96%, known as sectoral components, is distributed as follows, in accordance with Article 4 of Law 715 of 2001 (as amended by Article 2 of Law 1176 of 2007):

- 58.5% for education
- 24.5% for health
- 5.4% for drinking water and basic sanitation
- 11.6% for the general-purpose share

==== Special allocations ====
The 4% of the total SGP is allocated to the following special allocations:

- 2.9% to the National Pension Fund of Territorial Entities (Fondo Nacional de Pensiones de las Entidades Territoriales, FONPET)
- 0.52% to indigenous reserves (resguardos)
- 0.5% to school feeding programs
- 0.08% to the riverside municipalities of the Magdalena River

=== Sectoral components ===
The sectoral components finance the powers that the law assigns to territorial entities in the priority sectors:

- Education: Direct administration of the education service falls to certified municipalities and districts. Non-certified municipalities depend on their respective department.
- Health
- Drinking water and basic sanitation

The general-purpose share (11.6%) finances the other sectors for which territorial entities are responsible (culture, sports, housing, agricultural development, among others). Its main beneficiaries are municipalities and districts. Departments, as a general rule, do not receive general-purpose resources (with the exception of the archipelago department of San Andrés, Providencia and Santa Catalina, which has a special regime). Consequently, departments finance a large part of their powers in these sectors with own revenues and with resources from the General Royalties System (Sistema General de Regalías, SGR).

Law 715 of 2001 (as amended by Law 1176 of 2007) not only establishes the distribution of SGP resources but also defines the powers of each level of government, thereby forming one of the pillars of the territorial decentralization model in Colombia.

== Own revenues of territorial entities ==
In addition to the resources they receive through transfers from the General Participation System, territorial entities have the power to generate their own revenue, in exercise of the fiscal autonomy recognized by Article 287 of the Constitution. They do so by collecting taxes (such as the unified property tax and the industry and commerce tax, ICA), fees and surcharges (such as the gasoline surcharge), and contributions (valorization and stamp duties). Together with the SGP and the General Royalties System, these are among the main sources of funding for departments, districts and municipalities.

== Categorization of territorial entities ==
The categorization of territorial entities is the system by which the current first and second administrative levels in Colombia (municipalities, districts and departments) are classified according to criteria such as population, current revenues of free allocation, and fiscal and administrative efficiency. This classification makes it possible to establish differentiated obligations and degrees of administrative autonomy consistent with the real capacities of each territory.

Categorization is regulated mainly by Law 136 of 1994 and Law 617 of 2000. The latter introduces seven categories for districts and municipalities (special, first to sixth) and five for departments (special, first to fourth), in both cases ranging from greatest to least administrative and financial capacity. This tool seeks to ensure a progressive and equitable implementation of public powers, recognizing that not all territories have the same human, institutional or economic resources to perform similar functions.

Categorization complements the law on powers by adjusting the application of these functions to territorial realities, thus contributing to the principle of differentiated decentralization.

Categorization of the departments of Colombia under Law 617 of 2000, in 2022.

Categorization of the municipalities of Colombia under Law 617 of 2000, in 2022.

== Special regime ==
=== Archipelago Department of San Andrés, Providencia and Santa Catalina ===
The Archipelago Department of San Andrés, Providencia and Santa Catalina is one of the most notable cases of asymmetric decentralization in Colombia. The territory has a special regime, distinct from that of the other departments, expressly enshrined in the 1991 Political Constitution (mainly in Articles 309 and 310).

Under Article 310, the archipelago "shall be governed, in addition to the rules provided in the Constitution and the laws for the other departments, by the special rules that the legislator establishes on administrative, immigration, fiscal, foreign trade, exchange, financial and economic development matters."

Its main characteristics include:

- The possibility of limiting the exercise of the rights of movement and residence, in order to protect the cultural identity of the Raizal communities, the environment and natural resources.
- A special customs, exchange and fiscal regime.
- Explicit protection of the Raizal communities.
- Its capital is located in a non-municipalized area: San Andrés Island.
- Its additional classification as a Border Zone and Special Border Development Unit.

This special regime responds to the geographic (insularity), cultural (Raizal presence and creole language) and environmental particularities of the archipelago, and is cited as an example of asymmetric decentralization in Colombia's territorial order.

=== Region as a territorial entity ===
Law 1962 of 2019 sets out the organic rules for strengthening the Administrative and Planning Regions (Regiones Administrativas y de Planificación, RAP) and establishes the conditions and procedure for their conversion into Territorial Entity Regions (Región Entidad Territorial, RET), in implementation of Articles 306 and 307 of the Political Constitution of Colombia.

Among the conditions the law requires for this conversion are that the RAP in question has operated as such for at least five years, and the prior opinion of the Territorial Organization Commission, in line with Article 307 of the Constitution. In addition, the decision taken by the Congress is submitted in each case to a referendum of the citizens of the departments concerned.

The National Planning Department provides support and advice for the formation and operation of the RETs, and regulates the relations between them and the other existing territorial entities. Regional facts are declared by the respective Regional Board of the RETs.

== See also ==
- Administrative divisions of Colombia
- Comptroller General of the Republic
