= El Tigre, Buenaventura =

El Tigre
- Vereda
- Location in Valle del Cauca and Colombia El Tigre (Colombia)
- Coordinates: 3°41′10.8″N 77°4′29.3″W
- Country: Colombia
- Department: Valle del Cauca
- Municipality: Buenaventura municipality
- Elevation: 66 ft (20 m)
- Time zone: UTC-5 (Colombia Standard Time)

El Tigre is a vereda in Buenaventura municipality, Valle del Cauca, Colombia.

== Climate ==
El Tigre has a very wet tropical rainforest climate (Af) with heavy to extremely heavy rainfall year-round. Only the rainfall data is available for this village.

Climate data for El Tigre
Month	Jan	Feb	Mar	Apr	May	Jun	Jul	Aug	Sep	Oct	Nov	Dec	Year
Average rainfall mm (inches)	301.9 (11.89)	266.7 (10.50)	305.6 (12.03)	504.3 (19.85)	730.1 (28.74)	568.0 (22.36)	515.8 (20.31)	557.7 (21.96)	763.2 (30.05)	860.8 (33.89)	743.6 (29.28)	532.9 (20.98)	6,650.6 (261.84)
