= Puerto Merizalde =

- Populated center
- Location in Valle del Cauca and Colombia Puerto Merizalde (Colombia)
- Coordinates: 3°15′16.3″N 77°25′4.9″W
- Country: Colombia
- Department: Valle del Cauca
- Municipality: Buenaventura municipality
- Elevation: 20 ft (6 m)

Population (2005)
  - Total: 1,304
- Time zone: UTC-5 (Colombia Standard Time)

Puerto Merizalde is a populated center of Colombia in Buenaventura Municipality, Valle del Cauca Department in Colombia.

== Climate ==
Puerto Merizalde has an extremely wet tropical rainforest climate (Af).

Climate data for Puerto Merizalde
Month	Jan	Feb	Mar	Apr	May	Jun	Jul	Aug	Sep	Oct	Nov	Dec	Year
Mean daily maximum °C (°F)	29.5 (85.1)	30.1 (86.2)	30.4 (86.7)	30.1 (86.2)	30.0 (86.0)	29.8 (85.6)	30.0 (86.0)	29.8 (85.6)	29.5 (85.1)	28.8 (83.8)	28.9 (84.0)	29.2 (84.6)	29.7 (85.4)
Daily mean °C (°F)	25.8 (78.4)	26.1 (79.0)	26.4 (79.5)	26.2 (79.2)	26.3 (79.3)	25.9 (78.6)	26.0 (78.8)	25.9 (78.6)	25.8 (78.4)	25.5 (77.9)	25.6 (78.1)	25.7 (78.3)	25.9 (78.7)
Mean daily minimum °C (°F)	22.2 (72.0)	22.2 (72.0)	22.4 (72.3)	22.4 (72.3)	22.6 (72.7)	22.1 (71.8)	22.0 (71.6)	22.1 (71.8)	22.1 (71.8)	22.3 (72.1)	22.3 (72.1)	22.2 (72.0)	22.2 (72.0)
Average rainfall mm (inches)	548 (21.6)	492 (19.4)	487 (19.2)	701 (27.6)	836 (32.9)	752 (29.6)	699 (27.5)	763 (30.0)	904 (35.6)	937 (36.9)	810 (31.9)	713 (28.1)	8,642 (340.3)
