= Noamamito =

- Populated center
- Location in Cauca Department and Colombia Noamamito (Colombia)
- Coordinates: 3°4′44.4″N 77°32′11.4756″W
- Country: Colombia
- Department: Cauca Department
- Municipality: López de Micay municipality
- Elevation: 23 ft (7 m)

Population (2005)
  - Total: 2,679
- Time zone: UTC-5 (Colombia Standard Time)

Noamamito is a populated center of Colombia in López de Micay Municipality, Cauca Department in Colombia.

== Climate ==
Noamamito has an extremely wet tropical rainforest climate (Af).

Climate data for Noamamito
Month	Jan	Feb	Mar	Apr	May	Jun	Jul	Aug	Sep	Oct	Nov	Dec	Year
Mean daily maximum °C (°F)	29.2 (84.6)	29.9 (85.8)	30.2 (86.4)	29.9 (85.8)	29.8 (85.6)	29.7 (85.5)	29.8 (85.6)	29.7 (85.5)	29.2 (84.6)	28.5 (83.3)	28.6 (83.5)	28.9 (84.0)	29.5 (85.0)
Daily mean °C (°F)	25.8 (78.4)	26.1 (79.0)	26.4 (79.5)	26.2 (79.2)	26.2 (79.2)	25.9 (78.6)	26.0 (78.8)	26.0 (78.8)	25.7 (78.3)	25.5 (77.9)	25.5 (77.9)	25.5 (77.9)	25.9 (78.6)
Mean daily minimum °C (°F)	22.4 (72.3)	22.3 (72.1)	22.5 (72.5)	22.6 (72.7)	22.7 (72.9)	22.2 (72.0)	22.2 (72.0)	22.3 (72.1)	22.3 (72.1)	22.6 (72.7)	22.5 (72.5)	22.2 (72.0)	22.4 (72.3)
Average rainfall mm (inches)	457 (18.0)	392 (15.4)	413 (16.3)	569 (22.4)	815 (32.1)	634 (25.0)	556 (21.9)	622 (24.5)	818 (32.2)	798 (31.4)	712 (28.0)	698 (27.5)	7,484 (294.7)
