= San Francisco de Naya =

- Populated center
- Location in Valle del Cauca and Colombia San Francisco de Naya (Colombia)
- Coordinates: 3°8′20.58″N 77°17′7.97″W
- Country: Colombia
- Department: Valle del Cauca
- Municipality: Buenaventura municipality
- Elevation: 79 ft (24 m)

Population (2018)
  - Total: 392
- Time zone: UTC-5 (Colombia Standard Time)

San Francisco de Naya is a populated center of Colombia in Buenaventura municipality, Valle del Cauca Department in Colombia.

== Climate ==
San Francisco de Naya has an extremely wet tropical rainforest climate (Af). It is one of the wettest places in the department of Valle del Cauca and one of the wettest in Colombia and in the world.

Climate data for San Francisco de Naya
Month	Jan	Feb	Mar	Apr	May	Jun	Jul	Aug	Sep	Oct	Nov	Dec	Year
Mean daily maximum °C (°F)	29.4 (84.9)	30.0 (86.0)	30.2 (86.4)	29.9 (85.8)	29.8 (85.6)	29.7 (85.5)	29.9 (85.8)	29.8 (85.6)	29.5 (85.1)	28.8 (83.8)	28.7 (83.7)	29.1 (84.4)	29.6 (85.2)
Daily mean °C (°F)	25.9 (78.6)	26.2 (79.2)	26.3 (79.3)	26.2 (79.2)	26.2 (79.2)	26.0 (78.8)	26.0 (78.8)	26.0 (78.8)	25.9 (78.6)	25.6 (78.1)	25.6 (78.1)	25.7 (78.3)	26.0 (78.8)
Mean daily minimum °C (°F)	22.4 (72.3)	22.4 (72.3)	22.5 (72.5)	22.6 (72.7)	22.7 (72.9)	22.3 (72.1)	22.1 (71.8)	22.2 (72.0)	22.3 (72.1)	22.5 (72.5)	22.5 (72.5)	22.3 (72.1)	22.4 (72.3)
Average rainfall mm (inches)	833 (32.8)	731 (28.8)	687 (27.0)	1,013 (39.9)	1,121 (44.1)	987 (38.9)	940 (37.0)	991 (39.0)	1,144 (45.0)	1,271 (50.0)	1,092 (43.0)	1,019 (40.1)	11,829 (465.6)
