= Mataje =

- Populated center
- Location in Nariño and Colombia Mataje (Colombia)
- Coordinates: 1°21′43.8″N 78°42′57.3″W
- Country: Colombia
- Department: Nariño
- Municipality: Tumaco municipality
- Elevation: 115 ft (35 m)

Population (2010)
  - Total: 1,475
- Time zone: UTC-5 (Colombia Standard Time)

Mataje is a populated center of Colombia in Tumaco Municipality, Nariño Department in Colombia at the border with Ecuador.

== Climate ==
Mataje has a wet tropical rainforest climate (Af).

Climate data for Mataje
Month	Jan	Feb	Mar	Apr	May	Jun	Jul	Aug	Sep	Oct	Nov	Dec	Year
Mean daily maximum °C (°F)	29.6 (85.3)	30.0 (86.0)	30.2 (86.4)	30.2 (86.4)	29.8 (85.6)	29.5 (85.1)	29.5 (85.1)	29.2 (84.6)	29.1 (84.4)	29.1 (84.4)	29.0 (84.2)	29.1 (84.4)	29.5 (85.2)
Daily mean °C (°F)	25.7 (78.3)	26.0 (78.8)	26.2 (79.2)	26.2 (79.2)	26.0 (78.8)	25.7 (78.3)	25.6 (78.1)	25.3 (77.5)	25.3 (77.5)	25.4 (77.7)	25.3 (77.5)	25.5 (77.9)	25.7 (78.2)
Mean daily minimum °C (°F)	21.8 (71.2)	22.0 (71.6)	22.3 (72.1)	22.3 (72.1)	22.3 (72.1)	22.0 (71.6)	21.7 (71.1)	21.5 (70.7)	21.6 (70.9)	21.8 (71.2)	21.7 (71.1)	21.9 (71.4)	21.9 (71.4)
Average rainfall mm (inches)	390.2 (15.36)	327.0 (12.87)	331.1 (13.04)	408.4 (16.08)	496.5 (19.55)	303.5 (11.95)	189.8 (7.47)	139.6 (5.50)	172.3 (6.78)	163.9 (6.45)	131.8 (5.19)	264.3 (10.41)	3,318.4 (130.65)
Average rainy days	23	21	20	24	26	24	22	18	20	20	16	21	255
