= Guaviare, Guainía =

Coordinates: 3.922°N 67.860°W

- Populated center
- Interactive map of Guaviare, Guainía
- Country: Colombia
- Department: Guainía Department
- Time zone: UTC-5 (Colombia Standard Time)

Guaviare is a populated center located in the Guainía Department, Republic of Colombia.
