= National Administrative Department of Statistics =

Department of Colombia responsible for the census and related statistics

- Departamento Administrativo Nacional de Estadística
- Logo of DANE

Agency overview
- Formed: 14 October 1953
- Preceding agency: Dirección Nacional de Estadística
- Headquarters: Carrera 59 № 26-70 Bogotá, D.C., Colombia; 04°38′49.28″N 74°05′44.03″W
- Annual budget: COP$371,929,146,839 (2014)
- Agency executive: Beatriz Piedad Urdinola Contreras, Director
- Child agencies: FONDANE; IGAC
- Key document: Decreto 2666 de 1953
- Website: www.dane.gov.co

The National Administrative Department of Statistics (Spanish: Departamento Administrativo Nacional de Estadística), commonly referred to as DANE, is the Colombian Administrative Department responsible for the planning, compilation, analysis and dissemination of the official statistics of Colombia. DANE is responsible for conducting the National Population and Housing census every ten years, among several other studie

DANE offers more than 100 statistical operations on industrial, economic, agricultural, population and quality of life aspects aimed at supporting decision-making in the country.

Since 2022, the director is Beatriz Piedad Urdinola Contreras.

== Adsorbed entities ==
- Rotatory Fund of DANE (FONDANE).
- Geographic Institute Agustín Codazzi (IGAC).

== Divipola ==
The Codification of the Political-Administrative Division of Colombia (Codificación de la División Político-Administrativa de Colombia, Divipola) is a unique numeric identification code for each of the territorial units of Colombia: territorial entities (departments, districts and municipalities), non-municipalized areas (áreas no municipalizadas) and populated centers (centros poblados).

The DANE is responsible for updating it periodically and serves as the reference source on the political-administrative organization of the country. Divipola codes are used as an important standard in the documentation of national institutions.

The code for each populated center consists of 8 digits. Taking the following example as a reference:

Divipola code	Name of territorial entity
11 001	Bogotá

Each group of digits is expressed as follows, using the example below:

Code	Definition	Name
05001001	Department	Antioquia
05001001	Municipality	Medellín
05001001	Populated center	Palmitas

== Previous censuses ==
- 2018 Colombian census

== See also ==
- National Planning Department
- Geographic Institute Agustín Codazzi
