= Non-municipalized areas of Colombia =

Non-municipalized areas
- Category: Second-level administrative division
- Location: Colombia
- Found in: Departments
- Created: 1991
- Number: 19 (as of 2017)
- Government: Departmental; Inspector

Non-municipalized areas (Spanish: áreas no municipalizadas), formerly known as departmental corregimientos (corregimientos departamentales), are a special second-level territorial unit of Colombia, found mainly in the sparsely populated southern departments of Amazonas, Vaupés and Guainía, and on San Andrés Island.

A non-municipalized area consists of one or more populated centers that, together with their surroundings, do not belong to any existing municipality (Decree 2274 of 4 October 1991). This distinguishes them from corregimientos, whose territorial jurisdiction is subordinate to a municipality. This is mainly because, before the 1991 Political Constitution, these populated centers fell under the figure of "intendencial and commissarial corregimientos" (intendencias and comisarías), a special regime that covered the former national territories.

Because they are not municipalities, they have no municipal council. They are coordinated by the Departmental Assembly and administered by an inspector appointed by the governor of the department to which they belong. Non-municipalized areas also once existed in Vichada, but they were incorporated into the municipality of Cumaribo. DANE records a total of 18 in the country.

In Ruling C-100 of 2013, the Constitutional Court of Colombia held that, except where the Constitution expressly provides otherwise, as with indigenous territories or special districts (Constitution, art. 287), every portion of Colombian territory should in principle form part of a municipality.

== List of non-municipalized areas of Colombia ==
Name	Department	Area (km^{2})	Population (2020)
El Encanto	Amazonas	1,443	2,078
La Chorrera	Amazonas	12,517	3,040
La Pedrera	Amazonas	13,945	3,985
La Victoria	Amazonas	1,443	658
Mirití-Paraná	Amazonas	16,864	1,879
Puerto Alegría	Amazonas	8,774	754
Puerto Arica	Amazonas	13,526	1,031
Puerto Santander	Amazonas	14,885	1,828
Tarapacá	Amazonas	9,153	4,047
Cacahual	Guainía	6,457	908
La Guadalupe	Guainía	1,167	300
Morichal Nuevo	Guainía	8,563	945
Pana Pana	Guainía	10,097	2,078
Puerto Colombia	Guainía	15,664	2,006
San Felipe	Guainía	3,063	1,796
Pacoa	Vaupés	14,108	4,314
Papunaua	Vaupés	5,937	754
Yavaraté	Vaupés	3,459	1,097
San Andrés	San Andrés and Providencia	32	55,945

== Municipalization process ==
The process of municipalization of these entities is decided by the departmental assemblies, with the approval of the Presidency of the Republic, and endorsed in a popular referendum. The 1991 Political Constitution did not order the immediate municipalization of all these areas. In this context, the Constitutional Court of Colombia considers that, given the economic, geographic and demographic particularities of these regions, the government could preserve this figure provided that the decision was aimed at progressively adapting these territories to the municipal regime set out in the Constitution, and at creating the conditions for these populated centers to become the seeds of new municipalities.

A successful example of municipalization is Barrancominas in Guainía, which began its legal existence as a municipality on 1 December 2019; the former non-municipalized area of Mapiripana is included in this new territorial entity.

== See also ==
- Departments of Colombia
- Municipalities of Colombia
- Municipalities of Colombia by population
- Corregimientos of Colombia
