= Geographic Institute Agustín Codazzi =

Colombian cartographic institute

Agustín Codazzi Institute of Geography
- Instituto Geográfico Agustín Codazzi

Agency overview
- Formed: 13 August 1935
- Headquarters: Carrera 30 No. 48-51 Bogotá, D.C., Colombia
- Annual budget: COP$144,386,875,000 (est. 2010)
- Agency executive: General Director
- Parent agency: National Administrative Department of Statistics (DANE)
- Website: www.igac.gov.co

The Geographic Institute Agustín Codazzi (Spanish: Instituto Geográfico Agustín Codazzi, IGAC) is the entity of the Government of Colombia responsible for producing the official maps and basic cartography of Colombia, and managing the national cadastral infrastructure and the national soil survey. It is also charged with advancing geographic investigations for the development of the country, and educating and training professionals in the geographic information technologies. IGAC also distributes geographic data in the form of its online portal, SIGOT.

== History ==
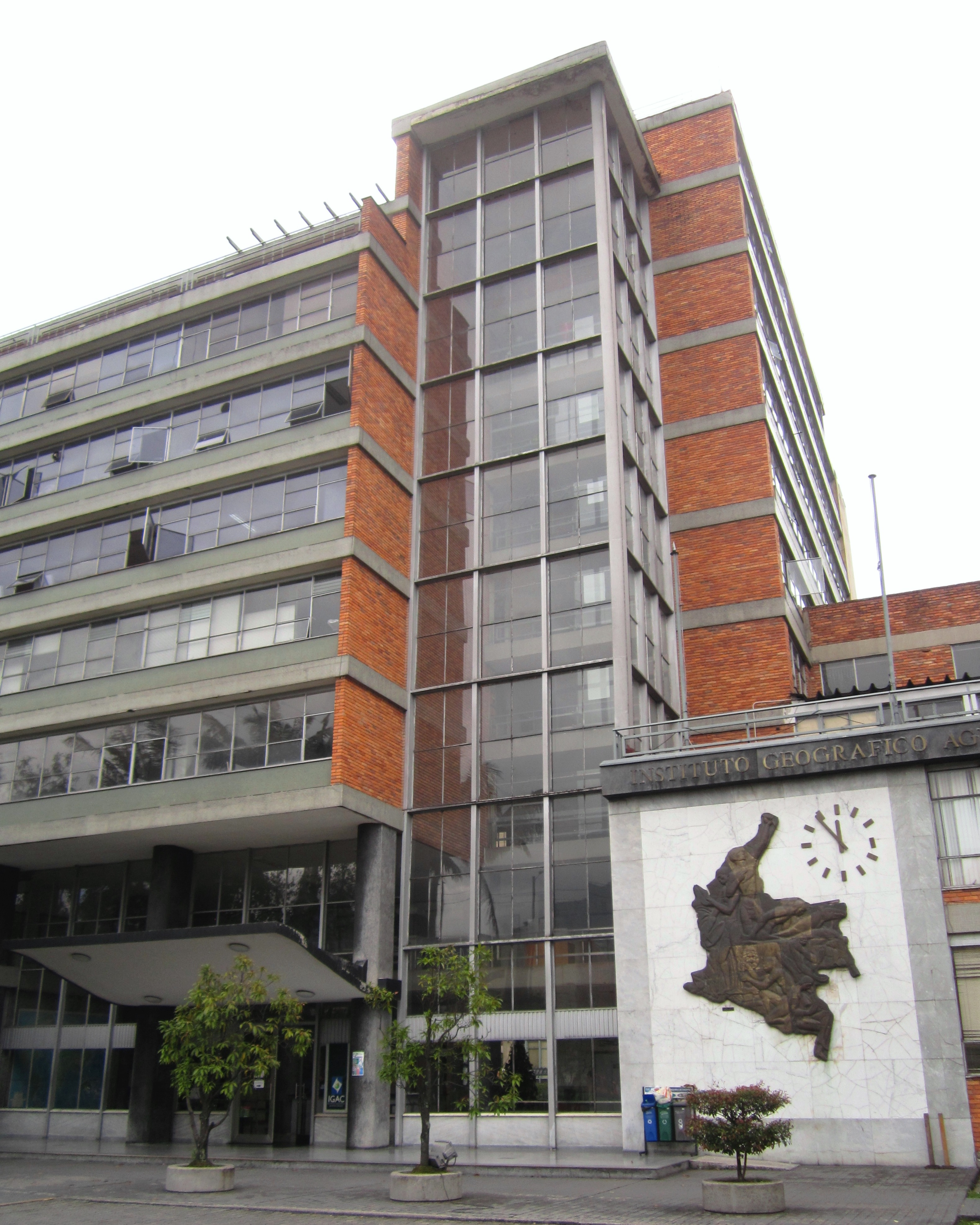
IGAC headquarters in Bogotá

The institute was created following the Colombia–Peru War with the creation of the Military Institute of Geography (Instituto Geográfico Militar) on August 13, 1935, by means of the Decreto 1440 de 1935, and ascribed to the Ministry of War. On January 31, 1940, Decreto 153 de 1940 restructured the institute giving cadastral duties by fusing it with the National Section of Cadastre (Sección Nacional de Catastro), and transferred to the Ministry of Finance and Public Credit, renaming it the Military and Cadastral Geographical Institute (Instituto Geográfico Militar y Catastral). On November 8, 1957, by means of the Decreto Ley 0290 de 1957, the institute was renamed the Geographic Institute Agustín Codazzi in memory of the cartographer Agostino Codazzi and in commemoration of the centenary of his Chorographic Commission, a monumental endeavour that sought to create a geographic land survey of the Neogranadine territory, similar in its goals to the Lewis and Clark Expedition in the United States. The IGAC then became a decentralized agency under the executive branch until 1999 when the National Administrative Department of Statistics (DANE) was tasked with its oversight by Decreto 1174 de 1999.

== See also ==
- List of national mapping agencies
