= District localities of Colombia =

Localities of the Capital District (Bogotá).

In Colombia, districts are generally divided into localities (Spanish: localidades), organized according to criteria of geographic, social, cultural and economic homogeneity. However, the legislation provides for exceptions in the adoption of these local administrative units, as is the case in the district of Medellín. As a general rule, districts that adopt localities replace the other local administrative units, such as comunas and corregimientos, since the localities assume their functions in both urban and rural areas.

The structure and operation of the localities is regulated by Law 1617 of 2013. Each locality has a Local Administrative Board (Junta Administradora Local, JAL), made up of popularly elected councilors (ediles), which exercises political oversight and submits a shortlist of three candidates from which the local mayor is appointed. The local mayor acts as the authorizing officer for the expenditures of the Local Development Fund (which has its own independent assets) and appoints the police inspectors. In Bogotá, the Personería has delegates in each locality.

The authorities of the locality are responsible for managing the matters proper to their territory, while the district authorities are responsible for ensuring the harmonious and integrated development and organization of the territorial entity.

== Administration ==
Each locality shall be subject, under the terms established in this law and the district agreements, to the authority of the mayor, of a Local Administrative Board and of the respective local mayor.

Each locality shall have a local mayor, who shall be appointed by the mayor from a shortlist of three drawn up by the corresponding Local Administrative Board, in a public assembly convened by the district mayor, which must have a quorum of no fewer than eighty percent (80%) of its members. The electoral quotient system shall be used to form the shortlist.

After the localities are created, the district mayor shall, within a period of no more than two (2) months, issue the first call to such an assembly, and in the successive terms of subsequent district administrations, the calls shall be made within the first two (2) months after each district mayor takes office.

== Distribution of powers ==
The district council, on the initiative of the district mayor, shall distribute powers and administrative functions between the district and local authorities, taking into account the principles of concurrence, subsidiarity and complementarity, and the following general criteria:

1. The assignment of powers to local authorities shall seek a greater degree of efficiency in the provision of services.

2. The exercise of functions by local authorities must implement the goals and provisions of the General Development Plan.

3. In the assignment and delegation of powers, the duplication of functions and administrative organizations must be avoided.

4. Responsibilities may not be set without the prior assignment of the resources necessary to carry them out.

== List of district localities ==
Localities by district
District	Localities
Bogotá	Usaquén • Chapinero • Santa Fe • San Cristóbal • Usme • Tunjuelito • Bosa • Kennedy • Fontibón • Engativá • Suba • Barrios Unidos • Teusaquillo • Los Mártires • Antonio Nariño • Puente Aranda • La Candelaria • Rafael Uribe Uribe • Ciudad Bolívar • Sumapaz.
Barranquilla	Riomar • Norte-Centro Histórico • Sur Occidente • Metropolitana • Sur Oriente.
Buenaventura	Isla de Cascajal • El Pailón.
Cartagena de Indias	Historic and Caribbean North • De La Virgen y Turística • Industrial de La Bahía.
Santa Marta	I (Cultural Tayrona - San Pedro Alejandrino) • II (Historic - Rodrigo de Bastidas) • III (Tourist - Pearl of the Caribbean).
Turbo	I - Agricultural and Port.

== See also ==
- Administrative divisions of Colombia
- Localities of Bogotá
