= Local Administrative Board =

Local Administrative Boards
- Juntas Administradoras Locales
- Municipalities with Local Administrative Boards (JAL). Localities Communes and corregimientos Corregimientos only Communes only

Agency overview
- Formed: 1993
- Jurisdiction: Colombia (districts, corregimientos and communes)

A Local Administrative Board (Spanish: Junta Administradora Local), commonly known simply as JAL, is part of the structure of the Colombian State, within the executive branch (with normative functions and functions of political control), at the lowest territorial level: corregimientos, communes and localities. The JALs were established by Law 136 of 1994, which defines them as "administrative corporations of a public nature, popularly elected", which carry out within their area of jurisdiction the functions assigned to them by municipal agreements and delegated rules, subject to the law. Their members are called ediles.

When a Departmental Assembly abolishes a municipality within its jurisdiction and adds that territory to another, the former authorities (councillors) constitute a Local Administrative Board.

== Description ==
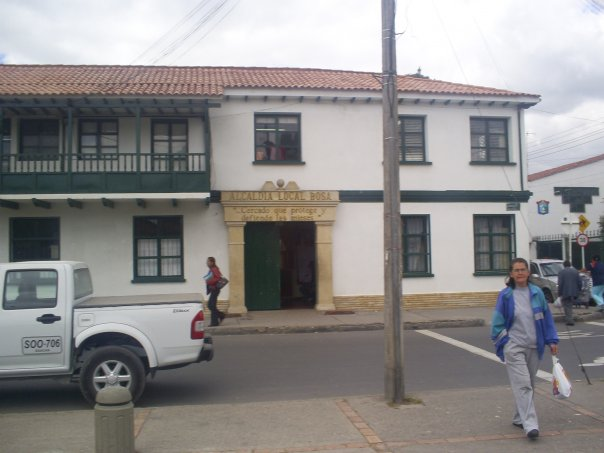
Local Mayor's Office of Bosa, in Bogotá

In Colombia, municipalities are made up of a municipal seat, populated centers and veredas. The municipal seat may in turn (depending on its population size) be divided into communes, while the populated centers and veredas of the municipality may be organized into corregimientos. In special districts, the political-administrative division is called localities. Localities, communes and corregimientos are administered by Local Administrative Boards (JAL), whose members must be elected by popular vote.

In 1991, the Colombian Constitution established the institution in its article 318, numeral 2.

In each commune or corregimiento there is a JAL made up of no fewer than three (3) and no more than nine (9) ediles elected by popular vote for four-year terms, which must coincide with the terms of the mayor and the Municipal Council (Law 1551 of 2012, article 119). The acts of the JALs are called resolutions.

One of the functions of each JAL is to submit shortlists of three candidates to each mayor (municipal or district), so that the mayors may choose the corregidores for the corregimientos and the local mayors for the district localities.

== Functions ==
To provide services and to ensure the participation of citizens in the management of local public affairs, municipal councils may divide their municipalities into communes (in the case of the municipal seat) and corregimientos (groups of populated centers and veredas). In each commune or corregimiento there will be a popularly elected local administrative board, made up of the number of members determined by law, with the following functions:

1. To take part in drawing up municipal plans and programs for economic and social development and for public works.
2. To oversee and control the provision of municipal services in their commune or corregimiento, and the investments made with public resources.
3. To formulate investment proposals to the national, departmental and municipal authorities responsible for drawing up the respective investment plans.
4. To distribute the lump-sum allocations assigned to them by the municipal budget.
5. To exercise the functions delegated to them by the council and other local authorities. Departmental assemblies may organize administrative boards to carry out the functions set out in the act creating them, in the territory that the same act determines.

=== Capital District ===
The institution operates in large and intermediate cities, which correspond to larger and more complex municipalities, such as Bogotá, Medellín, Cali, Cartagena, Barranquilla and some others.

Localities of the Capital District

In the Capital District, Bogotá, the Local Administrative Boards are assigned the following specific functions:

1. To distribute and appropriate the lump-sum allocations assigned to the localities in the annual budget of the Capital District, taking into account the unmet basic needs of their population.
2. To oversee and control the provision of district services in their locality, and the investments made there with public resources.
3. To carry out the functions regarding public services, construction of works and exercise of administrative powers that the law assigns to them and that the national authorities delegate to them.
4. To promote citizen participation and oversight in the management and control of public affairs.
5. To exercise the other functions assigned to them by the Constitution, the law, district agreements and the decrees of the Mayor.

In Bogotá, the JALs co-administer and oversee the localities of the District.

== See also ==
- Municipal council
