= Taxation in Colombia =

Tax system

The tax system of Colombia comprises the levies through which the state finances its expenditure. It is divided into four main categories: taxes, fees (tasas), surcharges (sobretasas) and contributions. National taxes are administered by the National Tax and Customs Directorate (Dirección de Impuestos y Aduanas Nacionales, DIAN); territorial taxes are established and collected by the departments, districts and municipalities.

The main national taxes are income tax, value-added tax (VAT) and the financial transactions tax; among territorial taxes, the industry and commerce tax and the property tax stand out. Many thresholds and amounts are expressed in tax value units (Unidad de Valor Tributario, UVT), a measure that the DIAN updates every year; for 2026 it is set at COP 52,374.

The Colombian system inherited a diverse fiscal structure from the viceregal era, which included levies such as the alcabala, the tithe (diezmo), state monopolies on tobacco and aguardiente, and customs duties. After independence, many of these taxes were gradually abolished; by around 1850 the system had been reduced mainly to three revenue sources: customs, salt works and stamped paper (papel sellado), with a heavy reliance on customs duties for much of the 19th century.

== Formal obligations ==
=== Single Tax Registry (RUT) ===
The Single Tax Registry (Registro Único Tributario, RUT), administered by the DIAN, is the sole mechanism for identifying, locating and classifying the persons subject to the obligations administered and controlled by that agency. It was created by article 19 of Law 863 of 2003, which added article 555-2 to the Tax Statute (Estatuto Tributario), and its regulation is now compiled in Decree 1625 of 2016.

Each registrant is assigned a Tax Identification Number (Número de Identificación Tributaria, NIT), and the registry records their location data, their classification and their tax "responsibilities", identified by numeric codes; for example, code 05 corresponds to income tax under the ordinary regime and code 47 to the SIMPLE regime. Registration must be completed before economic activity begins and can be done electronically on the DIAN portal, at its regional offices or, for those who must register in the commercial registry, through the chambers of commerce. The DIAN may also register and update ex officio those who, according to information it receives from other entities, are required to be registered.

The RUT must be kept up to date, and the taxpayer's classification depends on it (for example, for the purposes of the tax calendar and electronic invoicing). Registration is valid indefinitely and does not need to be renewed; only changes in personal or commercial data must be reported.

=== Electronic invoicing ===
Electronic invoicing is the system under which those required to issue a sales invoice must generate it, transmit it to the DIAN for validation and deliver it to the purchaser in electronic format. Colombia launched its Electronic Invoicing System in 2015. Its legal basis is article 616-1 of the Tax Statute, which empowers the DIAN to regulate the system. It is developed in Decree 1625 of 2016, amended by Decree 358 of 2020 and Decree 442 of 2023, and in DIAN Resolution 000165 of 2023, subsequently amended (including by Resolution 000202 of 2025).

The system comprises, in addition to the sales invoice, other electronic documents:

- the electronic equivalent document (for example, cash-register tickets from point-of-sale systems);
- the support document for acquisitions made from persons not required to issue invoices;
- the electronic payroll support document, which the employer must generate and transmit to support costs and deductions, created by Resolution 000013 of 2021.

Those who fail to issue invoices when required are subject to the penalties of article 652-1 of the Tax Statute, which also apply to non-compliance with electronic payroll. The DIAN also offers a free invoicing solution for taxpayers without their own software.

=== Returns and tax calendar ===
Taxpayers and persons responsible for national taxes administered by the DIAN must file periodic tax returns, which vary by tax: annual for income tax, monthly for withholding tax, and bimonthly or four-monthly for VAT, depending on the person's level of income.

The deadlines for filing and paying are set by the national government by decree. The current calendar rests on Decree 2229 of 2023, which organizes due dates in business days. Each taxpayer's date depends on their classification in the RUT and on the last digit of the NIT (for individual income tax, the last two digits are used). By classification:

- large taxpayers pay income tax in three installments;
- other legal entities pay it in two installments;
- individuals file and pay in a single annual period.

The government may modify deadlines on an extraordinary basis; for example, after the earthquake of 10 August 2026, Decree 1226 of 18 August 2026 granted extended filing and payment deadlines for individual income tax returns to taxpayers whose registered tax domicile is in the affected municipalities. Late or inaccurate filing gives rise to penalties and default interest.

== National taxes ==
National taxes are administered by the National Tax and Customs Directorate (DIAN). They include:

=== Income tax ===
Income tax is a tax on the profits of individuals, companies and other legal entities. It is the backbone of the tax system because it links saving with investment and affects incentives in the labor markets and for entrepreneurship. Within income tax, taxpayers are taxed under the ordinary regime or under the Special Tax Regime; there is also the SIMPLE Tax Regime, which unifies several taxes and is covered in its own section.

- Companies: income tax (impuesto a la renta y complementarios) must be paid by all local and foreign companies operating in Colombia, which are subject to a corporate rate of 35%, in force since taxable year 2022 under article 240 of the Tax Statute, as amended by Law 2277 of 2022. There are additional sector surcharges, such as 3% for hydroelectric power generation and 5% for financial entities with taxable income at or above certain UVT thresholds.
- Individuals: individuals who are tax residents in Colombia are taxed on their net income according to the progressive scale of article 241 of the Tax Statute, expressed in UVT and incorporated by article 34 of Law 2010 of 2019, with marginal rates from 0% to 39%. Tax residence generally depends on having stayed in the country for more than 183 days, continuous or not, within any period of 365 consecutive days (article 10 of the Tax Statute).

Income tax rates for resident individuals (art. 241 ET)
Taxable net income in UVT	Marginal rate	Tax in UVT
0 to 1,090	0%	0
>1,090 to 1,700	19%	(base − 1,090) × 19%
>1,700 to 4,100	28%	(base − 1,700) × 28% + 116
>4,100 to 8,670	33%	(base − 4,100) × 33% + 788
>8,670 to 18,970	35%	(base − 8,670) × 35% + 2,296
>18,970 to 31,000	37%	(base − 18,970) × 37% + 5,901
>31,000	39%	(base − 31,000) × 39% + 10,352

The value of the UVT is set by the DIAN each year; for 2026 it is COP 52,374.

==== Occasional gains tax ====
The occasional gains tax (impuesto de ganancia ocasional) is a complementary tax to income tax that applies to extraordinary income that does not come from the taxpayer's habitual economic activity, such as lotteries, raffles and bets; inheritances, bequests and gifts; and profit on the sale of fixed assets held for two years or more.

For lotteries, raffles, bets and similar, the rate is 20% of the gross value of the prize, applied through withholding at source by the operator or administrator of the game before the prize is delivered to the winner. For other occasional gains (inheritances, gifts, sale of fixed assets), the general rate is 15%.

The amount withheld is an advance payment of the final tax, which the taxpayer must report and include in the annual income tax return.

==== Special Tax Regime ====
The Special Tax Regime (Régimen Tributario Especial, RTE) is the income tax treatment applicable to certain non-profit entities and to other entities listed in article 19 of the Tax Statute, such as corporations, foundations, associations and entities of the cooperative sector. Unlike the SIMPLE regime, it does not unify other taxes: it consists of a special rate and special rules within income tax and complementary taxes.

To belong to the regime, an entity must be legally constituted, have a corporate purpose linked to one or more of the meritorious activities of article 359 of the Tax Statute, and apply to the DIAN for qualification under article 356-2, a procedure introduced by Law 1819 of 2016 and amended by Law 2277 of 2022.

As a general rule, the net benefit or surplus is taxed at a single rate of 20% (article 356). That surplus may be exempt when it is allocated to meritorious activities within the periods and conditions of articles 357 and 358. Entities must update their registration with the DIAN every year, within the first six months; if they fail to do so or do not meet the requirements, they are excluded (article 364-3) and fall under the ordinary regime, with the general rate of 35% on their net income.

=== Wealth tax ===
The wealth tax (impuesto al patrimonio) applies to the holding of net wealth above a threshold. Before 2023 it existed in temporary versions, including the extraordinary tax of 2020 and 2021. Law 2277 of 2022 (articles 35 to 41) re-established it on a permanent basis from 2023, through articles 292-3 to 297-3 of the Tax Statute.

Taxpayers are resident individuals and undivided estates, whether they pay income tax or are in the SIMPLE regime, and certain foreign companies and entities. The tax arises from holding, on 1 January of each year, net wealth equal to or greater than 72,000 UVT (COP 3,770.9 million in 2026). The rate is marginal and progressive (article 296-3): 0.5% between 72,000 and 122,000 UVT, 1% between 122,000 and 239,000 UVT, and 1.5% above 239,000 UVT; this last bracket applies only between 2023 and 2026.

In 2026, an economic-emergency decree that lowered the threshold to 40,000 UVT (Decree 1474 of 2025) was declared unconstitutional by the Constitutional Court (Ruling C-079 of 2026), so the 72,000 UVT threshold remained in force. In addition, Legislative Decree 173 of 2026, amended by Legislative Decree 240 of 2026, created for that year only a transitory tax of 0.5% on legal entities with net wealth equal to or greater than 200,000 UVT on 1 March 2026; the Court provisionally suspended part of its collection while it reviewed its constitutionality.

=== Financial Transactions Tax (GMF) ===
It was created under the government of then-president Andrés Pastrana as an emergency measure to address a serious financial crisis affecting the country's banking and cooperative sectors. The rate was initially 2 per thousand (two pesos for every thousand pesos moved), and it was conceived as a temporary measure, valid initially until the end of 1999. However, because of its ease of collection and the need to keep addressing various economic crises, the tax has remained in place and its rate was increased over time to the current 4 per thousand.

The Financial Transactions Tax (Gravamen a los Movimientos Financieros, GMF), known as the cuatro por mil ("four per thousand"), is a financial transaction tax of 0.4% on financial transactions, including cash withdrawals from automated teller machines, promissory notes, bank transfers, internet banking, bank drafts and cashier's checks, funds in term deposits, overdrafts, installment loans, securities underwriting obligations and other off-balance-sheet risks, safe-deposit box services for documents and other items, foreign exchange, or investment funds.

- Cash withdrawals, by check, by checkbook, with a debit card, at an ATM, withdrawals or payments at payment points, debit notes; issuance of cashier's checks. The four per thousand is also charged in the following cases:
- Transfer of funds under any title.
- Assignment of resources under any title.
- Transfer or assignment of resources between different co-owners of collective portfolios.
- Withdrawal of resources by the beneficiary or settlor from collective portfolios.
- Payments or transfers to third parties through debit notes handled through accounting accounts or accounts other than checking, savings or deposit accounts.
- Accounting movements that constitute payment of obligations or the transfer of goods, resources or rights under any title.
- Debits on amounts credited as positive balances on credit cards.
- The withdrawal of a check and its payment from savings accounts.
- The issuance of cashier's checks charged to a checking or savings account of the user.

Exemptions

Savings accounts with monthly withdrawals not exceeding 350 UVT are exempt from the four per thousand; amounts above that value in the month are taxed. Since 13 December 2024, under Law 2277 of 2022, the 350 UVT limit applies to the combined monthly movements across all of a person's accounts, without the need to designate a single account as exempt.

=== Value-added tax (VAT) ===
Value-added tax (VAT; impuesto sobre las ventas, IVA) is the main indirect tax. The general rate is 19% (article 468 of the Tax Statute), and other treatments exist:

- Reduced rate of 5%, for the goods and services listed in articles 468-1 and 468-3.
- Exempt goods and services (article 477 et seq.): taxed at a 0% rate. Those who produce or sell them can recover the VAT paid on their costs and request a refund.
- Excluded goods and services (articles 424 and 476): they do not give rise to the tax and, unlike exempt supplies, their producers cannot recover the VAT paid on their inputs. Excluded items include, for example, certain human health, education and public passenger transport services.

VAT-responsible persons are classified according to their level of annual gross income, expressed in UVT; individual merchants or artisans whose income does not exceed 3,500 UVT and who meet other legal requirements are not responsible for the tax. Bills are pending in Congress that propose modifying the lists of excluded and reduced-rate goods; they are not part of the current regime.

=== National consumption tax (INC) ===
The National Consumption Tax (Impuesto Nacional al Consumo, INC), known as Impoconsumo, is an indirect, single-stage tax—it arises only once in the marketing chain and does not generate creditable taxes as VAT does—regulated in articles 512-1 to 512-13 of the Tax Statute and created by Law 1607 of 2012. In practice it is paid by the final consumer, but it is collected and declared to the DIAN by the person responsible for the service or sale.

It applies, among other things, to: mobile telephony, internet and mobile browsing services (4% rate); the sale of food and beverages in restaurants, cafeterias and bars (8% rate); and the sale of certain cars, high-displacement motorcycles, yachts and private aircraft (8% or 16% rates depending on the item). It does not apply to restaurant services provided under a franchise (which pay VAT instead), nor to taxis and public transport.

Individuals engaged in restaurants and bars with annual gross income below 3,500 UVT and a single establishment are not responsible for the tax. The tax is declared and paid every two months.

=== Healthy taxes ===
A category introduced into the Colombian fiscal system by Law 2277 of 2022, that groups two complementary taxes added to Title X of Book III of the Tax Statute (article 54 of the Law): the tax on ultra-processed sugary beverages and the tax on ultra-processed edible products. Both took effect on 1 November 2023.

Both tax foods and beverages with the stated aim of encouraging healthier consumption behavior, as part of public health strategies. Their design and their economic and health effects are the subject of debate.

==== Tax on ultra-processed sugary beverages (IBUA) ====
It applies to the production, sale or import of ultra-processed sugary beverages, as well as the concentrates, powders and syrups from which they are obtained after mixing or dilution. The rate is progressive according to the added sugar content per 100 milliliters of beverage; products below the minimum threshold in force do not give rise to the tax, and the DIAN adjusts the amounts annually.

==== Tax on ultra-processed edible products (ICUI) ====
It applies to industrially ultra-processed edible products that exceed certain thresholds of added sugars, sodium or saturated fats established in their nutrition table. As with the IBUA, products that do not exceed those thresholds do not give rise to the tax, and the rates and reference values are adjusted annually. Producers and importers of such goods are the responsible parties.

=== Stamp tax ===
The stamp tax (impuesto de timbre) is a tax on the issuance of an official document (or on the validity of private documents), such as a contract or a contractual amendment.

Since Law 1111 of 2006, the general rate of the stamp tax for most documents and contracts has been reduced to 0%, remaining in force only for certain acts and documents expressly listed by law, such as those related to passports, licenses to carry firearms, licenses to trade in ammunition and explosives, concessions for the exploitation of natural resources, and the recognition of legal entities, among others. The rates for these acts are adjusted periodically according to the UVT.

=== National gasoline and ACPM tax ===
It was created by article 167 of Law 1607 of 2012, in order to replace the global tax on gasoline and ACPM diesel (Law 223 of 1995) and the VAT on fuels. It came into force on 1 January 2013.

The tax arises on the sale, withdrawal, import for own consumption or import for sale of gasoline and ACPM. The party responsible for the tax is the producer or importer of the taxed goods.

The rate is set per gallon and adjusted every 1 February on the basis of the previous year's inflation, by DIAN resolution. Since 1 February 2026 (DIAN Resolution 000003 of 2026), the rate is COP 801.27 per gallon of regular gasoline, COP 1,520.78 per gallon of premium gasoline and COP 766.93 per gallon of ACPM.

Domestically produced fuel alcohol and biofuel intended to be blended with gasoline or ACPM are not subject to this tax.

=== National carbon tax ===
It was created by articles 221 to 223 of Law 1819 of 2016, subsequently amended by articles 47 to 49 of Law 2277 of 2022. It taxes the carbon content of all fossil fuels, including petroleum derivatives and all types of fossil gas, used for energy purposes.

The rate is set per tonne of CO_{2} equivalent and varies by type of fuel; it is adjusted every 1 February on the basis of the previous year's CPI, until it reaches a cap equivalent to 3 UVT per tonne of CO_{2}eq. With the 2026 adjustment (CPI of 5.10% plus one percentage point, for a total of 6.10%), the rate is COP 29,070.49 per tonne of CO_{2}eq, which translates, for example, into COP 210 per gallon of gasoline, COP 237.34 per gallon of ACPM and COP 74,044.65 per tonne of coal; it has not yet reached the 3 UVT threshold (COP 157,122).

It is administered and collected by the DIAN, together with the National Gasoline and ACPM Tax, through the same annual rate-adjustment resolutions.

== National fees and surcharges ==
Fees (tasas) are paid specifically for a service provided by the state or for the use of a public asset; surcharges (sobretasas) are additional charges on another tax or on a specific good or service. These apply uniformly throughout the country, and their collection or regulation is the responsibility of central government bodies (such as the DIAN or ministries), or of regional bodies with environmental jurisdiction (the CARs).

National-level fees and surcharges in Colombia
Levy	Category	Scope or body
Airport fees	Fee	Civil Aeronautics Authority / airline tickets
Notary and registry fees	Fee	Superintendency of Notaries and Registry
Document issuance fees	Fee	Official documents (e.g., passports)
Tolls on the national road network	Fee	INVÍAS / road concessions
Income tax surcharges	Surcharge	Specific sectors (financial, extractive, energy)
Retributive fee and water-use fee	Fee	Regional Autonomous Corporations

== Territorial taxes ==
This group of taxes includes the following, ordered from highest to lowest approximate revenue:

Item	Description	Level
Industry and Commerce Tax (ICA)	Tax on the conduct of any industrial, commercial or service activity. It is historically the main own tax revenue source of municipalities. Taxpayers in the SIMPLE regime pay it on a consolidated basis with their unified tax.	Municipal
Property tax	Annual tax on the ownership, usufruct or possession of real estate located in Colombia. It is the second most important municipal tax revenue, representing about one third of local tax revenue.	Municipal
Motor vehicle tax	Annual tax on the ownership or possession of taxable motor vehicles.	Departmental
Consumption tax on beer, siphons and refajos	Tax on the production and import of beer and derivatives. It is one of the highest-yielding departmental revenues because of the high consumption of the product.	Departmental
Consumption tax on liquors, wines, aperitifs and similar	Tax on domestic and foreign alcoholic beverages.	Departmental
Consumption tax on cigarettes and tobacco	Tax on the sale and consumption of tobacco products.	Departmental
Registration tax	Tax on the registration of acts, contracts or documents that must be recorded with the Chamber of Commerce or the Public Instruments Registry.	Departmental
Signs and billboards tax	Tax complementary to the ICA, charged for the placement of signs, billboards and boards in public space.	Municipal
Public lighting tax	Tax on the public lighting service provided by the municipality; it is usually collected through the electricity bill or as a surcharge on the property tax.	Municipal
Tax on lottery winners	Tax on prizes won in games of chance.	Departmental
Tax on out-of-department lotteries	Tax on the sale of lotteries originating in other departments.	Departmental
Slaughter of large livestock	Tax paid for the slaughter of large livestock (cattle and buffalo) in authorized slaughterhouses.	Departmental
Slaughter of small livestock	Tax paid for the slaughter of small livestock (pigs, sheep, goats, among others) in authorized slaughterhouses.	Municipal
Circulation and traffic tax (rodamiento)	Residual tax on public service vehicles in municipalities that established it before Law 488 of 1998 and have not yet repealed it (e.g., Bogotá, Medellín, Manizales). It is administered exclusively by municipalities; departments have no authority over this tax.	Municipal

=== Industry and Commerce Tax (ICA) ===
This is the tax on the activities of industrialists, merchants and service providers, whether individuals or legal entities, who carry out an activity subject to the tax. It is collected and administered by the municipalities or districts where the activity takes place. Rates typically range from 0.2% to 1% of income. Taxpayers in the SIMPLE regime pay it on a consolidated basis with their unified tax.

=== Property tax ===
This is the property tax levied annually on the ownership, usufruct or possession of real estate located in Colombia. It is collected and administered by the municipalities or districts where the property is located. The rate generally ranges from 0.5% to 1.2% of the property's cadastral value (avalúo catastral).

=== Motor vehicle tax ===
The tax on vehicle ownership has as its tax base the commercial value of the vehicle, determined annually by the Ministry of Transport. The tax is paid to the departments or to the Capital District, which administer and control payment. Taxable vehicles include new and used ones, excluding, among others, public passenger and cargo transport vehicles, which have a reduced rate.

The tax is calculated by applying a progressive rate (1.5%, 2.5% or 3.5%) according to the vehicle's commercial value, within three ranges that the Ministry of Finance and Public Credit readjusts annually by decree, based on the inflation target projected by the Bank of the Republic.

=== Signs and billboards tax ===
The signs and billboards tax (impuesto de avisos y tableros) is a tax complementary to the Industry and Commerce Tax (ICA), whose taxable event is the placement of signs, billboards and boards in public space or visible from it. Although it is assessed and collected together with the ICA, taking its total amount as the tax base, the Council of State has clarified that it retains its nature as a separate, autonomous tax. The rate is 15% of the amount assessed as ICA.

=== Public lighting tax ===
This is the levy that finances the provision, improvement, modernization and expansion of the public lighting service. Although in practice and in some municipal agreements it is called a "fee" (tasa), the Council of State has clarified that its legal nature is that of a tax, since it does not require a direct, individualizable consideration. Its collection is usually delegated to electricity retailers, which transfer the funds to the municipality or to the authorized operator of the service.

== Territorial fees and surcharges ==
Fees are paid specifically for a service provided by the state or for the use of a public asset; surcharges are additional charges on another tax or on a specific good or service. These depend on the ordinances of the Departmental Assemblies or the agreements of the Municipal Councils in each region.

Local-level (municipal and departmental) fees and surcharges
Levy	Category	Scope / level
Gasoline surcharge	Surcharge	Municipal and departmental
Tolls on departmental or municipal roads	Fee	Departmental and municipal
Traffic rights (traffic fee)	Fee	Municipal (traffic offices and agencies)
Traffic-signal rights (semaforización)	Fee	Municipal (only in some municipalities). Its validity is under review by the Constitutional Court.
Fire-department surcharge	Surcharge	Municipal (on property tax or ICA)
Environmental surcharge	Surcharge	Municipal (on property tax)
Fee for use of public space	Fee	Municipal
Fee for on-street parking	Fee	Municipal

Traffic rights pay for the services of the traffic agencies and are charged to owners of vehicles registered in the municipality. Traffic-signal rights are a separate charge: a fixed fee on registered vehicles that exists only in some municipalities (for example, it is charged in Envigado, Itagüí and Rionegro, but not in Medellín). Its nature as a fee has been questioned: the Council of State has stated that municipal councils have no power to create it, because the traffic-signal service is part of public lighting.

== SIMPLE Tax Regime ==
The SIMPLE Tax Regime (Régimen Simple de Tributación, SIMPLE) is an optional model of integral tax determination, created by Law 2010 of 2019 and incorporated into the Tax Statute (articles 903 et seq.). It is not only an income tax regime: it replaces the ordinary return with an annual return with bimonthly advance payments and unifies several taxes into a single obligation, including income tax, the national consumption tax (where applicable) and a consolidated industry and commerce tax, which is distributed among municipalities according to the taxpayer's activity.

Individuals and legal entities that are tax residents in Colombia may opt into the regime if, among other requirements, they obtained gross income, ordinary and extraordinary, below 100,000 UVT in the previous taxable year (about COP 5,237 million for 2026); the limit was raised from 80,000 to 100,000 UVT by Decree 1847 of 2021, and Constitutional Court Ruling C-540 of 2023 later applied the same cap to all groups of activities. Excluded, among others, are those who do not meet the requirements of article 905 of the Tax Statute and the persons listed in article 906, such as foreign legal entities and individuals without residence in Colombia.

The rate depends on the economic activity, grouped into categories, and on the level of annual gross income expressed in UVT (article 908 of the Tax Statute); it is applied to total gross income and not to profit. Individuals whose gross income does not exceed 3,500 UVT need not file the bimonthly advance payments and comply only with the annual return (article 910, paragraph 3). Registration is made with the DIAN and is recorded in the RUT as responsibility 47.

== Advance collection mechanisms ==
These mechanisms do not create a new tax, but operate on existing taxes (income tax, VAT, ICA, stamp tax, among others). The amount collected is credited against the final tax at the time of filing, and is usually withheld by a third party (a withholding agent), although in some cases the taxpayer acts as their own agent (self-withholding). For those not required to file a return, this amount may constitute final payment of the tax.

In Colombia, the most representative mechanism in this category, withholding at source, was created by Decree 1651 of 1961 and is developed in the Tax Statute (Decree 624 of 1989).

=== Withholding at source ===
The generic name given in Colombia to the advance collection mechanism, with different forms depending on the tax on which it operates:

==== Income tax withholding ====
This is the most common and oldest form. It consists of the deduction that a withholding agent makes on certain payments (salaries, fees, rents, purchases, among others) as an advance payment of the income tax that the payee must settle in their annual return.

==== VAT withholding (ReteIVA) ====
A mechanism by which certain withholding agents deduct a percentage of the VAT arising on a transaction and transfer it directly to the DIAN on account of the tax that the seller or service provider must declare.

==== Industry and Commerce Tax withholding (ReteICA) ====
The municipal version of the mechanism, applied as an advance payment of the Industry and Commerce Tax (ICA). Unlike the others, it is not governed by a single national rule; instead, each municipality or district sets its own percentages and subjects by municipal agreement.

==== Stamp tax withholding ====
Applicable to the few acts and documents that continue to give rise to this levy after the general reduction of the stamp tax rate to 0% since Law 1111 of 2006.

=== Withholding agents and self-withholders ===
==== Withholding agents ====
Withholding agents are the persons and entities that, because of their functions or the volume of their operations, must withhold tax at source at the time of payment or crediting to an account and transfer the amount withheld to the DIAN. Article 368 of the Tax Statute lists who has that status, including public entities, legal entities and de facto companies. Individual merchants are also withholding agents when they exceed certain income or wealth thresholds of the previous year (article 368-2). An agent who fails to withhold is liable for the amounts that should have been withheld (article 370). Withholdings made are declared monthly.

==== Self-withholders ====
Self-withholders apply withholding to their own income. There are two forms:

- taxpayers designated as self-withholders by the DIAN under paragraph 1 of article 368 of the Tax Statute;
- the special income tax self-withholding, created by paragraph 2 of article 365 (Law 1819 of 2016) and regulated by Decree 2201 of 2016, now compiled in articles 1.2.6.6 et seq. of Decree 1625 of 2016. In practice it replaced the self-withholding of the CREE tax, which was repealed. It applies to companies and similar entities that are ordinary-regime taxpayers and are exempt from payroll contributions under article 114-1, with rates that depend on their economic activity; non-profit entities do not apply it.

Self-withholding does not prevent the self-withholder from continuing to be subject to withholding by other agents in the cases established by regulation.

=== Income tax advance payment ===
A related mechanism, although of a different nature: in the same annual income tax return, the taxpayer calculates and pays an additional percentage as an advance payment of the tax for the following taxable year, which is later credited against the tax assessed in that future return.

== Contributions ==
Contributions (contribuciones) are compulsory payments that the state collects when there is a benefit (generally an increase in the value of a property or a specific consideration) or to finance particular sectors.

=== National ===
- Social security: although in practice they are perceived as a tax, technically they are parafiscal contributions, because they are allocated to a specific fund that directly benefits those who contribute.
- Regulators: when a company pays a contribution to a Superintendency (such as the Superintendency of Public Services), it finances the oversight and control that the state exercises over its sector.
- Trade associations: these are contributions that finance private or mixed entities that support a specific economic sector (for example, the National Livestock Fund).

=== Territorial ===
- Valorization (valorización): this is the classic example of a contribution, since the payment is directly tied to the increase in value of properties benefited by a public works project.
- Stamps (estampillas): these are contributions of territorial origin that arise from the signing of contracts with regional public entities.
