= Indigenous territory (Colombia) =

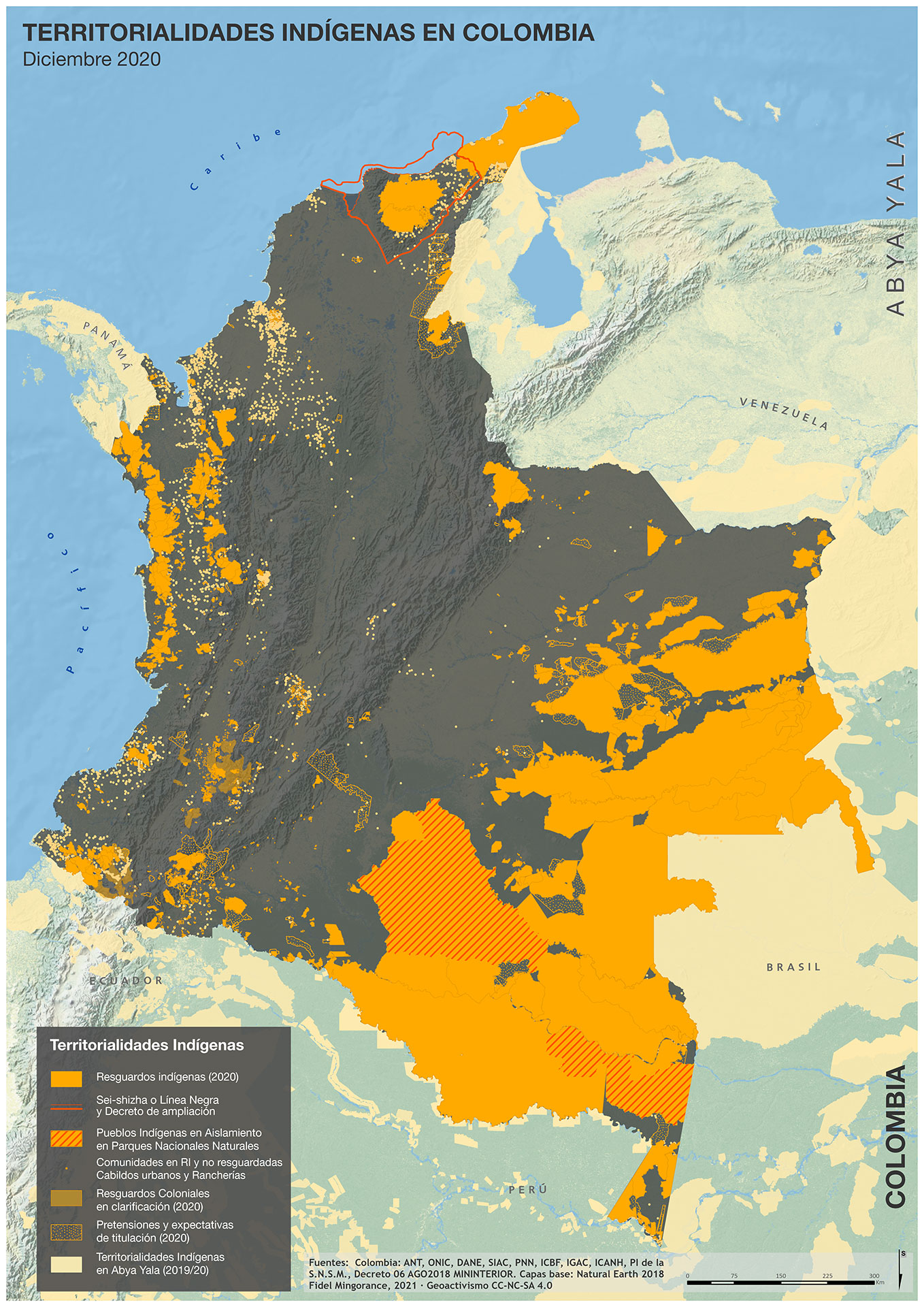
Indigenous territories (resguardo indigena) within Colombia represented in orange

Amerindian population of Colombia by municipality in 2005. 61.4% - 100% 29.6% - 61.3% 11.7% - 29.5% 2.9% - 11.6% 0% - 2.8% Without data

An Indigenous territory (Spanish: territorio indigena) in Colombia is an area of land reserved for use of the Indigenous peoples of Colombia. Almost one third of the country is covered by these territories, although the Indigenous people account for just over 4-10% of the population.

== Legal situation ==
As late as 1959, the Amazon region was considered uninhabited and was declared a natural reserve. The agrarian reform of 1961 recognized the need to define Indigenous territories and to confirm as reserves (resguardos) the titles the Spanish crown had granted to the Indigenous people. The first reserves were in the Amazon, the Vaupés reserve in 1982 with 3,375,125 hectares (8,340,120 acres) and the Vichada reserve in 1986–87 with 194,517 hectares (480,660 acres). The government of Virgilio Barco Vargas between 1986 and 1990 gave titles to another 13,000,000 hectares (32,000,000 acres) in the Amazonas and Guainía departments, forming a continuous indigenous territory of 20,000,000 hectares (49,000,000 acres) covering 50% of the Colombian Amazon.

The 1991 National Constitution of Colombia defined Territorial Entities (Entidades Territoriales) as departments, districts, municipalities, and Indigenous territories. Within an Indigenous Territory Entity (ETI) the people have autonomy in managing their interests, and within the limits of the constitution have the right to manage resources and define taxes required to perform their duties. ETIs are to be defined by the government in conformance with the Organic Law on Land Management. However, this law has yet to be sanctioned so in practice the territories are unregulated.

== Geographical distribution ==
The total area of Colombia is 114,174,800 hectares (282,132,000 acres). 36,000,000 hectares (89,000,000 acres), or 31.5%, is covered by Indigenous territories. According to the 2005 census there were 41,468,384 people in the country of whom 1,378,884, or 3.28%, belonged to one of the 87 groups of Indigenous people. The great majority of the Indigenous people live in the Andean and Orinoco (savannah) zones. Large numbers in the Orinoco and Pacific Rim have land titles, but most in the Andes do not. Just 5% live in reserves (resguardos) in the Amazon zone. There are 156 reserves in the Amazon covering 25,600,000 hectares (63,000,000 acres), or 64% of the total. These lands hold disproportionate significance for the conservation of biodiversity, including wide-ranging species such as jaguars.

== Issues ==
Some areas claimed by the Indigenous people of the Amazon are used for mining and hydrocarbon operations. There is some overlap between protected areas administered under the National Parks System and the Indigenous territories. Pressures on the Indigenous peoples include depletion of the land, particularly in the Andes, and forced displacement due to the struggle with illegal armed groups. Gold mining and spraying of illegal crops causes pollution of the rivers, and in some areas the rivers are polluted by garbage. Oil extraction and dam construction also cause environmental problems in the reserves.
