= Administrative act =

Administrative act may refer to:

- Acte administratif unilatéral en France
- Acto administrativo en España
- Verwaltungsakt (Deutschland)

Administrative procedure act

- Administrative Procedure Act (Japan)
- Administrative Procedure Act (United States)
