= Municipal territory =

Territory of a Spanish municipality

Municipal territory (in Spanish: término municipal), ejido or municipal radius is the territory over which the administrative action of a local government (city council or municipality) extends.

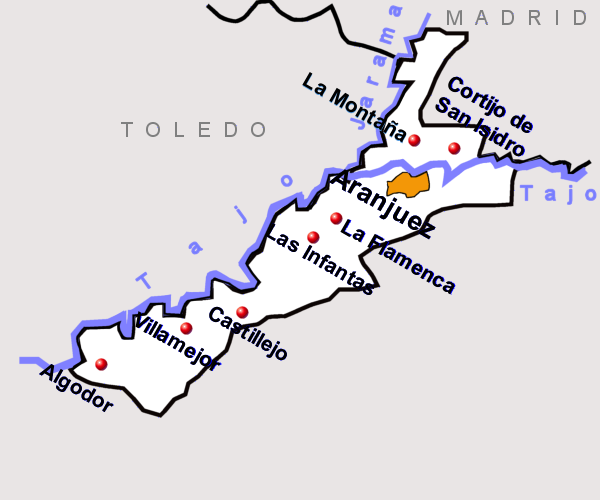
Municipal district of Aranjuez, in Madrid (Spain).

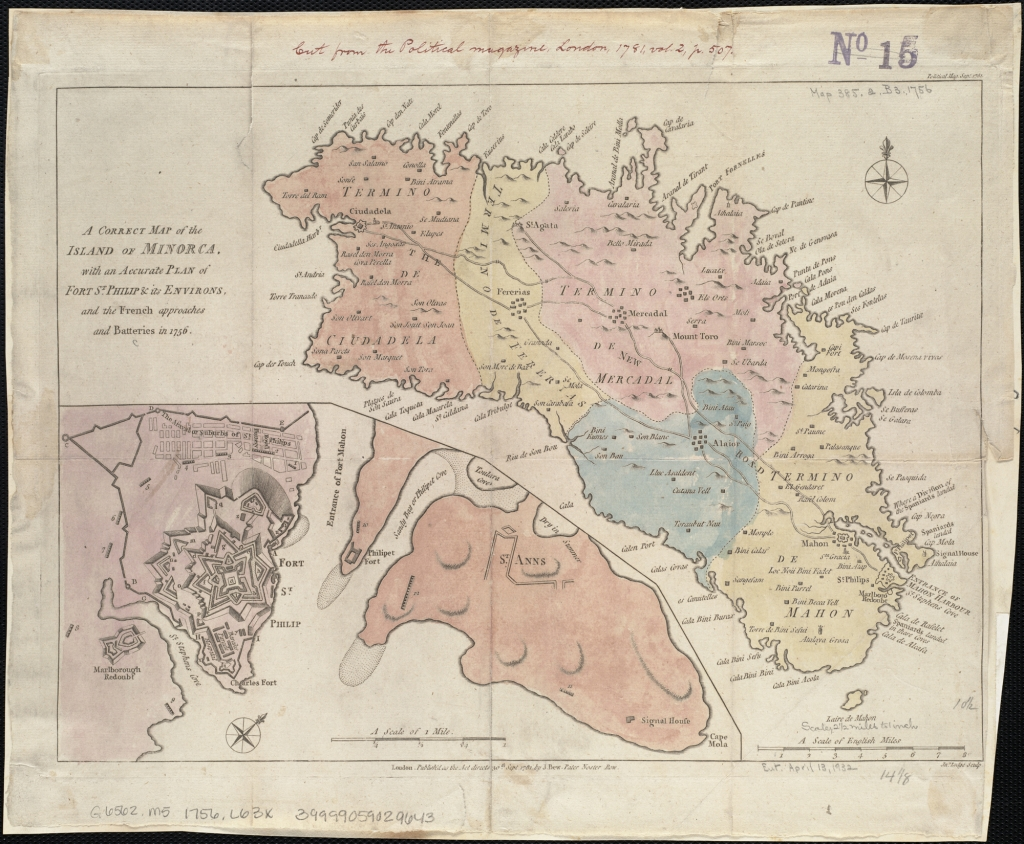
Municipal boundaries of Menorca in 1756.

== Spain ==
A municipal territory (in Spanish: término municipal, T.M.), in Spain, is the territory, perfectly delimited, of a municipality; the territory to which the administrative action of a city council extends. Law 7/1985, of April 2, 1985, Regulating the Bases of the Local Regime, in its Article 12.1 defines it as follows:

The municipal district is the territory in which the municipality exercises its competencies.

Each Spanish province is defined as the territorial grouping of its municipalities. Practically the entire national territory is divided into municipalities. There are currently 8131 municipalities in Spain.

The extension of a municipality, according to the National Statistics Institute, is the extension of its municipal area.

Within the municipal area there may be one or several singular population entities. One of these, where the town hall is located, is the capital of the municipality.

The singular entities can be grouped into collective population entities, which receive different names depending on the area: parishes, pedanías, elizates, etc.

== Argentina ==
The municipal territory in Argentina is called ejido or municipal radius and in its origin, which dates back to the viceroyalty, they were public spaces at the exit of the urban layout. They were first administered by the cabildo, then by the provincial treasury and, from 1857, by the newly formed municipality. In the last decades of the 19th century, they were privatized.

The general guidelines for the division of the territory of the provinces and the establishment of the limits of the municipalities are established in the provincial constitutions and the definitive establishment of limits is delegated to the Legislative Power.

There are various systems for the territorial determination of the municipality:

- Urban ejido: according to which the limits of the municipality coincide with those of the urbanized space. The management of territories outside the ejidos is the responsibility of the provincial state. This system is applied in the provinces of San Luis and Santa Cruz.
- Adjoining ejidos: in which the ejidos include an urban and a rural area so that the entire provincial territory is included within local governments with common limits. This is the regime adhered to by half of the provinces in Argentina.
- Mixed: In which the ejidos include an urban area and a rural area surrounding it, but between them there are areas not included in any municipality. This system is dominant in 10 provinces: 6 in the north: Tucumán, Santiago del Estero, Chaco, Formosa, Corrientes and Entre Ríos; and 4 in Patagonia: Neuquén, Río Negro, Chubut and Tierra del Fuego.

Each system has advantages and disadvantages. The urban ejido system is in line with the traditional concept of municipality, in charge of city affairs and with a direct management with own neighbors. With respect to the dispersed rural population or small towns, the system of neighboring ejidos has the possibility of integrating and attending to them from the municipal level. The mixed system does so with the population of its closest surroundings. On the other hand, these systems subordinate these localities even when they have reached the conditions to become a municipality. With respect to territorial planning, this is facilitated if the municipality has jurisdiction over the surrounding rural area (as in the system of adjacent ejidos or the mixed system).

The provincial division into municipal ejidos coexists with the division into second level entities called departments in 22 provinces and partidos in the province of Buenos Aires. This territorial element is often empty of content, since there is no equivalent institutional body or it has no effective power in the territory. In general, the departments group several local governments, except in the provinces of Buenos Aires and the Cuyo provinces of Mendoza, San Juan and La Rioja, where the department (or partido) coincides with the municipal district.

== See also ==
- List of municipalities of Spain

== Bibliography ==
- Law 7/1985, of April 2, Regulating the Local Regime Bases in noticias.juridicas.com (in Spanish).
- Término municipal in www.enciclopedia-juridica.biz14.com (in Spanish).
