= Social development =

Social development can refer to:

- Psychosocial development
- Social change
- Social development theory
- Social Development (journal)
- Social emotional development
- Social progress or social regress
