= Districts of Colombia =

Special municipalities in the country of Colombia, South America

Districts
- Current districts in red, extinct ones in orange
- Category: Second-level administrative division
- Location: Colombia
- Found in: Departments
- Created: 1991
- Number: 11 (as of 2021)
- Government: Mayor's Office; District council
- Subdivisions: Localities

The term district is used in Colombia to refer to second-level territorial entities (municipalities) endowed with an independent legal, political, fiscal and administrative regime, with special characteristics that set them apart from others in terms of their economy, resources, culture, or administrative and geographic role.

== History ==
The first district created in Colombia was the Federal District (1861), which was the forerunner of the Special District in 1954. Much later, the Constitution of 1991, in its article 356, created the districts of the three main cities of the north of the country: Barranquilla, Cartagena de Indias and Santa Marta. The same 1991 constitution changed the name of Bogotá to Santafé de Bogotá, Capital District, which changed again in 2000 to Bogotá, Capital District.

In July 2007, Legislative Act 02 amended the Constitution and included Cúcuta, Popayán, Tunja, Buenaventura, Turbo and Tumaco as districts. However, in 2009 a large part of this act was declared unenforceable (inexequible), leaving only the districts of Bogotá, Barranquilla, Santa Marta, Cartagena and Buenaventura recognized.

In July 2015 the plenary of the Senate approved the bill granting district status to Riohacha, capital of the department of La Guajira.

In September 2017 the plenary of the Senate approved the bill that would grant district status to the town of Mompox, in the department of Bolívar. On 27 December, through presidential assent, Mompox became a Special, Tourist, Historic and Cultural District.

On 24 January 2018 the municipality of Turbo was elevated to Port, Logistics, Industrial, Tourist and Commercial District of Colombia through Law 1883 of 2018. On 17 July of the same year, Tumaco became a Special, Industrial, Port, Biodiverse and Ecotourism District. On 2 August of the same year, President Juan Manuel Santos signed the law that made Cali a Special District.

On 13 June 2019, the Congress of the Republic declared the municipality of Barrancabermeja a Special Port, Industrial, Tourist and Biodiverse District. On 14 July 2021 the Congress of the Republic granted the municipality of Medellín the status of Special District.

Like every newly created district, at the beginning of the following year they must organize themselves into localities, and all the laws applicable to a special district will duly apply to them.

== Requirements for creation ==
According to Law 1617 of 2013, the creation of new districts requires meeting the following conditions:

1. They must have more than 600,000 inhabitants, according to certification by the DANE, or be located in coastal areas, provided they have potential for the development of ports or for tourism and culture; or be the capital municipality of a border department.
2. There must be a prior opinion from the special commissions for monitoring the decentralization and territorial planning process.
3. There must also be a prior opinion from the municipal councils.

Exempt from meeting these requirements are those districts that have been recognized as such by the Constitution and the law, or municipalities that have been declared World Heritage Sites by UNESCO.

== Administrative regime ==
The Capital District.

In 2013 the Congress of the Republic issued Law 1617, or the "District Regime Law" (Ley de Régimen de Distritos), which sets out the district organization, structure and operation, and establishes provisions for drawing up political, administrative and fiscal statutes, with the aim of unifying the various existing regimes in the country's districts: Barranquilla, Cartagena de Indias, Bogotá and Santa Marta. With this law the provisions were updated and contextualized and Buenaventura was included, so the law, in addition to unifying, is regulatory. The district law does not guarantee resources of any kind; however, with that category it becomes a priority for special funds to be allocated for the development of projects.

=== Bogotá, Capital District ===
As a capital district, Bogotá is the only municipality that receives resources directly from the nation, and for that reason it has the same powers as a department, since, unlike the other districts of Colombia, Bogotá is a first-order territorial entity, with the administrative powers that the law confers on departments.

Administratively, it is governed by a Mayor who plays the same role as a departmental governor; although Bogotá has a special relationship with the department of Cundinamarca, as its capital, the latter exercises no authority over the district, neither the governor nor the departmental assembly. This is because Bogotá is provided for in the Colombian Political Constitution as the only district that, together with the 32 departments, makes up a total of 33 different administrative units that are independent of one another.

At the judicial level, Bogotá and Cundinamarca share a single Administrative Tribunal, although each entity has its own Superior Tribunal. Likewise, the Regional Autonomous Corporation of Cundinamarca acts as the environmental authority in the rural area of the district and over the basin of the Bogotá River, but the urban area of the district is under the responsibility of the District Environmental Secretariat.

== Full official names ==
- Bogotá, Capital District.
- Barrancabermeja, Special, Port, Industrial, Tourist and Biodiverse District.
- Barranquilla, Special, Industrial and Port District.
- Buenaventura, Special, Industrial, Port, Biodiverse and Ecotourism District.
- Cartagena de Indias, Special, Tourist, Cultural and Historic District.
- Medellín, Special District of Science, Technology and Innovation.
- Riohacha, Special, Tourist and Cultural District.
- San Andrés de Tumaco, Special, Industrial, Port, Biodiverse and Ecotourism District.
- Santa Cruz de Mompox, Special Tourist, Cultural and Historic District.
- Santa Marta, Special Tourist, Cultural and Historic District.
- Santiago de Cali, Special, Sports, Cultural, Tourist, Business and Services District.
- Turbo, Special Port, Logistics, Tourist, Industrial and Commercial District.

== See also ==
- Administrative divisions of Colombia
- Constitution of Colombia of 1991
