= Departmental Assembly =

Composition of the departmental assemblies after the 2023 regional elections

In Colombia, the Departmental Assemblies (Asambleas Departamentales), occasionally called Departmental Dumas (Dumas Departamentales), are public institutions of a political and administrative nature that enjoy administrative autonomy and their own budget. They are made up of no fewer than 11 and no more than 31 deputies, elected in each department by direct and universal vote for a term of four years,Constituent National Assembly & 6 July 1991, Article 299 with the possibility of immediate re-election. They issue ordinances and resolutions that are binding within their territorial jurisdiction. Their equivalent in cities are the municipal councils, and in corregimientos, comunas or localities they are the local administrative boards. In the broadest sense, their equivalent at the national level is the Congress, which is the only legislative body of the Colombian State because it is a unitary state.

To be elected deputy, a person must be a citizen in good standing, must not have been sentenced to a custodial penalty (except for political or unintentional offenses), and must have resided in the respective electoral district during the year immediately preceding the date of the election.

Bogotá, being the Capital District, has no representation in any departmental assembly, since, enjoying autonomy in managing its own interests, that role is assumed by the Council of Bogotá. In addition, the non-municipalized areas (including San Andrés Island), being administered directly by the departmental governor, are served by the assembly, which exercises the functions of a municipal council for this territorial entity.

== History ==
There were initially nine departmental assemblies (including the then Department of Panama), replacing the state parliaments that existed during the federal system of the Constitution of Rionegro.

For many years, the Senate of the Republic was elected indirectly, through the departmental assemblies.

== Composition ==
Since 2007 the total number of deputies has been 418.

Departmental Assemblies
Department	Number of deputies
Department	Total assigned
Amazonas	11
Antioquia	26
Arauca	11
Atlántico	14
Bolívar	14
Boyacá	16
Caldas	14
Caquetá	11
Casanare	11
Cauca	13
Cesar	11
Chocó	11
Córdoba	13
Cundinamarca	16
Guainía	11
Guaviare	11
Huila	12
La Guajira	11
Magdalena	13
Meta	11
Nariño	14
Norte de Santander	13
Putumayo	11
Quindío	11
Risaralda	12
San Andrés y Providencia	11
Santander	16
Sucre	11
Tolima	15
Valle del Cauca	21
Vaupés	11
Vichada	11

== See also ==
- Departments of Colombia

== Bibliography ==
- National Constituent Council (5 August 1886). Constitución de Colombia de 1886 (in Spanish).
- Constituent National Assembly (6 July 1991). Constitución de Colombia de 1991 (in Spanish).
