= National territories (Colombia) =

The national territories (Spanish: territorios nacionales) were a group of regions of Colombia that were located very far from Bogotá and had sparse populations. This administrative entity existed from 1843 to 1991, when the political constitution of that year abolished the national territories and established the current political division of the country.

The defining characteristic of these areas of Colombia was their economic and social backwardness relative to the rest of the country, which is why they were always seen as marginal regions, incapable of self-government, that had to depend on the central government for their administration. This situation dated from the Spanish colonization, during which these areas of the viceroyalty were seen as hotbeds of insurgency and as a frontier to be exploited. The President of the Republic appointed a prefect to administer each territory, who held special political, fiscal, military and judicial powers.

== Chronology ==
=== Republic of New Granada ===
Territories of Colombia between 1843 and 1898.

After the constitutional reform of 1843, the idea arose of creating a type of subnational entity in those places of the Republic that were very remote or isolated from population centers and had sparse populations, whose special regime would allow the laws enshrined in the constitution to be faithfully upheld. In fact, one of the objectives of the Chorographic Commission was to produce a map of the nation that included these regions, although in practice the commission never explored uninhabited areas such as the Amazon basin or the Caribbean coast.

The first of these was Bocas del Toro (in present-day Panama), which comprised that province as well as the Mosquito Coast and other nearby areas. The regime created for this territory was later extended to the other national territories: the President of the Republic directly appointed a prefect to administer it, who held special political, fiscal, military and judicial powers. These entities were created between 1843 and 1848, although most were abolished in 1850. They were:

Territory	Dates	Capital	Location
Bocas del Toro	1843–1850	Bocas del Toro	Near the border with Costa Rica
Caquetá	1845–1858	Mocoa	It covered the entire Amazon region of present-day Colombia.
Darién	1846–1850	Chimán	Around the Gulf of Urabá and the Darién mountain range
Guanacas	1847–1849	Inzá	Comprised the lands of the Tierradentro culture
La Guajira	1846–1858	Riohacha	On the peninsula of the same name
Raposo	1848–1849	Raposo	On the Bay of Buenaventura on the Pacific coast.
San Martín	1846–1856	San Martín	Eastern plains
San Andrés and Providencia	1847–1850	San Andrés	It became part of New Granada through the Royal Decree of 20 November 1803.

=== United States of Colombia ===
After the change of the country's name and political regime in 1858, several of the Granadine territories were re-created but with a different type of administration, since, although their area lay within the territorial scope of the Sovereign States, the latter had no control over these regions, and their management was entrusted to the federal government. They were:

Territory	Dates	Capital	State (jurisdiction)
Bolívar	1870–1886	Landázuri	Santander
Caquetá	1858–1886	Mocoa	Cauca
Casanare	1868–1886	Támara (and later Tame and Nunchía)	Boyacá
La Guajira	1858–1898	Riohacha (and later Soldado)	Magdalena
San Andrés and Providencia	1866–1886	San Andrés	Bolívar
San Martín	1866–1886	San Martín (and later Villavicencio)	Cundinamarca
Sierra Nevada and Motilones	1871–1886	Espíritu Santo	Magdalena
Vásquez	1883–1963	Puerto Reyes	Cundinamarca

=== Republic of Colombia ===
Territories of Colombia between 1905 and 1991, the year in which their status was raised to that of departments.

With the Constitution of 1886, the country returned to a centralist regime and the national territories disappeared, being reintegrated into the departments. This situation lasted until 1905, when President Rafael Reyes implemented a new political division of the country and reinstated the territories, but under the names of intendancies and commissaries. These came to comprise between 40% and 50% of Colombian land and accounted for almost 78% of the national borders with other countries.

The first to be created were the intendancies of Caquetá and Putumayo, which were short-lived, as in 1906 both were abolished and reintegrated into the departments from which they had been formed. In 1909 a new reform restored not only these intendancies but also those of San Martín, Casanare, La Guajira and Chocó. The following year the commissaries of Vaupés, Arauca, Putumayo and Vichada were created. From then until 1954, the national territories moved back and forth between departmental and national control, being created and dissolved with no apparent consistency. Finally, in that year, the parameters were set for creating and abolishing intendancies and commissaries, or raising them to the status of departments. In 1975, the Administrative Department of Intendancies and Commissaries was created to handle the central government's dispositions regarding them. In 1991, the new constitution raised the existing national territories to departments and abolished that category.

Intendancies
Intendancy	Dates	Capital
Amazonas	1931–1943	Leticia
Arauca	1955–1991	Arauca
Caquetá	1905–1906, 1909–1912, 1950–1981	Florencia
Casanare	1973–1991	Yopal
Chocó	1906–1908, 1909–1947	Quibdó
La Guajira	1898–1911, 1954–1965	Riohacha
Meta	1905–1959	Villavicencio
Oriente	1900–1905	San José de Maipures
Putumayo	1905–1906, 1968–1991	Mocoa
San Andrés and Providencia	1912–1991	San Andrés

Commissaries
Commissary	Dates	Capital
Amazonas	1928–1931, 1943–1991	Leticia
Arauca	1911–1955	Arauca
Caquetá	1912–1950	Florencia
Guainía	1963–1991	Puerto Obando
Guaviare	1977–1991	San José del Guaviare
Juradó	1911–1915	Juradó
La Guajira	1911–1954	Riohacha
Putumayo	1912–1953, 1957–1968	Mocoa
Urabá	1911–1915	Acandí
Vaupés	1910–1991	Mitú
Vichada	1913–1991	Puerto Carreño

The intendancies were divided into municipalities and intendancy corregimientos, while the commissaries were divided into commissary corregimientos; nevertheless, the law allowed for municipalities within the commissaries when the legal conditions were met and the government deemed it appropriate for special reasons.

== See also ==
- Administrative divisions of Colombia
- Departments of Colombia
