= Localities of Bogotá =

Divisions of the Capital District of Bogotá, Colombia

The Capital District of Bogotá is divided into 20 localities (localidades): 19 urban and one rural. Several of these were once municipalities adjacent to the capital of Colombia.

== Territorial division ==

Each locality has one or more postal codes and is divided into postal zones.

No.	Locality	Postal codes	Area (km²)	Population	Density (inhabitants/km²)
01	Usaquén	110111-110151	65.54	503 767	7 686.4
02	Chapinero	110211-110231	35.78	139 701	3 904.44
03	Santa Fe	110311-110321	44.82	109 195	2 436.3
04	San Cristóbal	110411-110441	48.83	402 554	8 243.98
05	Usme	110511-110571	122.63	457 302	3 729.12
06	Tunjuelito	110611-110621	10.79	217 139	20 124.11
07	Bosa	110711-110741	24.22	681 234	28 126.91
08	Kennedy	110811-110881	38.72	1 092 110	28 205.31
09	Fontibón	110911-110931	33.32	395 122	11 858.41
10	Engativá	111011-111071	36.06	891 530	24 723.52
11	Suba	111111-111176	101.07	1 124 692	11 127.85
12	Barrios Unidos	111211-111221	11.92	243 874	20 459.24
13	Teusaquillo	111311-111321	14.2	153 133	10 784
14	Los Mártires	111411	6.53	99 423	15 225.65
15	Antonio Nariño	111511	4.99	111 637	22 372.12
16	Puente Aranda	111611-111631	17.24	257 242	14 921.25
17	La Candelaria	111711	1.83	24 088	13 162.84
18	Rafael Uribe Uribe	111811-111841	13.44	374 246	27 845.68
19	Ciudad Bolívar	111911-111981	130	733 859	5 645.06
20	Sumapaz	112011-112041	780.96	6 529	8.36

== History ==
Six of the 20 localities were municipalities of the department of Cundinamarca: Engativá, Fontibón, Suba, Usme, Usaquén and Bosa. On 17 December 1954, when the definitive boundary of the newly created Special District of Bogotá was determined, they were integrated into that entity.

The first local mayoralty (alcaldía local) was that of Chapinero in 1960; in 1964 the local mayoralty of Puente Aranda was created, and in 1967 that of Kennedy, splitting off territory from Bosa and Fontibón.

By the 1970s, the entire District was divided into 16 minor mayoralties, including the annexed municipalities. The new mayoralties were those of the three traditional central sectors: Santa Fe, Teusaquillo and Los Mártires. Suba, Barrios Unidos, Antonio Nariño, San Cristóbal and Tunjuelito were formed.

In 1977 the Local Mayoralty of La Candelaria was created, and in 1983, owing to the disorder generated by land invasions in southern Bogotá, the government established the Ciudad Bolívar plan, and it became another locality of the city, separated from Bosa.

With the Constitution of 1991, the Special District became the Capital District and the zones were raised to localities, dividing the District into 20 localities, now including Rafael Uribe Uribe (separated from Antonio Nariño and taking a part of Usme) and Sumapaz. In 1992 the District Council gave it greater legal support, dividing the city into twenty localities on the basis of Law 01 of 1992.

== Subdivisions ==
Each of the 20 localities of the Capital District (except Sumapaz) is divided into Local Planning Units, made up of the city's various neighborhoods, in accordance with the Land Use Plan.

The locality of Sumapaz is divided into two Rural Planning Units (Unidades de Planeación Rural, UPR), which include 5 populated centers and 26 veredas.

=== Local Planning Units ===
The Bogotá Land Use Plan (POT) 2022–2035 established the new Functional Spatial Units under the name of Local Planning Units (Unidades de Planeamiento Local, UPL), into which most of the former UPZs were merged, according to their demographics (each will have fewer than 500,000 inhabitants) as well as various factors, for example, identity and heritage aspects, socioeconomic similarities and the Manhattan distance to assess the proximity of two points.

The UPLs aim to make the city "one that is closer and better distributed" by reducing travel times for carrying out different everyday activities. That is, the idea is that 30 minutes of walking, cycling or public transport should not be exceeded. In this sense, the UPLs defined those areas that require greater facilities for the provision of social and essential care services, as well as formal employment opportunities and decent housing supply. This is intended to guarantee greater availability and better conditions in the quality of life of the inhabitants.

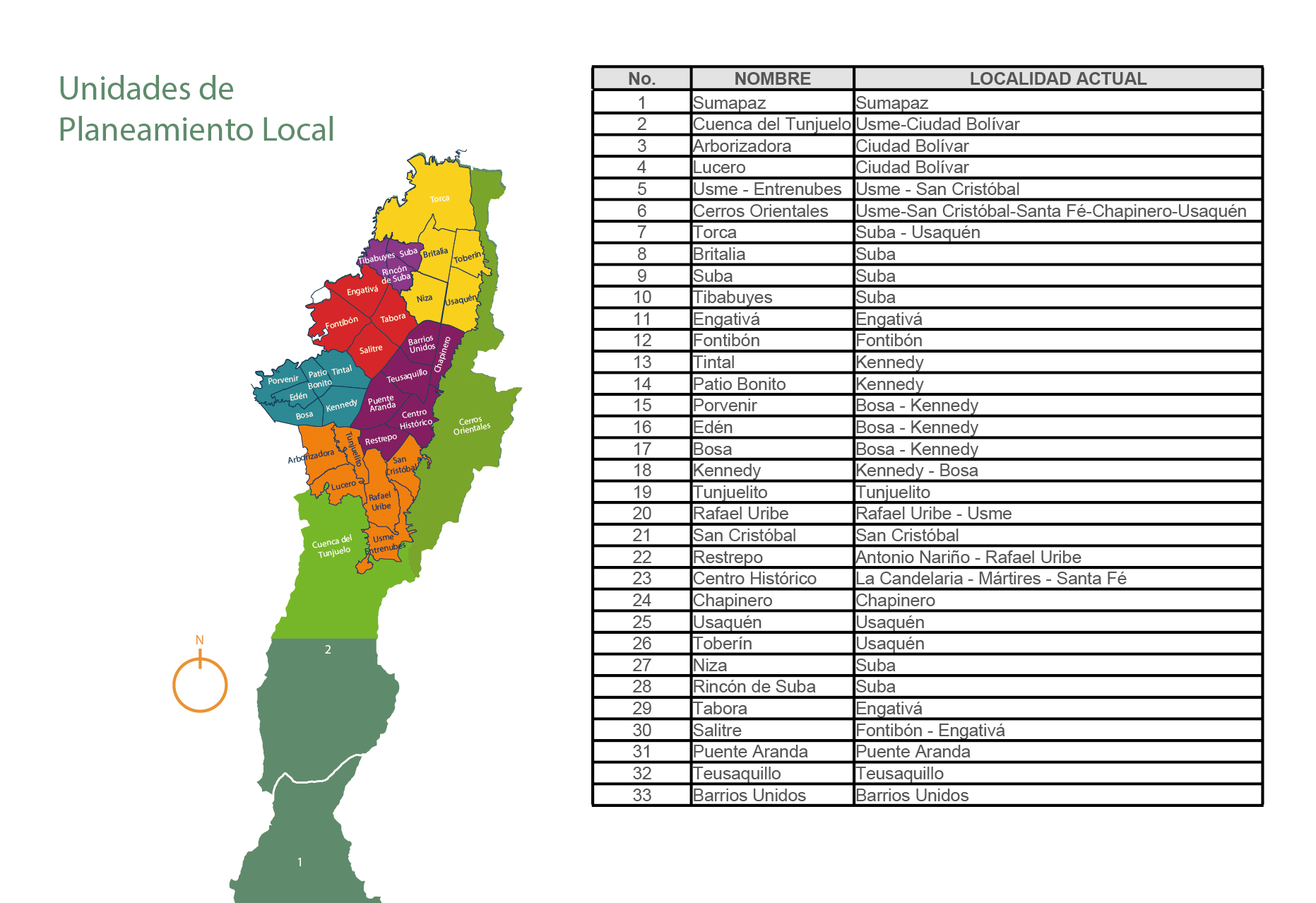
Local Planning Units of Bogotá, D.C. and their zones.

The distribution of these territorial units was carried out in seven sectors as follows:

Sector	Local Planning Units (UPL)
Expanded Center or Santafé	Centro Histórico, Teusaquillo, Restrepo, Puente Aranda, Barrios Unidos and Chapinero.
North	Britalia, Toberín, Usaquén, Niza and Torca.
Northwest	Suba, Rincón de Suba and Tibabuyes.
West	Fontibón, Engativá, Tabora and Salitre.
Southwest	Bosa, Tintal, Kennedy, Patio Bonito, Edén and Porvenir.
Southeast	Arborizadora, Lucero, Tunjuelito, Rafael Uribe Uribe, Usme Entrenubes and San Cristóbal.
Rural	Sumapaz, Tunjuelo basin and Eastern Hills.

==== Transformation of UPLs into localities according to the 2022 POT ====
It was stipulated that the Centro Histórico UPL would result in the merger of the localities of La Candelaria, Los Mártires and Santa Fe into a new locality, in accordance with the boundaries of the Special Management and Protection Plan of the Historic Center (PEMP).

These UPLs and/or their sectors could later be raised to the category of localities. However, since the POT was not approved by the Bogotá City Council, this idea was discarded.

== See also ==
- History of Bogotá
- Zonal Planning Units
- Neighborhoods of Bogotá
- Land Use Plan
