= Police inspection (Colombia) =

The coexistence inspectorates (inspecciones de convivencia, formerly "Inspección de policía") and the corregidurías in Colombia are administrative entities at the municipal level. Inspectors and corregidores are support authorities throughout the national territory whose main function is to promote peaceful and harmonious relations in the community, as well as to conciliate and resolve, through police regulations, matters arising in the exercise of civic coexistence.

Law 2492 of 2025 establishes that each mayor's office shall have the number of coexistence inspectors that the mayor considers necessary for the prompt and effective performance of the police function in the municipality. In addition, there shall be coexistence inspectorates operating permanently 24 hours a day in departmental capitals and in municipalities with a population of more than one hundred thousand inhabitants.

== Powers ==
Urban and rural coexistence inspectors and/or corregidores have the following powers:

1. To conciliate in order to resolve coexistence conflicts, when appropriate.
2. To hear cases of behavior contrary to coexistence in matters of security, tranquility, environment and natural resources, right of assembly, protection of property and privacy, economic activity, urban planning, public space and freedom of movement.
3. To enforce restitution orders in cases involving communal lands.
4. To hear, in a single instance, the application of the following corrective measures: Repair of material damage to movable or immovable property; Eviction from a dwelling; Prohibition of entry to activities involving complex or non-complex crowds; Confiscation.
5. To hear, in first instance, the application of the following corrective measures: Suspension of construction or demolition; Demolition of works; Construction, enclosure, repair or maintenance of property; Repair of material damage caused by disturbance of the possession and holding of real property; Restitution and protection of real property, other than that described in numeral 17 of article 205; Reestablishment of easement rights and repair of material damage; Removal of property in cases of urban planning infractions; Fines; Definitive suspension of activity.
6. To carry out the commissions referred to in article 38 of the Código General del Proceso (General Procedural Code) or to subcommission an authority with jurisdiction and competence, who shall act temporarily as an administrative police authority.
7. To develop strategies in the areas of peace education, conflict resolution and restorative justice.
8. Any others assigned by the Constitution, the law, ordinances and agreements.

== Inspectors in populated centers ==
Law 1681 of 2013 establishes that where a corregidor is appointed there shall be no police inspectors, since such corregidores shall perform those functions. Mayors appoint the corregidor from a shortlist of three submitted by the respective Local Administrative Board (Junta Administradora Local, JAL).

Therefore, if a populated center is not part of a corregimiento, it may have a coexistence inspectorate as "a judicial body over a rural populated center that depends on the department or the municipality, whose main authority is an inspector".

== See also ==
- Personería
- Corregimientos of Colombia
