= Municipalities of Colombia =

Municipality
- Category: Second-level administrative division
- Location: Colombia
- Found in: Departments
- Created: 1858
- Number: 1,103 (as of 2022)
- Government: Municipal mayor; Municipal Council

The municipalities of Colombia are second-level territorial entities of Colombia that, grouped together, make up the departments. Colombia has 1,103 municipalities registered with DANE, a count that includes the special districts, which are also counted as municipalities for statistical purposes.

The municipalities of Colombia have a municipal seat, populated centers and a dispersed rural area. Each municipality has a municipal seat, a town that usually bears the same name as the municipality and serves as its capital. There are approximately 39 cases in which the name of the municipality differs from that of its seat (see List of heteronymous municipalities of Colombia).

Under Article 311 of the Constitution of 1991 and Law 136 of 2 June 1994, the municipality is the fundamental territorial entity of the political-administrative division of the state, with political, fiscal and administrative autonomy within the limits set by the Constitution and the laws of the Republic, in the framework of administrative decentralization in Colombia.

== History ==
In the constitutions of 1811, 1832 and 1843, as well as in the constitutions of Gran Colombia, the territory of New Granada (today Colombia) was divided into cantons, which were grouped into provinces. The Constitution of 1853 abolished the cantons, so the national territory of New Granada was divided into the sub-entities that had previously made up the cantons, that is, parish districts.

The federal constitution of 1858 created the federal states, later called sovereign states by the Constitution of Rionegro. According to their internal statutes, these were subdivided into provinces or departments and into territories. They also contained districts, which were no longer parish districts but municipal ones.

Later, the centralist constitution of 1886 transformed the states into departments, which were in turn subdivided into provinces and these into municipal districts. It was not until after the reforms of 1905 and 1910 that provinces officially ceased to exist as territorial entities; with the creation of the Special District of Bogotá in 1954, the term municipal district was abandoned completely, leaving only the designation municipality.

However, the term district re-emerged with the promulgation of the 1991 constitution, which created several districts in order to distinguish certain municipalities from their neighbors on account of their importance in areas such as the economy, tourism, history and industry.

== Administrative regime ==
Each municipality has its own territorial and administrative organization.

Executive power is held by a mayor, elected by popular vote since 1988, who has served a four-year term since 2004. The mayor appoints a cabinet made up of secretaries.

There is also a collegiate co-administrative body, the municipal council. This is a public corporation responsible for issuing municipal agreements (acuerdos), which authorize actions by the mayor or regulate matters authorized by national laws. The municipal council is elected by popular vote for the same term as the mayor. Councils have between 7 and 21 members, depending on the population of the municipality. This is an administrative body and not a legislative one, since legislative power in Colombia is centralized in the Congress of the Republic, and the agreements issued by the council are administrative acts.

The judiciary is independent of the executive and is represented by the municipal courts.

Districts have a similar organization.

=== Districts ===
Typology of the second level of administrative division of Colombia (municipalities, districts and non-municipalized areas).

Districts are municipalities that have one or more characteristics that set them apart from the surrounding municipalities, such as their political, commercial, historical, touristic, cultural, industrial, environmental, port or border importance. Colombia has the following recognized districts: Bogotá (Capital District), Barrancabermeja, Barranquilla, Buenaventura, Cali, Cartagena de Indias, Medellín, Mompox, Riohacha, Santa Marta, Tumaco and Turbo.

Districts are divided into localities, which may contain barrios, populated centers and veredas.

==== Bogotá ====
The districts mentioned above are part of their respective departments, whereas Bogotá has a special relationship with the department of Cundinamarca: the latter exercises no authority over the Capital District, so Bogotá is a first-order entity, autonomous and independent of the department. The courts of Bogotá and Cundinamarca have jurisdiction over Bogotá, but the governor and the assembly do not.

== Municipal category ==
Categorization of the municipalities of Colombia under Law 617 of 2000, in 2022.

Before 31 October each year, mayors must issue a decree establishing the category in which the municipality or district will be classified for the following year. The Comptroller General of the Nation must then set it in November.

The law makes no distinction between municipalities and districts. In both cases, it states that population, current revenues of free allocation and geographic situation must be considered (Article 6 of Law 136 of 1994, as amended by Article 153 of Decree 2106 of 2019).

The categories are divided into three groups:

- Large municipalities: special category and first category.
- Intermediate municipalities: second, third and fourth category.
- Basic municipalities: fifth and sixth category.

Source: Article 1 of Law 617 of 2000
Category	Population		Current revenues of free allocation (ICLD) in SMMLV*	
Category	From	To	From	To
Special	500,001	999,999,999	400,001	999,999,999
First (1)	100,001	500,000	100,001	400,000
Second (2)	50,001	100,000	50,001	100,000
Third (3)	30,001	50,000	30,001	50,000
Fourth (4)	20,001	30,000	25,001	30,000
Fifth (5)	10,001	20,000	15,001	25,000
Sixth (6)	0	10,000	0	15,000

== Registry of municipalities and statistics ==
Article 11 of Law 1551 of 2012 states: "DANE will keep a registry of the municipalities that are created. To this end, the Governor of the respective department, once the process of creating a municipality has been completed, shall send a copy of the ordinance and its annexes to DANE and to the Ministry of the Interior."

Accordingly, the DANE, through DIVIPOLA (the national standard that codes and lists the territorial entities), records 1,103 municipalities.

The most recently created municipalities were:

- Guachené, in the department of Cauca (December 2006).
- San José de Uré and Tuchín, in the department of Córdoba (April 2007).
- Norosí, in the department of Bolívar (December 2007).
- Barrancominas, in the department of Guainía (July 2019).
- Nuevo Belén de Bajirá, in the department of Chocó (December 2022).

Municipalities and non-municipalized areas of Colombia (2022). Note the greater concentration of divisions in the center and northwest of the country than in the plains and Amazon rainforest regions.

=== List ===
Department	Municipalities	Non-municipalized areas
Amazonas	2	9
Antioquia	125	
Arauca	7	
Atlántico	23	
Bolívar	46	
Boyacá	123	
Caldas	27	
Caquetá	16	
Casanare	19	
Cauca	42	
Cesar	25	
Chocó	31	
Córdoba	30	
Cundinamarca	116	
Guainía	2	6
Guaviare	4	
Huila	37	
La Guajira	15	
Magdalena	30	
Meta	29	
Nariño	64	
Norte de Santander	40	
Putumayo	13	
Quindío	12	
Risaralda	14	
San Andrés and Providencia	1	1
Santander	87	
Sucre	26	
Tolima	47	
Valle del Cauca	42	
Vaupés	3	3
Vichada	4	
Bogotá, Capital District	1	

=== Statistics ===
- Largest municipality: Cumaribo in Vichada, with 65,193 km^{2} (25,171 sq mi).
- Smallest municipality: Sabaneta in Antioquia, with 15 km^{2} (5.8 sq mi).
- Entirely insular municipality: Providencia in the Department of San Andrés and Providencia.
- Municipalities with exclaves: Hatillo de Loba, Ocaña, Tumaco, and Ubalá.
- Entities with the most municipalities: Antioquia, with 125; Boyacá, witch 123; and Cundinamarca, witch 116.
- Entities with the fewest municipalities: San Andrés and Providencia and Capital District, with 1.
- Average number of municipalities per national entity: 33.
- Most populous municipality: Bogotá in the Capital District, with 7,901,653 inhabitants.
- Least populous municipality: Sativasur in Boyacá, with 1,127 inhabitants.
- Least populous municipal seat: Jordán in Santander, with 54 inhabitants.
- Municipality with a larger population than its departmental capital: Puerto Asís in Putumayo, the only such case nationwide.
- Municipality with the longest name: San Sebastián de Buenavista.
- Municipalities with the shortest names: Iza and Une.

== Creation and merger of municipalities ==
=== Requirements for the creation of a municipality ===
According to Laws 136 of 1994, 177 of 1994, 617 of 2000 and 1551 of 2012, a town must meet the following requirements to be established as a municipality:

1. The area of the proposed municipality must have its own identity, taking into account its natural, social, economic and cultural characteristics.
2. The territory must have at least 25,000 inhabitants, and the municipality or municipalities from which it is to be separated must not fall below this threshold as a result, according to certification by DANE. Likewise, the new municipality may not take more than one third of the territorial area of another municipality from which it seeks to separate.
3. The proposed municipality must guarantee annual current revenues of free allocation equivalent to 20,000 monthly minimum wages, for a period of no less than four years.
4. A study of the economic and social convenience and feasibility of the initiative, prepared by the departmental planning body.

If the new municipality meets these requirements, it is then declared by following these steps:

- Obtain a favorable opinion from the departmental planning body on the economic and social convenience of creating the municipality.
- Submit a draft ordinance to the respective Departmental Assembly.
- Once the ordinance and the referendum have been approved, the governor of the department must inform National Planning so that it allocates resources from the General System of Transfers during the initial months.
- During the first weeks, resources are allocated from the departmental budget.
- By special decrees, the governor must call elections for mayor and council and, if necessary, appoint an interim mayor.

If a new municipality is to be created within the jurisdiction of a special district, it falls to the special commissions for monitoring the decentralization and territorial planning process of the Senate and the Chamber of Representatives to determine or modify the boundaries of districts other than the Capital District of Bogotá, as well as to resolve boundary conflicts between a district and a municipality.

=== Merger of municipalities ===
The merger of municipalities is an administrative measure aimed at guaranteeing the fiscal and territorial sustainability of local entities. It may be applied for various reasons, such as the conurbation of municipal seats or the total overlap of territories between municipalities. However, the most frequent reason is failure to meet the minimum population required by current legislation, together with financial imbalances that affect institutional viability, such as exceeding the operating-expense limits established by Law 617 of 2000.

In such cases, the departmental assemblies may abolish the affected municipality and annex its territory to a neighboring one. This decision entails the proportional redistribution of assets, liabilities and contingencies, according to population and the origin of the resources. The abolished municipal councils may be reconfigured as Local Administrative Boards (JAL) within the corresponding local administrative unit of the receiving municipality.

== Other types of second-level administrative division ==
=== Non-municipalized areas ===
Non-municipalized areas are a special second-level territorial unit in Colombia, found in some departments that were formerly intendancies and commissariats. These areas correspond to certain populated centers which, together with their surroundings, do not belong to any existing municipality, unlike corregimientos, whose territorial jurisdiction is subordinate to a municipality.

Non-municipalized areas are coordinated by the departmental assembly and administered by an inspector appointed by the governor of the department to which they belong. Although the 1991 political constitution does not contemplate this figure, it is regulated by presidential decree. There are currently 19 non-municipalized areas in the country (including the San Andrés Island).

== See also ==
- List of Colombian municipalities by population
- List of municipalities in Colombia by area
- List of municipalities in Colombia by GDP
- List of heteronymous municipalities of Colombia
