= Vereda =

Subdivisional administrative part of a municipality in Colombia

Vereda (Spanish pronunciation: [beˈɾeða]) is a subdivisional administrative part of a municipality in Colombia. A Vereda typically has a Junta de Acción Vecinal (Neighbourhood Action Committee). Official statistics are published at the level of Vereda.
