= Populated center =

A populated center (Spanish: Centro poblado) is a settlement, particularly a rural one, that has certain urban characteristics that distinguish it from clusters of houses or other dispersed habitations. The term is used mainly in Colombia and Peru.

== Colombia ==
In Colombia, a populated center is defined as a concentration of at least 20 contiguous, neighboring or attached dwellings, located outside the urban perimeter of the seat of a municipality, district or non-municipalized area. Such a cluster has some urban characteristics, such as vehicular and pedestrian roads. It also has basic public utilities and social and welfare infrastructure, which at times serve the dispersed population (veredas) in its area of influence.

The concept covers the following types of settlements:

- Caserío (hamlet): a populated center usually located beside a main road and having no civil authority. Its census boundary is defined by the dwellings that make up the cluster.
- Inspección: a rural populated center that has a police inspectorate but lacks a Local Administrative Board (Junta Administradora Local).
- The seats of corregimientos.

These are registered by DANE, which assigns each its own Divipola code. The land use (rural, suburban or urban) of these centers is determined by the municipality's land use plan (Plan de Ordenamiento Territorial, POT).

Administration

- A civil authority (a police inspector) may or may not be assigned to these populated centers.
- Municipal councils may grant them administrative functions under a Local Administrative Board, which submits a shortlist of three candidates from which the corregidor is appointed. This intermediate body is called a Corregimiento.

== Ecuador ==
In Ecuador, populated centers are the cities that are cantonal seats, the parish seats, and localities that, without having political-administrative status, show a block-based layout (amanzanamiento).

== Peru ==
A populated center is any rural or urban place in the national territory that is identified by a name and inhabited with the intention of permanence. Its inhabitants are linked by shared economic, social, cultural and historical interests. Depending on their attributes, populated centers can attain categories such as caserío (hamlet), pueblo (town), villa, city and metropolis.

The populated centres of Peru (Spanish: Centros poblados; CC.PP.), are the fourth-level administrative subdivisions and the lowest administrative subdivision of the country. They are subdivisions of the districts, which in turn are subdivisions of provinces, which in turn are subdivisions of the regions. As of 2022, there are 2,859 populated centers in total, which are administered by municipalities headed by a mayor elected every four years.
