= Departments of Colombia =

Department, group of municipalities, in Colombia

Departments of Colombia Departamentos de Colombia (Spanish)
- Category: First-level administrative division
- Location: Colombia
- Created: 1886
- Number: 32 (as of 1991)
- Government: Governor
- Subdivisions: Municipalities

The 1991 Constitution establishes Colombia as a unitary and decentralized republic that is divided administratively and politically into 33 divisions: 32 departments, which are governed from their respective capital cities, and a capital district, Bogotá. In Colombia, resources pass from the nation to the department and from the department to the municipality, with the exception of Bogotá, which, as a capital district, is a first-order national entity.

Sovereignty rests with the Nation as a unit and, within the framework of administrative decentralization in Colombia, the 1991 Political Constitution recognizes in its article 286 the departments as territorial entities, whereby part of the administration of the State is shared among these 32 departments and the capital district, in addition to the municipalities.

== History ==
Territorial evolution of Colombian departments

1824

1886

1905

1908

1912

1916

1928

1942

1958

1966

1990

Present day

The origin of the Colombian departments lies in the political-administrative division of New Granada (today Colombia and Panama), which was organized into provinces that more or less corresponded territorially to the present-day departments. With the 1858 constitution, the nation's political system changed to that of a federal republic, its name became the United States of Colombia, and the provinces were replaced by nine sovereign states (Antioquia, Bolívar, Boyacá, Cauca, Cundinamarca, Magdalena, Panama, Santander and Tolima).

The centralist constitution of 1886 definitively changed the country's name to Republic of Colombia and converted the sovereign states into departments. The reforms of 1905 and 1910 set out the guidelines for splitting territories off from the various departments to form new entities (departments, intendancies and commissaries). With the new constitution of 1991, the existing intendancies and commissaries were promoted to departments.

== Administrative regime ==
=== Departments ===
Categorization of the departments of Colombia under Law 617 of 2000, in 2022.

In Colombia, the legislative power is centralized, since the country is a unitary (not federal) republic; that is, only the Congress of the Republic can legislate, while the executive branch does have representatives in the departments, municipalities and/or districts. It is mistakenly believed that the Departmental Assemblies and the municipal councils are legislative bodies, but these two public corporations are organs of the executive branch, and their acts, called administrative acts, although they constitute orders, are not laws. Therefore, there is no legislative or judicial power emanating from a territorial entity, whether a department, municipality or district. Legislative and judicial power emanate entirely from the Nation, and only the national-level executive power also emanates from the Nation.

Thus, at the departmental territorial level it can be said that the executive power is in the hands of a governor, elected by popular vote since 1992, who serves a term of 4 years since 2004. The governor appoints a cabinet made up of his secretaries.

As for the judicial branch, it is represented by the Judicial District Tribunals (of the ordinary and contentious-administrative jurisdictions), but this is not decentralization, as with territorial entities, but rather deconcentration of the Nation. Generally a judicial district coincides with the territory of a department, but there are exceptions. Since legislative power is unique, so is judicial power, but the latter is deconcentrated throughout the country, so these tribunals belong to the Nation and not to the department. The same confusion may arise with the judicial circuits and judicial municipalities, which likewise belong to the nation and do not depend on any municipality.

The departmental assemblies or their members are elected by popular vote for the same term as the governor. The Assembly has between 11 and 31 deputies according to the population of the department.

Two or more departments may join together in Administrative and Planning Regions (RAP).

Departments are subdivided into municipalities, whose administration is in the hands of a mayor and a municipal council elected by popular vote for the same term as the departmental officials. Some departments with a large number of municipalities have chosen to recognize the existence of provinces or subregions, which are groups of municipalities with cultural, geographic or historical affinities, where a more important urban center is located as the capital and from which local institutions operate with jurisdiction over the other municipalities. These groupings, however, lack legal recognition.

=== Bogotá ===
Decree 1421, which establishes the special regime for the Capital District of Bogotá, states that "in accordance with the provisions of article 322 of the political constitution, the city of Bogotá, capital of the Republic and of the department of Cundinamarca, is organized as a capital district".

According to the decree, "the administrative powers that the Constitution and the laws confer on the departments are understood to be granted to the Capital District, insofar as they are compatible with the latter's special regime. The provisions of the Assembly and of the Governorate of Cundinamarca do not apply in the territory of the District", which makes Bogotá a first-order territorial entity in Colombia.

The government and administration of Bogotá are in the hands of the Council and the Mayor.

Bogotá is in turn divided into localities, which are controlled by:

- The Local Administrative Boards.
- The mayors and other local authorities.

== List of current departments ==
Departments of Colombia
ID	Map	Department	Capital	Area (km^{2})	Pop. (Dec. 2022)	Density per km^{2}	Established as a department	Flag	Code
00		Capital District	Bogotá	1,587	8,906,342	4670.80	1861		DC
01		Amazonas	Leticia	109,665	82,068	0.7	1991		AM
02		Antioquia	Medellín	63,612	6,887,306	100.72	1886		AN
03		Arauca	Arauca	23,818	304,978	11.01	1991		AR
04		Atlántico	Barranquilla	3,388	2,804,025	748.38	1910		AT
05		Bolívar	Cartagena	25,978	2,236,603	79.69	1886		BL
06		Boyacá	Tunja	23,189	1,259,601	52.50	1824		BY
07		Caldas	Manizales	7,888	1,036,455	126.55	1905		CL
08		Caquetá	Florencia	88,965	419,275	4.52	1981		CQ
09		Casanare	Yopal	44,640	442,068	9.42	1991		CS
10		Cauca	Popayán	29,308	1,516,018	49.97	1824		CA
11		Cesar	Valledupar	22,905	1,341,697	52.42	1967		CE
12		Chocó	Quibdó	46,530	553,519	11.49	1947		CH
13		Córdoba	Montería	25,020	1,856,496	71.33	1951		CO
14		Cundinamarca	Bogotá	24,210	2,473,634	120.57	1819		CU
15		Guainía	Inírida	72,238	52,061	0.67	1991		GN
16		Guaviare	San José del Guaviare	53,460	90,357	1.55	1991		GV
17		Huila	Neiva	19,890	1,140,932	55.32	1910		HU
18		La Guajira	Riohacha	20,848	1,002,394	42.24	1965		LG
19		Magdalena	Santa Marta	23,188	1,463,427	57.86	1824		MA
20		Meta	Villavicencio	82,805	1,080,706	12.14	1959		ME
21		Nariño	Pasto	33,268	1,629,181	49.01	1910		NA
22		Norte de Santander	Cúcuta	21,658	1,651,278	68.87	1910		NS
23		Putumayo	Mocoa	24,885	369,064	13.99	1991		PU
24		Quindío	Armenia	1,845	569,569	292.63	1966		QD
25		Risaralda	Pereira	4,140	977,829	227.87	1966		RI
26		San Andrés y Providencia	San Andrés	52	65,228	1178.46	1991		SA
27		Santander	Bucaramanga	30,537	2,324,090	71.55	1886		ST
28		Sucre	Sincelejo	10,917	972,350	82.89	1966		SU
29		Tolima	Ibagué	23,562	1,346,935	56.45	1886		TO
30		Valle del Cauca	Cali	22,140	4,589,278	202.16	1910		VC
31		Vaupés	Mitú	54,135	48,932	0.75	1991		VA
32		Vichada	Puerto Carreño	100,242	115,778	1.08	1991		VD

== Territorial associative schemes ==
=== Administrative and Planning Regions (RAP) ===
Colombia is a unitary and decentralized republic. In accordance with article 306 of the current 1991 Constitution, two or more departments may constitute themselves as administrative and planning regions, with legal personality, autonomy and their own assets, in order to develop the territory economically and socially.

The following administrative and planning regions are currently constituted:

- RAP Caribe (created in 2017 and made up of the departments of Atlántico, Bolívar, Cesar, Córdoba, La Guajira, Magdalena and Sucre)
- RAP Eje Cafetero (created in 2018 and made up of Caldas, Quindío and Risaralda; Tolima joined in 2020)
- RAP (E) Central (created in 2015 and made up of Boyacá, Cundinamarca, Meta, Tolima and the Capital District; Huila joined in 2019)
- RAP Pacífico (created in 2016 and made up of Cauca, Chocó, Nariño and Valle del Cauca)
- RAP Amazonia (created in 2019 and made up of Amazonas, Caquetá, Guaviare, Guainía, Putumayo and Vaupés)
- RAP Gran Santander (created in 2021 and made up of Santander and Norte de Santander)
- RAP del Agua y la Montaña (created in 2021 and made up of Antioquia and Caldas)
- RAP Llanos (created in 2021 and made up of Arauca, Casanare and Vichada)

== Statistics ==
- Largest department: Amazonas in the south of the country, with 109,665 km².
- Smallest department: San Andrés and Providencia, with 52.5 km².
- Smallest department on the mainland: Quindío, with 1,845 km².
- Department with the most municipalities: Antioquia, with 125 municipalities.
- Entity with the fewest municipalities: San Andrés and Providencia, with 1 municipality.
- Average number of municipalities per department: 33.
- Most populous first-order entity: the Capital District with 7,968,065 inhabitants, followed by Antioquia with 6,994,792 inhabitants (2023 data).
- Least populous department: Guainía in the southeast of the country, with 52,627 inhabitants (2023).
- Departments with the lowest population density: Vichada (0.5 inhabitants/km²), Guainía (0.6 inhabitants/km²) and Amazonas (0.7 inhabitants/km²).
- Departments with the highest density: San Andrés and Providencia (1,410 inhabitants/km²), Atlántico (766 inhabitants/km²) and Cundinamarca (391 inhabitants/km²).
- Last first-order entity created: Guaviare in 1977.
- The only department whose capital is not its most populous municipality is Putumayo.

At the urban level, Cundinamarca has the highest population density. In addition, Antioquia, Risaralda and Bolívar have high densities in their urban areas, ranging from 11,366 to 10,571 inhabitants/km².

In rural areas, or "rest" (resto), the departments with the highest density are: San Andrés and Providencia with 476 inhabitants/km²; Risaralda with 52 inhabitants/km²; and Caldas with 41 inhabitants/km².

== See also ==
- Municipalities of Colombia
- ISO 3166-2:CO
- List of Colombian department governors
