= Development Program with a Territorial Focus =

Development Program with a Territorial Focus (PDET) Programas de Desarrollo con Enfoque Territorial
- Country: Colombia
- Established: 2017

Population
  - Total: 6.6 million
- Website: www.renovacionterritorio.gov.co/especiales/especial_PDET/

The Development Program with a Territorial Focus (Spanish: Programas de Desarrollo con Enfoque Territorial, PDET) are a management and planning instrument of the Colombian government whose objective is to promote economic, social and environmental development in the areas of the country most affected by the internal armed conflict. The program currently covers 36% of the country's territory and benefits almost 7 million people.

In addition, since the 2022 legislative elections, it has its own representation in the Chamber of Representatives of Colombia with 16 seats under the name "Circunscripciones Transitorias Especiales de Paz" (Special Transitory Peace Constituencies, CTREP).

The PDETs have driven political change in Colombia by encouraging the political and electoral participation of historically marginalized communities.

== Characteristics ==
The PDET Territories were created in 2017 as part of the peace agreement between the Santos government and the FARC-EP. Their development was entrusted to the Territorial Renewal Agency (Agencia de Renovación del Territorio, ART) for a period of 15 years.

The program is carried out according to three levels of collective participation: the Community Assembly, the Municipal Commission and the Subregional Commission.

== Objectives ==
The main objectives of the PDET are:

- To create channels of social oversight.
- To empower and transform communities.
- To stimulate the economy and strengthen food security.
- To contribute to reducing multidimensional rural poverty by 50%.
- To promote departmental and municipal development plans.

== Criticism ==
Some social and community organizations have called for greater participation, recognition and an environmental component in the PDET Territories.

== Territories ==
The program is implemented in 11,000 veredas in 170 municipalities within the 16 subregions defined by Decree-Law 893 of 2017.

PDET Territories
Subregion	Municipalities
Alto Patía and Northern Cauca	Colombia: Argelia, Balboa, Buenos Aires, Cajibío, Caldono, Caloto, Corinto, El Tambo, Jambaló, Mercaderes, Miranda, Morales, Patía, Piendamó, Santander de Quilichao, Suárez, Toribío; Colombia: Cumbitara, El Rosario, Leiva, Los Andes, Policarpa; Colombia: Florida, Pradera
Arauca	Colombia: Arauquita, Fortul, Saravena, Tame
Bajo Cauca and Northeastern Antioquia	Colombia: Amalfi, Anorí, Briceño, Cáceres, Caucasia, El Bagre, Ituango, Nechí, Remedios, Segovia, Tarazá, Valdivia, Zaragoza
Catatumbo	Colombia: Convención, El Carmen, El Tarra, Hacarí, San Calixto, Sardinata, Teorama, Tibú
Chocó	Colombia: Murindó, Vigía del Fuerte; Colombia: Acandí, Bojayá, Carmen del Darién, Condoto, Istmina, Litoral de San Juan, Medio Atrato, Medio San Juan, Nóvita, Nuevo Belén de Bajirá, Riosucio, Sipí, Unguía
Caguán River basin and Caquetá piedmont	Colombia: Albania, Belén de los Andaquíes, Cartagena del Chairá, Curillo, El Doncello, El Paujil, Florencia, La Montañita, Milán, Morelia, Puerto Rico, San José del Fragua, San Vicente del Caguán, Solano, Solita, Valparaíso; Colombia: Algeciras
Macarena – Guaviare	Colombia: Mapiripán, Mesetas, La Macarena, La Uribe, Puerto Concordia, Puerto Lleras, Puerto Rico, Vista Hermosa; Colombia: Calamar, El Retorno, Miraflores, San José del Guaviare
Montes de María	Colombia: Córdoba, El Carmen de Bolívar, El Guamo, María la Baja, San Jacinto, San Juan Nepomuceno, Zambrano; Colombia: Colosó, Chalán, Los Palmitos, Morroa, Ovejas, Palmito, San Onofre, Toluviejo
Pacific and Nariño border	Colombia: Barbacoas, El Charco, La Tola, Magüí, Mosquera, Olaya Herrera, Francisco Pizarro, Ricaurte, Roberto Payán, Santa Bárbara, Tumaco
Middle Pacific	Colombia: Guapi, López de Micay, Timbiquí; Colombia: Buenaventura
Putumayo	Colombia: Mocoa, Orito, Puerto Asís, Puerto Caicedo, Puerto Guzmán, Puerto Leguízamo, San Miguel, Valle del Guamuez, Villagarzón
San Jorge and Alto Sinú	Colombia: Montelíbano, Puerto Libertador, San José de Uré, Tierralta, Valencia
Sierra Nevada – Perijá	Colombia: Agustín Codazzi, Becerril, La Jagua de Ibirico, Manaure Balcón del Cesar, Pueblo Bello, La Paz, San Diego, Valledupar; Colombia: Dibulla, Fonseca, San Juan del Cesar; Colombia: Aracataca, Ciénaga, Fundación, Santa Marta
Southern Bolívar	Colombia: Yondó; Colombia: Arenal, Cantagallo, Morales, San Pablo, Santa Rosa del Sur, Simití
Southern Tolima	Colombia: Ataco, Chaparral, Planadas, Rioblanco
Urabá	Colombia: Apartadó, Carepa, Chigorodó, Dabeiba, Mutatá, Necoclí, San Pedro de Urabá, Turbo

=== New PDETs ===
- After Barrancominas in Guainía was elevated to the category of municipality, it was proposed that it be included in a PDET Subregion.
- The country's first Development Program with a Territorial Focus would bring together the Bogotá localities of Bosa, Ciudad Bolívar and Sumapaz and the municipality of Soacha.

== Peace Regions ==
Article 8B of Law 418 states: "The President of the Republic may establish peace regions, in which peace talks are carried out with his authorization. In their formation, priority will be given, in addition to the PDET territories of the Peace Agreement, to the municipalities categorized as ZOMAC, communities of influence or vulnerable areas where there are serious effects on the civilian population and the territory, and where the State is absent or weakly present."

This also aims at the urgent presence of the State in situations of public order. The High Commissioner for Peace will be tasked with designating local delegates to carry out certain specific actions under his direction.
