= Florencia, Caquetá =

Florencia
- Municipality and city
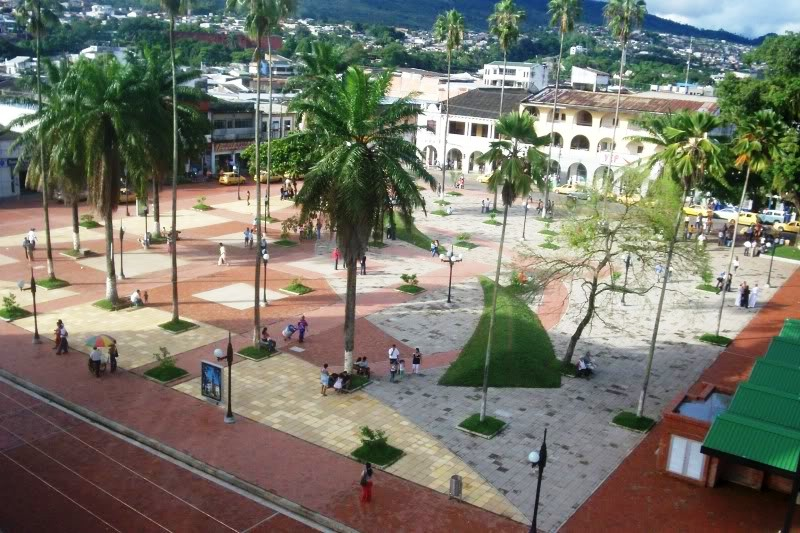
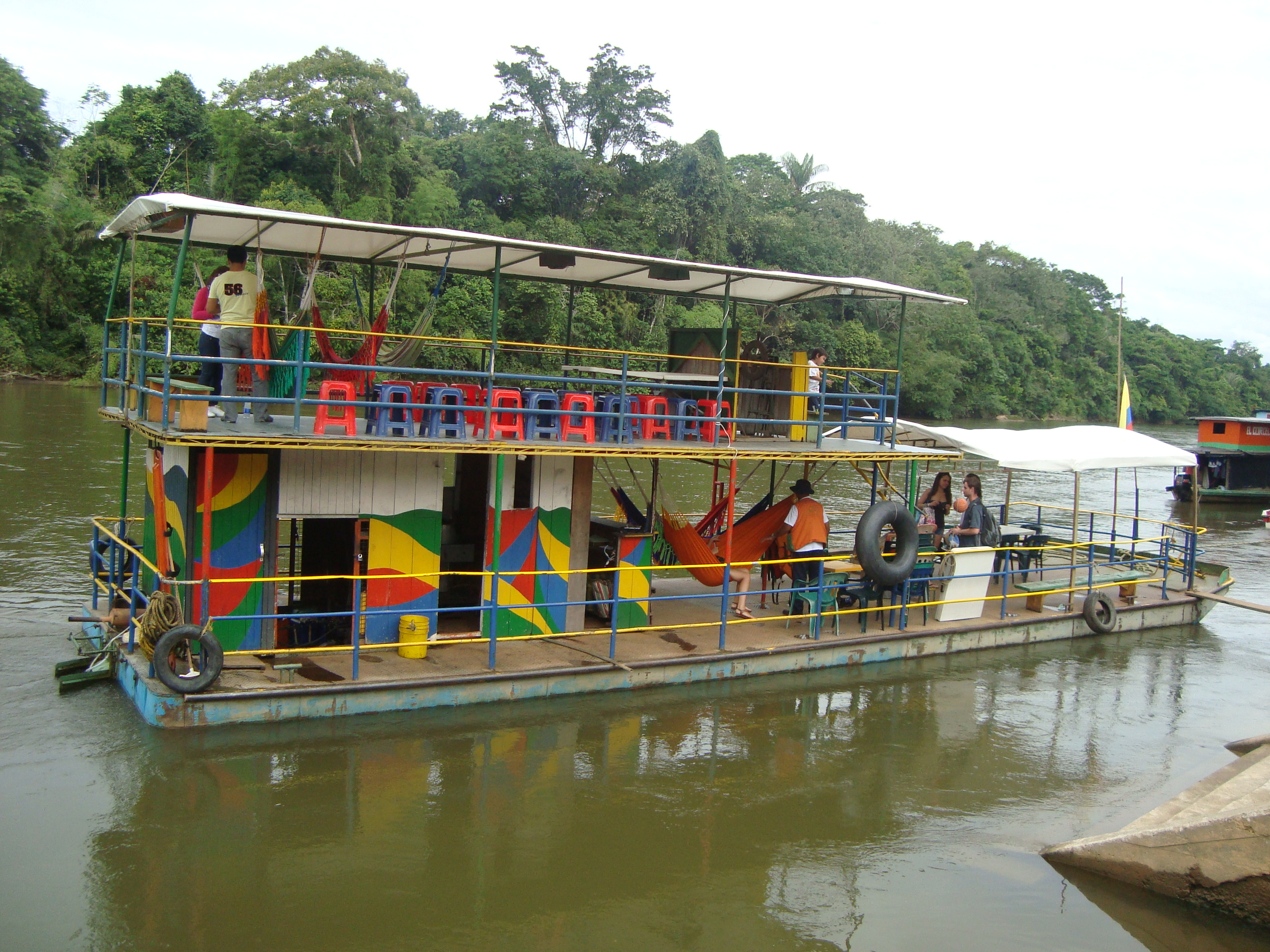
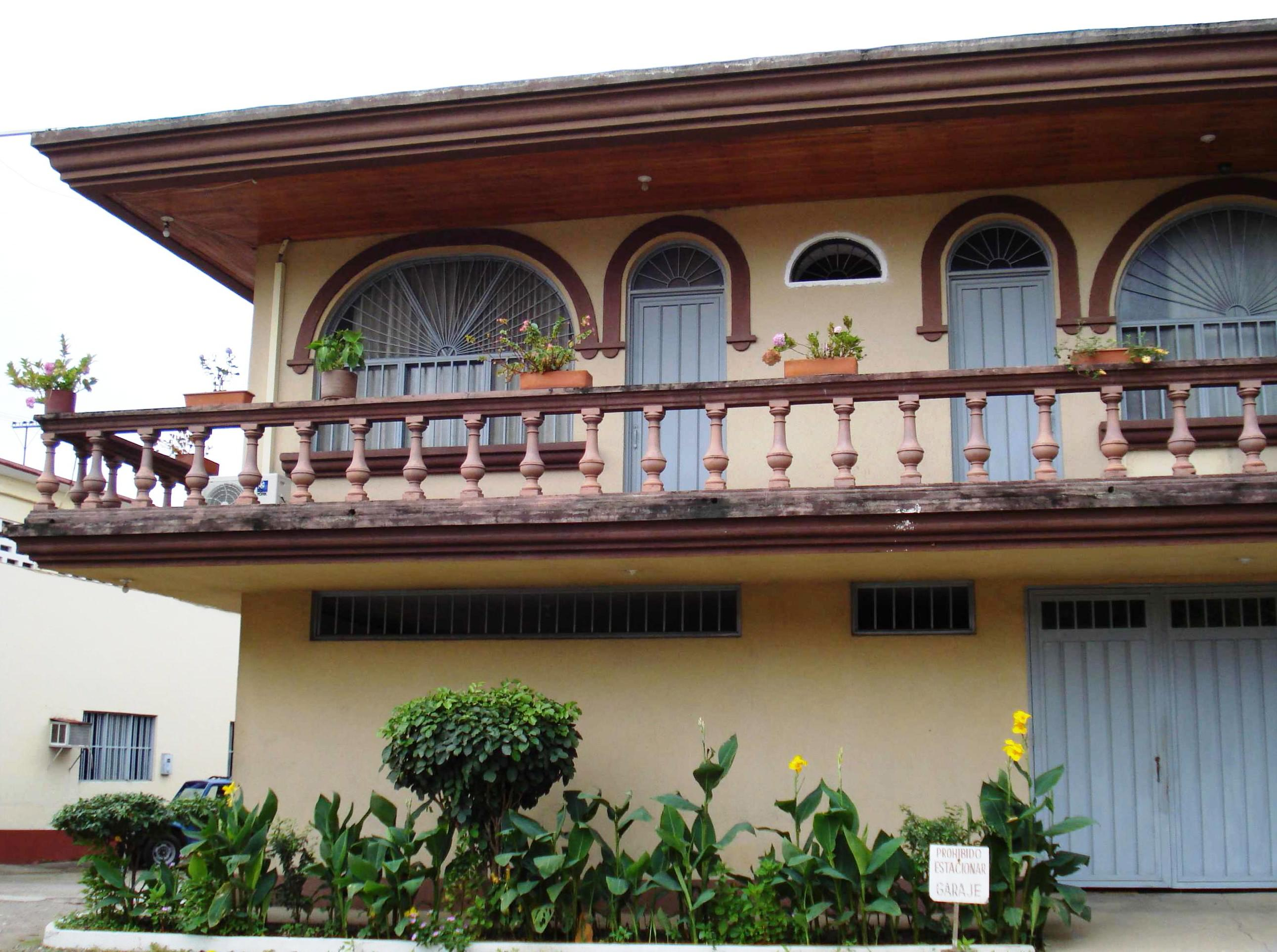
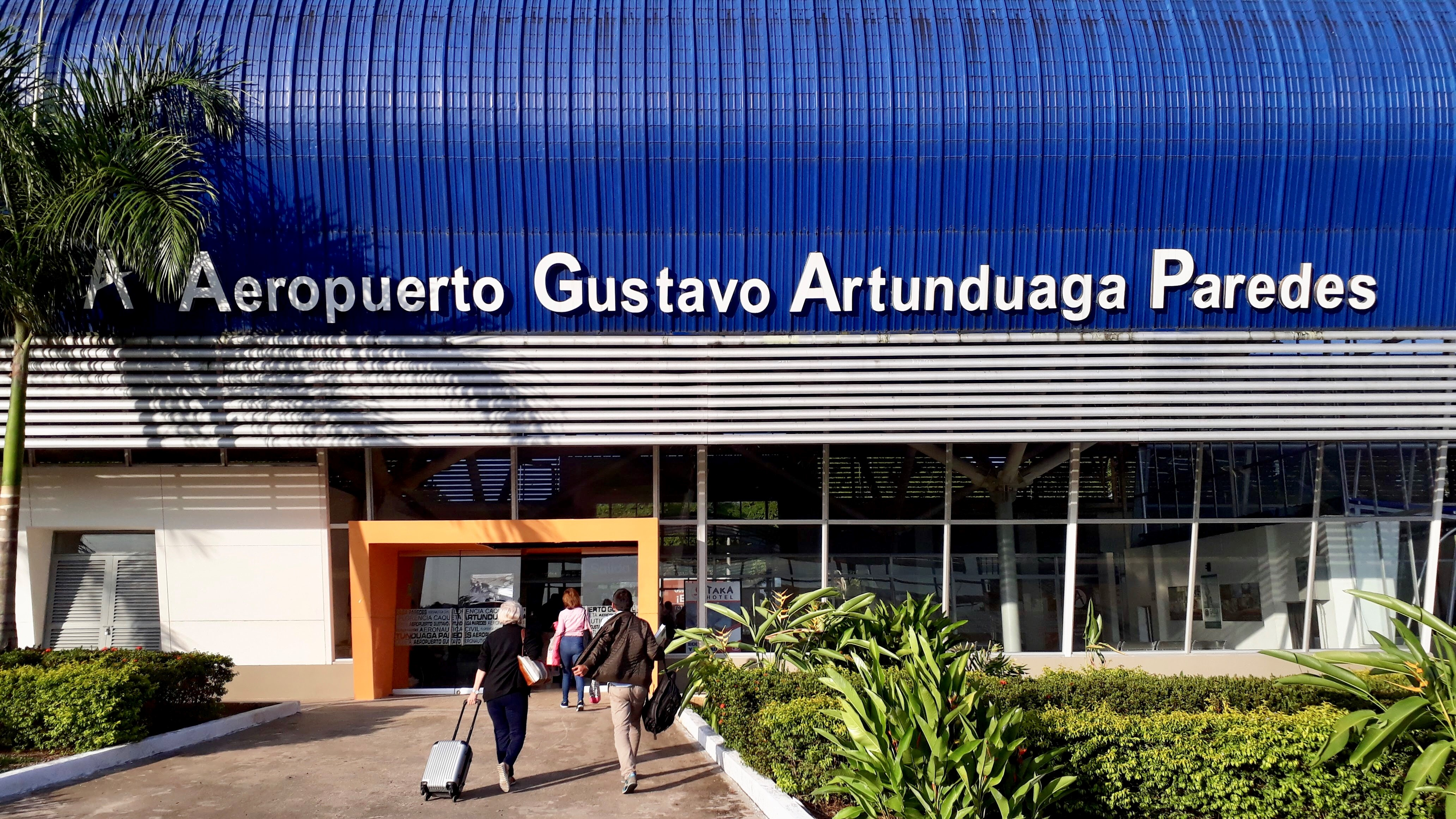
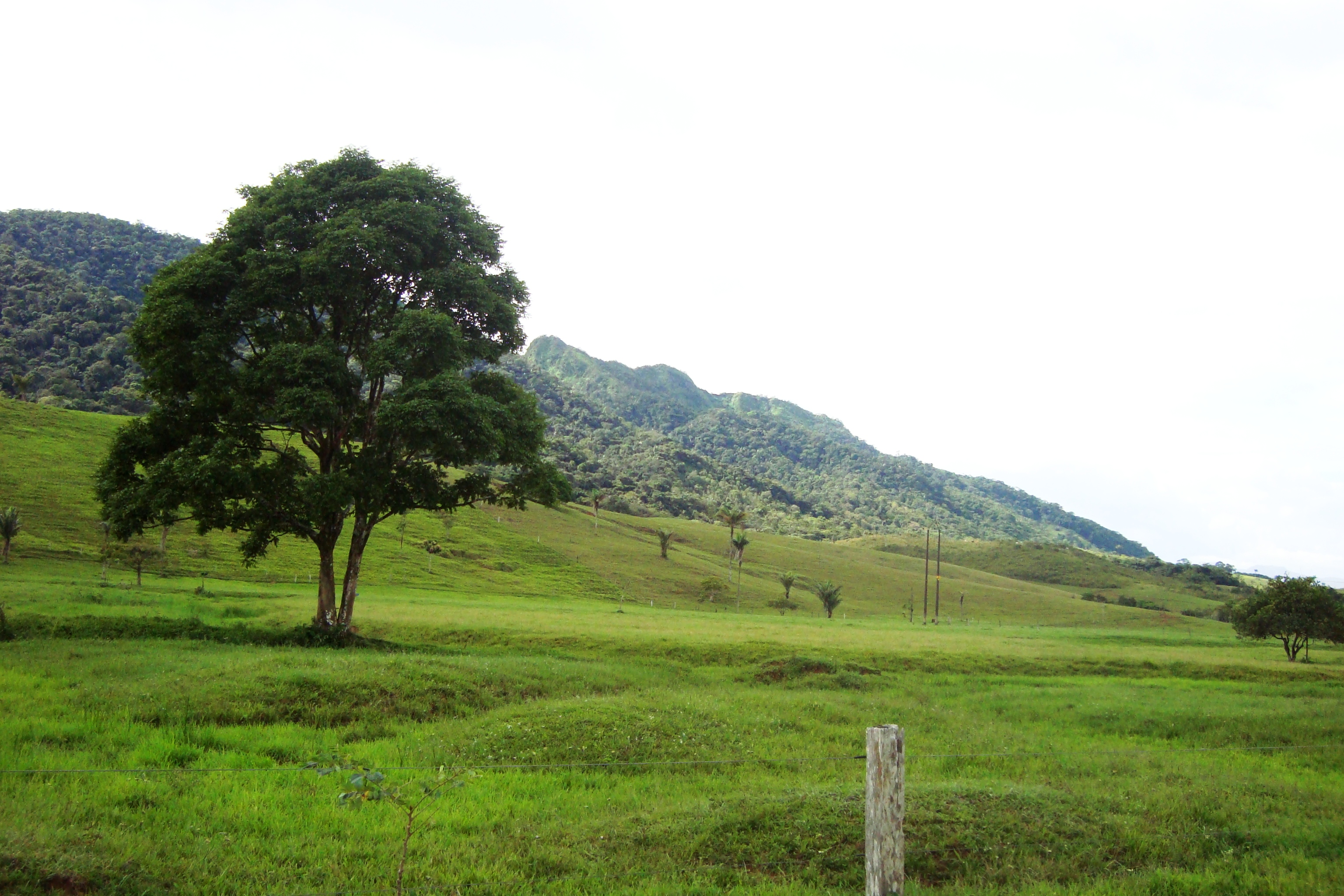
- Top: View of Plaza Pizarro, Second: A sightseeing boat at Biblioteca River, Third: House of the Episcopal Curia, Four: Gustavo Artunduaga Paredes Airport Bottom: Piedmont of Florencia

- Flag Coat of arms
- Nickname: Golden Gate to the Colombian Amazonia
- Location of the municipality and town of Florencia in the Caquetá Department of Colombia.

- Location in Colombia
- Coordinates: 1°36′50″N 75°36′46″W
- Country: Colombia
- Region: Amazonas Region
- Department: Caquetá Department
- Founded: 1902
- Incorporated: 1912
- Founder: Doroteo de Pupiales
- Named for: Florence

Government
  - Mayor: María Susana Portela

Area
  - Municipality and city: 2,548 km^{2} (984 sq mi)
  - Urban: 20.21 km^{2} (7.80 sq mi)
- Elevation: 242 m (794 ft)

Population (2023)
  - Municipality and city: 177,946
  - Rank: 35th in Colombia
  - Density: 69.84/km^{2} (180.9/sq mi)
- DANE
- Demonym(s): Florencian florenciano (m), -na (f) florentino (m), -na (f)

Ethnicity
  - White/Mestizo: 95.9%
  - Afro: 3.3%
  - Amerindian: 0.8%
- Time zone: UTC-05 (Colombia Standard Time)
- Postal code: 180001–180009
- Area code: 57 + 8
- Major airport: Gustavo Artunduaga Paredes Airport
- Website: Official website (in Spanish)

Florencia (Spanish pronunciation: [floˈɾensja], English: Florence) is a municipality and the capital city of the Department of Caquetá, Colombia. It is the most populous city in the Amazon Region of Colombia. It lies on the Hacha River and is located in the Orteguaza River basin. Its population was 177,946 in 2023.

== Etymology ==
The name of the city pays homage to an Italian businessman dedicated to the rubber trade, Paolo Ricci, from the city of Florence.

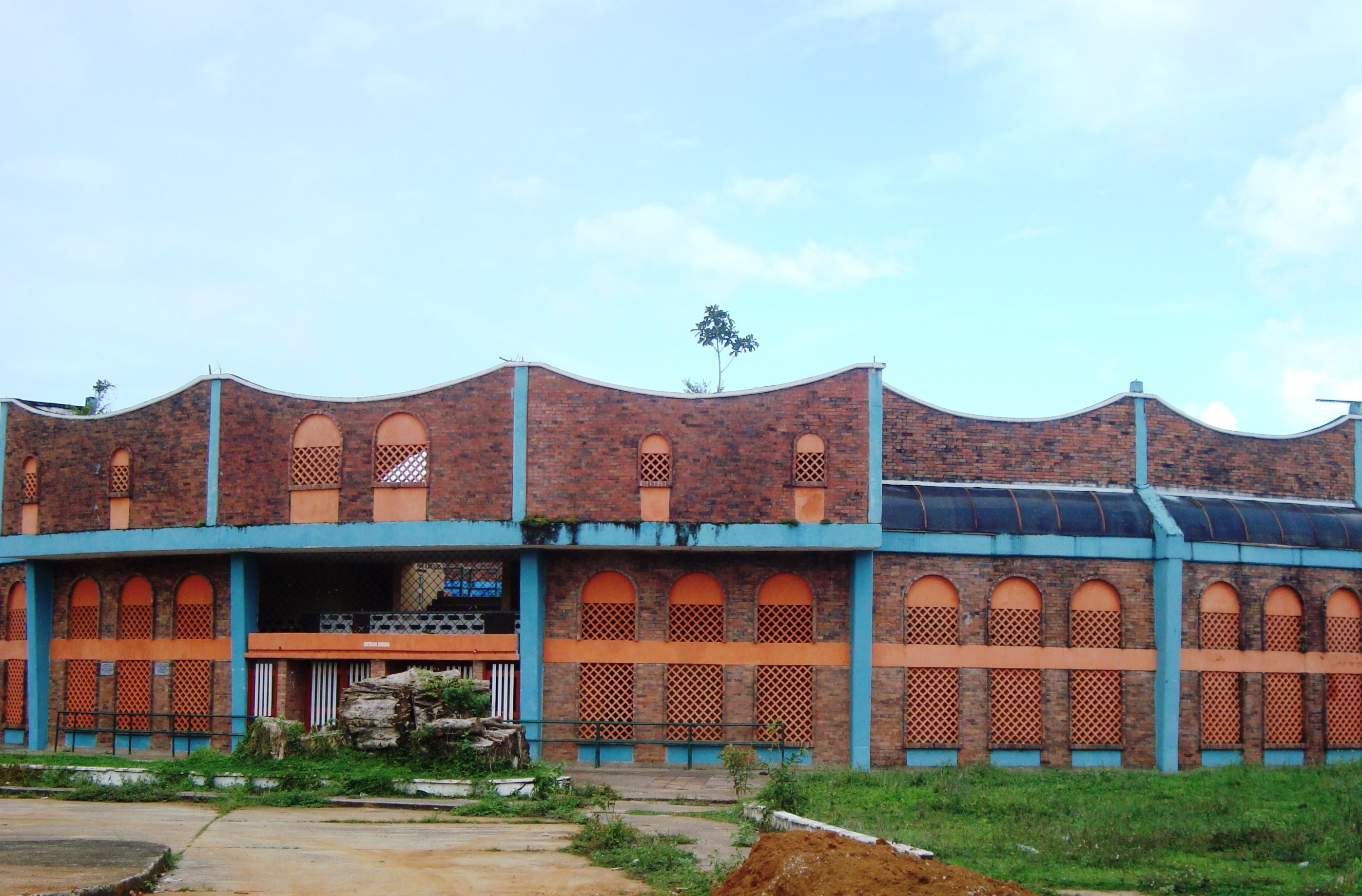
Santo Domingo bullring

== History ==
The area where Florencia is located was inhabited by tribes of the Andaquí ethnic group. The territory where the city is located was also inhabited by Witoto and Coreguaje tribes. In 1542, the territory was explored for the first time by the Spanish conquistador, Hernán Pérez de Quesada. Florencia was founded on December 25, 1902 by Capuchin Friar Doroteo De Pupiales (1876-1959) Born in Pupiales, Nariño, Colombia. Rubber plantations around several areas of what is now known as the department of Caqueta encouraged the creation of the city next to the Hacha River. The city became an important site after the creation of the trail between the settlement and the town of Guadalupe in what is now the department of Huila.

== Geography ==
Florencia is located at the foot of the Cordillera Oriental mountain range. The municipality of Florencia limits to the north with the Huila Department and the municipality of La Montañita, to the east with the municipalities of El Paujil and La Montañita, to the south with the municipalities of Milán and Morelia, and to the west with the municipality of Belén de Andaquies and the Huila Department.

== Climate ==
Florencia has a tropical rainforest climate (Köppen Af), and experiences significant rainfall during the course of the year. There is still a large amount of rainfall, even in the driest month. The average temperature in Florencia is 26.1 °C or 79.0 °F. In Florencia, January is the driest month, while June tends to be the wettest month. About 3,840 millimetres or 150 inches of rain falls annually during the year.

Climate data for Florencia (Gustavo Artunduaga Paredes Airport), elevation 244 m (801 ft), (1981–2010)
Month	Jan	Feb	Mar	Apr	May	Jun	Jul	Aug	Sep	Oct	Nov	Dec	Year
Mean daily maximum °C (°F)	32.6 (90.7)	32.0 (89.6)	31.0 (87.8)	30.2 (86.4)	29.8 (85.6)	28.9 (84.0)	28.8 (83.8)	30.0 (86.0)	30.9 (87.6)	31.2 (88.2)	31.3 (88.3)	32.0 (89.6)	30.7 (87.3)
Daily mean °C (°F)	26.9 (80.4)	26.6 (79.9)	26.2 (79.2)	25.7 (78.3)	25.5 (77.9)	24.8 (76.6)	24.6 (76.3)	25.2 (77.4)	25.7 (78.3)	26 (79)	26.2 (79.2)	26.5 (79.7)	25.8 (78.4)
Mean daily minimum °C (°F)	21.6 (70.9)	21.8 (71.2)	21.7 (71.1)	21.6 (70.9)	21.5 (70.7)	21.0 (69.8)	20.6 (69.1)	20.7 (69.3)	21.0 (69.8)	21.4 (70.5)	21.6 (70.9)	21.7 (71.1)	21.4 (70.5)
Average precipitation mm (inches)	103.7 (4.08)	191.6 (7.54)	294.4 (11.59)	442.2 (17.41)	514.2 (20.24)	494.5 (19.47)	426.2 (16.78)	322.7 (12.70)	312.8 (12.31)	275.7 (10.85)	243.6 (9.59)	136.9 (5.39)	3,758.6 (147.98)
Average precipitation days	12	15	21	24	27	26	25	23	20	21	20	15	247
Average relative humidity (%)	76	78	81	83	84	85	84	81	80	80	81	79	81
Mean monthly sunshine hours	176.7	124.2	108.5	105.0	105.4	96.0	102.3	127.1	144.0	148.8	147.0	173.6	1,558.6
Mean daily sunshine hours	5.7	4.4	3.5	3.5	3.4	3.2	3.3	4.1	4.8	4.8	4.9	5.6	4.3
Source: Instituto de Hidrologia Meteorologia y Estudios Ambientales

Climate data for Florencia (Macagual), elevation 280 m (920 ft), (1981–2010)
Month	Jan	Feb	Mar	Apr	May	Jun	Jul	Aug	Sep	Oct	Nov	Dec	Year
Mean daily maximum °C (°F)	32.2 (90.0)	31.7 (89.1)	30.6 (87.1)	30.0 (86.0)	29.6 (85.3)	28.7 (83.7)	28.6 (83.5)	29.7 (85.5)	30.8 (87.4)	31.0 (87.8)	30.9 (87.6)	31.7 (89.1)	30.4 (86.7)
Daily mean °C (°F)	26.0 (78.8)	25.8 (78.4)	25.4 (77.7)	25.0 (77.0)	24.8 (76.6)	24.2 (75.6)	23.8 (74.8)	24.4 (75.9)	24.9 (76.8)	25.2 (77.4)	25.4 (77.7)	25.7 (78.3)	25.0 (77.0)
Mean daily minimum °C (°F)	21.2 (70.2)	21.3 (70.3)	21.7 (71.1)	21.7 (71.1)	21.7 (71.1)	21.2 (70.2)	20.7 (69.3)	20.8 (69.4)	21.0 (69.8)	21.5 (70.7)	21.7 (71.1)	21.6 (70.9)	21.3 (70.3)
Average precipitation mm (inches)	106.3 (4.19)	193.2 (7.61)	307.1 (12.09)	442.8 (17.43)	478.7 (18.85)	449.8 (17.71)	416.3 (16.39)	300.9 (11.85)	274.6 (10.81)	298.4 (11.75)	243.2 (9.57)	136.0 (5.35)	3,592.8 (141.45)
Average precipitation days	12	15	21	23	26	25	24	22	19	20	18	14	234
Average relative humidity (%)	81	82	86	88	88	88	87	86	84	85	85	84	85
Mean monthly sunshine hours	170.5	124.2	102.3	99.0	108.5	99.0	108.5	133.3	144.0	148.8	147.0	170.5	1,555.6
Mean daily sunshine hours	5.5	4.4	3.3	3.3	3.5	3.3	3.5	4.3	4.8	4.8	4.9	5.5	4.3
Source: Instituto de Hidrologia Meteorologia y Estudios Ambientales

== Economy ==
According to a report of the first half of 2022 by the MinCIT, the main economic activities of the city were Trade and repair of vehicles with 22.6%, followed by Public Administration and Defense with 18.8% and third, Artistic Activities with 10.9%.

== Heritage Sites ==
- El Encanto Petroglyphs: These petroglyphs are located to the left of the Hacha River near Barrio Torasso. The engravings are approximately 16 meters long. They were first described by archaeologist Eliécer Silva Celis in 1963. Among the petroglyphs are Zoomorphic and Human figures.
- Curiplaya Building: A building of Neocolonial architecture built in 1945. This building served as a hotel, currently it houses some cultural entities of the municipality and the department. In addition it is the headquarters of the Palace of Culture and Fine Arts of the Amazon (Spanish: Palacio de la Cultura y Bellas Artes de la Amazonía). The building was declared a national cultural property in 2000 by the Colombian Ministry of Culture. The name "Curiplaya" means "Golden Beach" in the Witoto language.

== See also ==
- Our Lady of Lourdes Cathedral, Florencia
- Gustavo Artunduaga Paredes Airport
