= El Doncello =

Coordinates: 1°41′N 75°17′W

- Municipality and town
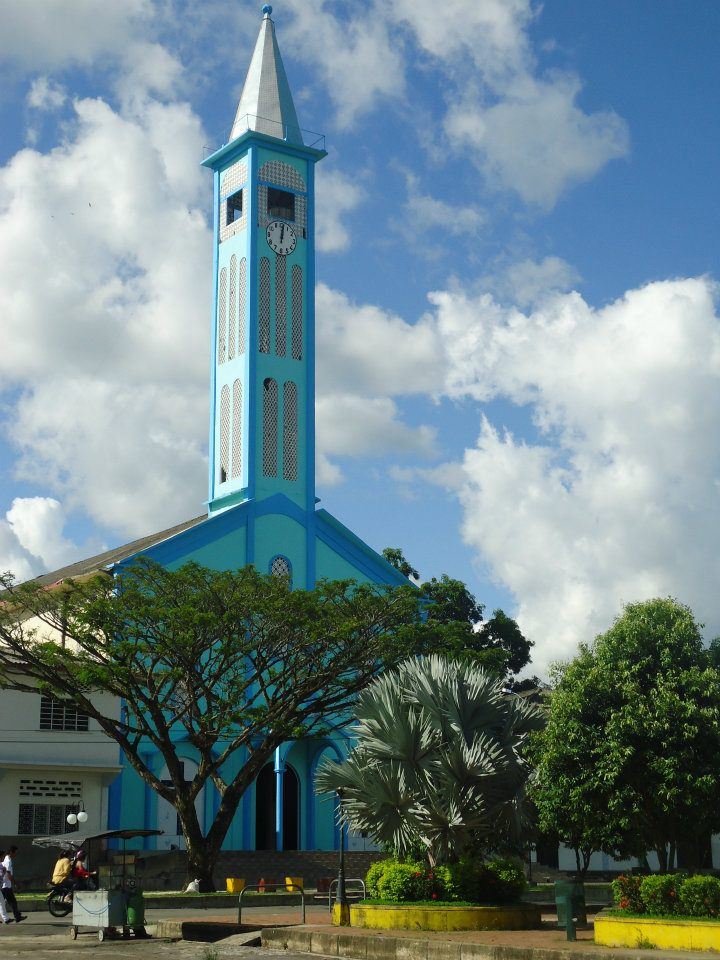

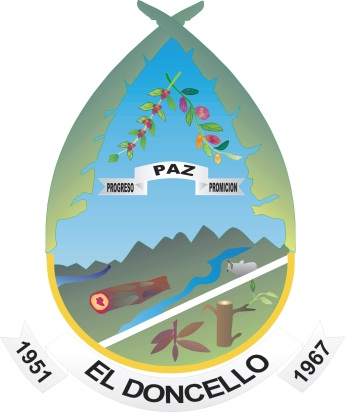
- Flag Seal

- Location of the municipality and town of El Doncello in the Caquetá Department of Colombia.
- Country: Colombia
- Department: Caquetá Department

Population (Census 2018)
  - Total: 17,775
- Time zone: UTC-5 (Colombia Standard Time)

San Juan de El Doncello or simply El Doncello is a municipality of Colombia in the department of Caquetá Department, Colombia. Planted on the foothills of the Eastern Cordillera, it is located northeast of Florencia, capital of the department. It is the first rubber producing municipality at the national level; there are more than 200 hectares cultivated in the Maguaré and Puerto Manrique Inspectorate. It is the commercial capital of Caquetá due to its frequent economic traffic, since its fertile lands are manipulated by farmers and agricultural personnel, who know how to make the most of it.

== History ==
This population has an attraction from the suggestive name that carries: El Doncello, but it is not only its name, but its small history rooted in the same jungle, as there was produced as a simple embryo, the natural union of a settler and a Huitoto Indian, Jorge Abel Molina a settler joined with Maria a Huitoto and between the two built their house and their chagra. The effort of this couple, managed to interest other settlers who in a short time not only made their homes but also built another house, the school.

The founders of El Doncello, besides Molina, were: Daniel Claros, Ricardo España, Jesús Collazos, Rufino Quichoya, Calixto Morales and Carlos Polanco. Also, little by little other hamlets emerged, supported by the strength of El Doncello, thus seeing Rio Negro, Puerto Manrique and Maguaré flourish. The latter population was initiated by the Caja Agraria, which in 1950, favored a Colonization. The municipality is bathed by the waters of the Doncello and Anayá rivers, and the Granada, Anayacito, Quebradón, San José and Nemal streams. In the east of the municipality is the Rio Negro Lagoon, a beautiful site visited by tourists from the interior of the country.

The colonization of Northern Caqueteño demanded the foundation of an intermediate town between Florencia and Puerto Rico that would provide rest and supplies. The most suitable lands were those of Jorge Abel Molina and Rufino Quichoya.

After analyzing the multiple possibilities, on March 20, 1951, during an overnight stay at the home of Jorge Abel Molina, Jesús González and Juan Vicente Aguirre Ortiz, and in response to the latter's proposal, it was decided to build the hamlet; for this Jorge Abel Molina donated a lot for the plaza and another for the school.

The first organizing board was formed as follows:

- President: Mariano García
- Vice President: Rufino Quichoya
- Treasurer: Jorge Abel Molina
- Fiscal: Custodio Gómez
- Secretary: Ricardo García

The Consolata Missionary Juan Demichelis was a pioneer in the municipality. Juan Bautista Migani fulfilled the promise to baptize the town and to get the first teacher (Eva Cedeño de Orozco and Margarita Arboleda de Hoyos), events that took place on July 14, 1951, and February 1952 respectively. The first School-Church functioned in a small kiosk in front of the Casa Cural, today the Founders Park. This town was named San Juan, after its patron saint (San Juan Bautista) and El Doncello after the tree thus named.

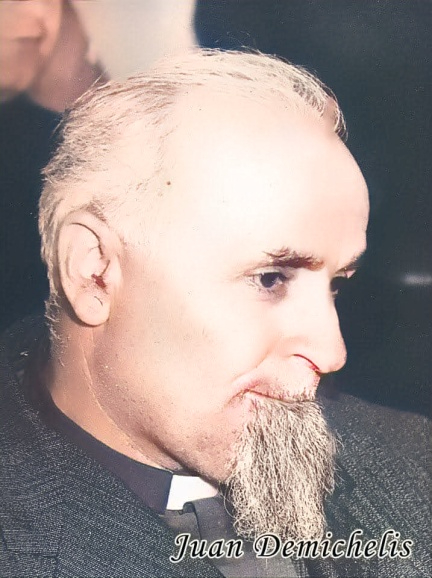
Father Juan Demichelis.

On April 12, 1952, by Decree No 19 was created the Police Inspectorate under Puerto Rico with Marco Fidel Bautista as inspector, Lubín Urueña as secretary. It was elevated to Corregimiento by Decree No. 100 of October 9, 1956 by Intendant Daniel Díaz and approved by National Resolution No. 395 of October 23, 1956; its first corregidor was Mr. Aníbal Muñoz and the last one was Eduardo Márquez. Around 1959, an area of El Doncello (Maguaré) was accepted as a colonization center of the Caja Agraria, which expanded the agricultural frontier with more than 25,000 hectares with about 3,000 settlers from different regions of the country.

Given the Caja's manifest inexperience with the management of these programs and the control of credits, land and its exploitation, in 1961 the project was handed over to Incora, created for this purpose. The road reached El Doncello in 1959 and the telegraph in 1960, year in which the road to Maguaré was started by Mr. Jorge Córdoba. In the same year the first Jorge Abel Molina Boys' School was built and two years later the Immaculate Heart of Mary School for girls was born, which in 1966 opened the secondary cycle. In February 1967, during his visit to this town, the then Minister of Government Misael Pastrana Borrero promised to build a neighborhood, which became effective in 1968 with the construction of 20 houses through the Caja Agraria, the neighborhood was called El Jardín.

The accelerated development of the population in the township of El Doncello was accompanied by the opening of roads, schools, health posts; the expansion of transportation and other public services, until its residents and leaders considered that the time had come to give the Doncello the opportunity to make it a more important administrative cell and on October 12, 1967, by Decree No. 1678 of September 7, 1967, signed by Mayor Octavio Macias Ramirez and Secretary of Government Juan Puyo Falla this territory was promoted to the category of Municipality. No. 1678 of September 7, 1967, signed by the Mayor Octavio Macías Ramírez and the Secretary of Government Juan Puyo Falla this territory was promoted to the category of Municipality being its first Mayor Mr. José Ignacio Rojas; rewarding with this the tenacity and the enterprising spirit of the population.

The electric energy of the National System was installed in 1986, thanks to the work of the Association of Merchants and Industrialists of El Doncello, headed by Luis Alberto González Ovalle, Gentil Papamija, Saúl Hurtado, Ramón Hurtado and Jesús Ordóñez, among others, who also promoted, together with Captain Guillermo Espitia, the creation of the Volunteer Fire Department. The National Direct Dial telephony arrived in 1992, previously it worked through two telephone lines that were distributed among the inhabitants through a switchboard located in Telecom.

(Most of the information was acquired thanks to Parroquia San Juan Bautista, with the help of the priests: Carlos Hernán Cubillos, Jorge Hugo Poveda Vega, José Sair Álvarez Ortíz, Freddy Galindo Ramírez and Misael Hernández España).

== Geography ==
The municipality of El Doncello is made up of a fairly large number of Veredas, it is located in the foothills of the eastern slope of the mountain range of the same name, with a topography shared between the foothills of the mountain range and the plains. Its urban center is located at 480 meters above sea level with a temperature of 26 °C.

Its soils have characteristics of the Amazonian highlands, foothills of the Eastern Cordillera and the piedmont, where the municipality is located, they are acidic and of low fertility.

Like all the municipalities of the Amazon piedmont with colonization area, it is a victim of indiscriminate forest clearing and logging, a problem that together with the production of illicit crops affect the current situation of the municipality.

The inadequate exploitation of soil resources, oriented almost exclusively to extensive cattle ranching in the Amazonian highlands and the low levels of productivity in agricultural exploitation in the foothills of the mountain range, deprive the municipality of El Doncello, as is the case in the other municipalities of Caquetá, of a solid economic base that allows for a true complementarity between the countryside and urban areas.

In addition, as a consequence of the generalized livestock model as the main base of economic activity, manufacturing activity is precarious; the spontaneous growth of the urban population without appropriate infrastructure conditions means that most of the activities in the urban area are subnormal and of a provisional nature.

- Florencia 69 km
- Albania 145 km
- Belén de los Andaquies 115 km
- Cartagena del Chairá 82 km
- Curillo 164 km
- El Paujil 14 km
- La Montañita 37km
- Milán 85 km
- Morelia 93 km
- Puerto Rico 35 km
- San Vicente del Caguán 93 km
- San José del Fragua 133 km
- Solano
- Solita 107 km
- Valparaíso 48 km

Fluviales:
No dispone

== Climate ==
Climate data for El Doncello (Maguare), elevation 270 m (890 ft), (1981–2010)
Month	Jan	Feb	Mar	Apr	May	Jun	Jul	Aug	Sep	Oct	Nov	Dec	Year
Mean daily maximum °C (°F)	32.7 (90.9)	32.3 (90.1)	31.2 (88.2)	30.5 (86.9)	29.8 (85.6)	28.9 (84.0)	28.7 (83.7)	29.9 (85.8)	30.8 (87.4)	31.0 (87.8)	30.8 (87.4)	31.8 (89.2)	30.7 (87.3)
Daily mean °C (°F)	26.8 (80.2)	26.5 (79.7)	25.9 (78.6)	25.4 (77.7)	25.1 (77.2)	24.4 (75.9)	24.2 (75.6)	24.8 (76.6)	25.4 (77.7)	25.6 (78.1)	25.8 (78.4)	26.2 (79.2)	25.5 (77.9)
Mean daily minimum °C (°F)	20.8 (69.4)	21.2 (70.2)	21.5 (70.7)	21.6 (70.9)	21.5 (70.7)	20.8 (69.4)	20.3 (68.5)	20.4 (68.7)	20.7 (69.3)	21.1 (70.0)	21.4 (70.5)	21.0 (69.8)	21.0 (69.8)
Average precipitation mm (inches)	76.4 (3.01)	144.1 (5.67)	292.2 (11.50)	417.2 (16.43)	370.9 (14.60)	348.3 (13.71)	303.5 (11.95)	210.5 (8.29)	234.8 (9.24)	286.8 (11.29)	213.5 (8.41)	95.4 (3.76)	2,942.3 (115.84)
Average precipitation days	8	12	18	23	24	24	22	20	19	19	17	10	209
Average relative humidity (%)	75	78	83	86	86	87	86	84	83	83	83	80	83
Mean monthly sunshine hours	186.0	132.7	102.3	96.0	105.4	93.0	102.3	130.2	147.0	148.8	150.0	182.9	1,576.6
Mean daily sunshine hours	6.0	4.7	3.3	3.2	3.4	3.1	3.3	4.2	4.9	4.8	5.0	5.9	4.3
Source: Instituto de Hidrologia Meteorologia y Estudios Ambientales

== Culture ==
=== Festivities ===
- Folkloric Festival of Caquetá.
- San Pedrinas Festivities.
- Departmental Rubber Festival.
- Commercial and cattle fair.
- Old Year's Parade.
- Fairs and Festivals.
- Religious events:
- Holy Week.
