= Gustavo Artunduaga Paredes Airport =

Gustavo Artunduaga Paredes Airport Aeropuerto Nacional Gustavo Artunduaga Paredes
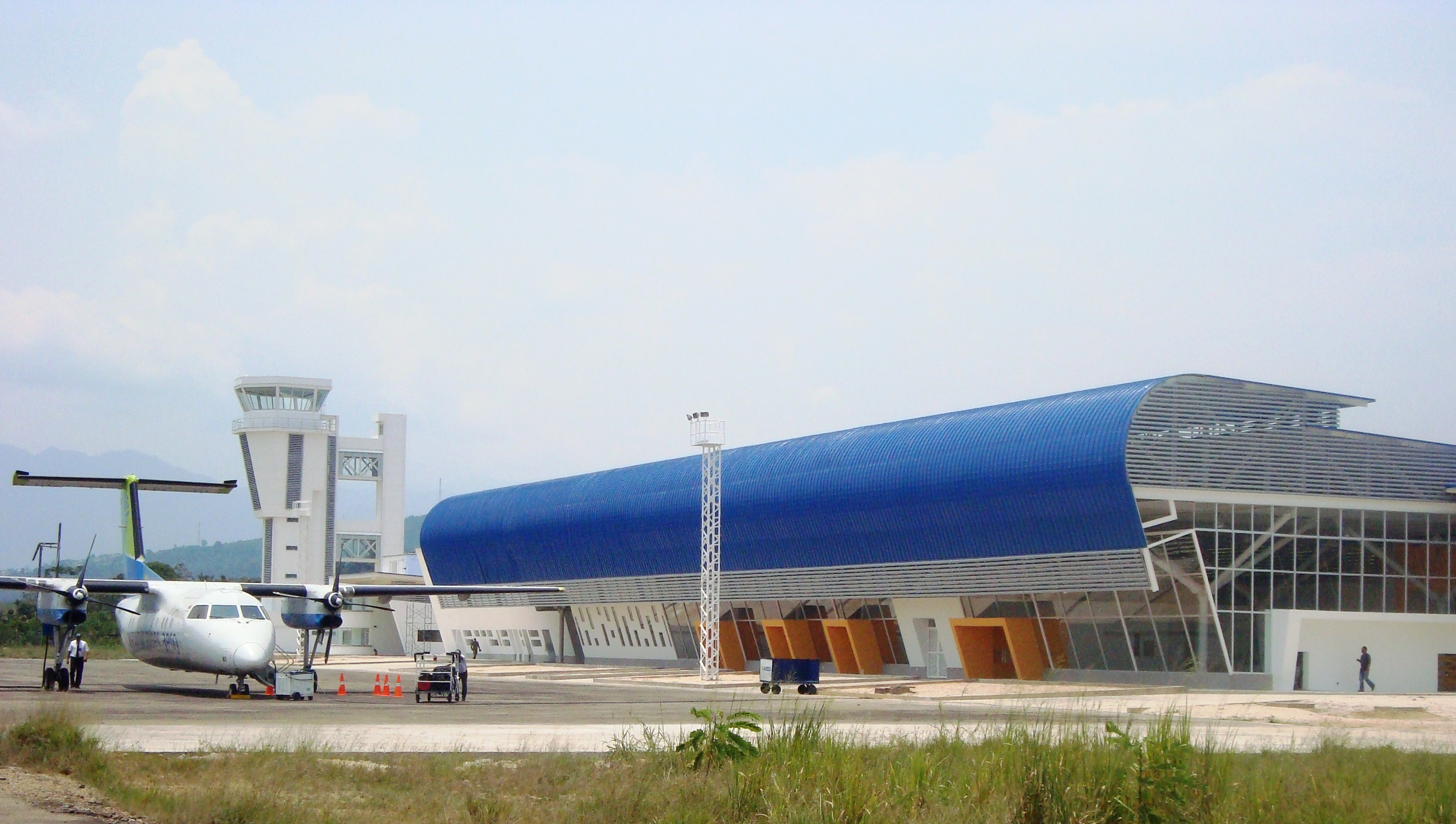
- IATA: FLA; ICAO: SKFL

Summary
- Airport type: Public
- Owner: Aerocivil
- Location: Florencia, Colombia
- Elevation AMSL: 807 ft (246 m)
- Coordinates: 1°35′20″N 75°33′50″W

Map
- Location of airport in Colombia

Runways
Direction	Length		Surface
Direction	m	ft	Surface
12/30	1,500	4,921	Asphalt

Statistics (2018)
- Passengers movement: 112.545
- Cargo movement: 801 T
- Air operations: 6694
- Sources: WAD Aerocivil

Gustavo Artunduaga Paredes Airport (Spanish: Aeropuerto Gustavo Artunduaga Paredes) (IATA: FLA, ICAO: SKFL) is a regional airport serving Florencia, the capital of the Caquetá Department of Colombia. It is the most important airport in Caquetá, with scheduled commercial cargo and passenger operations carried out through airlines such as Avianca and the state-owned Satena, as well as military, police and general aviation flights.

== Access ==
The airport is between the villages of San Martin and Venice, in a place known colloquially as Capitolio on the road connecting the city of Florence with the municipality of La Montañita. To get there, taxi service from the city limits of the city is available as well as several bus routes that connect with the southeastern suburbs and downtown Florence. Additionally, some hotels offer transfer services airport-hotel-airport on request.

== Description ==
=== Land side facilities ===
The passenger terminal has all the necessary infrastructure for passenger service, including check-in capacity for several airlines, nine stores, two restaurants, two departure lounges with capacity for 228 passengers, landing room with their respective luggage belts, six bathrooms, X-ray scanner, metal detectors, air conditioning, speakers, cargo hold, chapel, administrative offices and facilities for law enforcement, health services with permanent ambulance and car parking.

=== Air side facilities ===
The airport has an asphalt runway of 1500 m - 4921 ft - long with 12/30 direction, a platform of 3000 m^{2} with parking for six positions for general aviation, four commercial passenger aviation positions and four helicopters positions and three taxiways - alpha, bravo and charlie - that connect the platform to the southern section of the track. The control tower is 27 feet high, divided into nine levels. It is also equipped with a fire department of three levels provided with two machines for emergency care. 5 It also has infrastructure for fueling Jet A-1 and to serve nocturnal air navigation until 20:00 (UTC−5).

== Airlines and destinations ==
Airlines	Destinations
SATENA	Araracuara, Bogotá, Cali, Puerto Leguízamo

== Accidents and incidents ==
- On 2 April 1976, Douglas DC-3 FAC-676 of SATENA crashed on approach. The aircraft was on a flight from Tres de Mayo Airport, Puerto Asís. Five of the 16 people on board were killed.
- On 20 April 1993, Douglas C-47A CP-1622 of Trans Aéreos Cochabamba was damaged beyond repair in an accident at the airport. The port engine failed and both crew were killed in the accident.

== See also ==
- Transport in Colombia
- List of airports in Colombia
