= Bodoquero River =

River in Caquetá, Colombia

Bodoquero River Rio Boboquero
- Native name: Spanish: El río Bodoquero

Location
- Country: Colombia
- Department: Caquetá

Physical characteristics
- Source
  - coordinates: 1°16′27″N 75°31′28″W
- Length: 100 km (62 mi)

Basin features
- Progression: Cordillera Oriental range → Bodoquero → Orteguaza → others
- River system: Amazon River basin
- Köppen climate type: Af : Tropical rainforest climate

The Bodoquero River (Spanish: El río Bodoquero) is one of the most important rivers in the Colombian municipality of Florencia, Colombia in the department of Caquetá. It serves as a natural boundary between the municipalities of Florencia and Morelia and is part of the Amazon River basin.

== Geography ==
The Bodoquero River rises in the Eastern Cordillera mountain range (also known as the "Colombian Andes") southwest of the municipal seat of Florencia. Its waters meander through the territory in a north–south-easterly direction, finally flowing into the Orteguaza River, near the municipality of Milan. Rivers in this region are often accompanied by the presence of shifting Oxbow lakes.

== Hydrology ==
River bank material was laid down in the Quaternary period, comprising mainly alluvial deposits and alluvial plains
