= Valparaíso Municipality =

Valparaíso Municipality may refer to:

- Valparaíso, Antioquia, Colombia
- Valparaíso, Caquetá, Colombia
