= Solita =

Solita may refer to:

- Solita, Caquetá, a town and municipality in Caquetá Department, Colombia
- "Solita" (Prince Royce song), 2015
- "Solita" (Kali Uchis song), 2019
- "Solita", a song by PrettyMuch, 2018
- "Solita", a 2020 song by Fede Vigevani
