= Barbacoas, Nariño =

Barbacoas
- Municipality and town
- Flag Coat of arms

- Location of Barbacoas in Nariño, Colombia
- Coordinates: 01°40′18″N 078°08′23″W
- Country: Colombia
- Department: Nariño Department
- Subregion: Telembí Subregion
- Founded: 6 April 1600
- Founder: Francisco de Praga y Zuniga

Government
  - Mayor: Mario Alexander Hurtado (2024-2028)

Area
  - Municipality and town: 2,324 km^{2} (897 sq mi)
  - Urban: 4 km^{2} (1.5 sq mi)
- Elevation: 36 m (118 ft)

Population (2016)
  - Municipality and town: 38,708
  - Density: 16.66/km^{2} (43.14/sq mi)
  - Urban: 16,588
- Time zone: UTC-5 (Colombia Standard Time)
- Website: Official website

Telembí river (soundscape)

Barbacoas is a town and municipality in Nariño Department, Colombia. The urban centre of Barbacoas is located at an altitude of 36 metres (118 ft) and the municipality borders Magüí Payán in the north, Magüí Payán, Cumbitara, Los Andes, La Llanada, Samaniego and Ricaurte in the east, Ricaurte and Ecuador in the south and Tumaco and Roberto Payán in the west.

== History ==
In the times before the Spanish conquest, Barbacoas was inhabited by the Barbacoa, Telembí and Iscuande tribes. Already in those ages, the town was an important source of gold for the indigenous people.

Modern Barbacoas was founded on April 6, 1600, by Francisco de Praga y Zuniga.

== Economy ==
Barbacoas is an important mining town in Nariño, producing gold, silver, platinum and coal. Other economical activity is agriculture, with rice, avocadoes, plantains, sugarcane and fruits as bananas and citrus fruits. Other fruits cultivated are ciruelo, guayaba, papaya, pineapples, guanábana, borojó, guayabilla, lulo, anón, guaba, maracuyá, guayaba brasilera, zapallo, coconut, cacao and other agricultural products as arracacha, camote, ñame, achiote, chillangua, tomatoes, peppers, palmito, chillarán, and oregano.

== Strike ==
The town is infamous for its 2011 "crossed legs" strike, where women in the town foreswore sexual activity pending action on the promised paved road to their town.

== Climate ==
Barbacoas has a tropical rainforest climate (Köppen Af) with very heavy rainfall year-round.

Climate data for Barbacoas, elevation 60 m (200 ft), (1981–2010)
Month	Jan	Feb	Mar	Apr	May	Jun	Jul	Aug	Sep	Oct	Nov	Dec	Year
Mean daily maximum °C (°F)	30.2 (86.4)	30.5 (86.9)	30.8 (87.4)	30.9 (87.6)	30.3 (86.5)	29.9 (85.8)	29.9 (85.8)	29.8 (85.6)	29.7 (85.5)	29.6 (85.3)	29.5 (85.1)	29.7 (85.5)	30.1 (86.2)
Daily mean °C (°F)	25.9 (78.6)	26.1 (79.0)	26.2 (79.2)	26.2 (79.2)	26.1 (79.0)	26.0 (78.8)	25.9 (78.6)	25.9 (78.6)	25.8 (78.4)	25.7 (78.3)	25.7 (78.3)	25.7 (78.3)	25.9 (78.6)
Mean daily minimum °C (°F)	22.0 (71.6)	22.1 (71.8)	22.2 (72.0)	22.1 (71.8)	22.1 (71.8)	21.8 (71.2)	21.9 (71.4)	21.9 (71.4)	22.0 (71.6)	21.9 (71.4)	22.0 (71.6)	22.0 (71.6)	22.0 (71.6)
Average precipitation mm (inches)	557.3 (21.94)	524.3 (20.64)	606.9 (23.89)	818.8 (32.24)	853.7 (33.61)	658.1 (25.91)	501.4 (19.74)	394.5 (15.53)	488.4 (19.23)	521.4 (20.53)	411.4 (16.20)	524.3 (20.64)	6,860.5 (270.10)
Average precipitation days	27	23	25	26	28	27	25	24	26	26	23	26	303
Average relative humidity (%)	90	89	89	90	90	90	91	90	90	91	90	90	90
Mean monthly sunshine hours	93.0	90.3	102.3	117.0	105.4	93.0	102.3	89.9	63.0	71.3	72.0	80.6	1,080.1
Mean daily sunshine hours	3.0	3.2	3.3	3.9	3.4	3.1	3.3	2.9	2.1	2.3	2.4	2.6	3.0
Source: Instituto de Hidrologia Meteorologia y Estudios Ambientales

Climate data for Barbacoas (Altaquer), elevation 1,010 m (3,310 ft), (1981–2010)
Month	Jan	Feb	Mar	Apr	May	Jun	Jul	Aug	Sep	Oct	Nov	Dec	Year
Mean daily maximum °C (°F)	23.5 (74.3)	23.9 (75.0)	24.2 (75.6)	24.3 (75.7)	24.0 (75.2)	23.7 (74.7)	23.8 (74.8)	23.9 (75.0)	23.7 (74.7)	23.6 (74.5)	23.5 (74.3)	23.4 (74.1)	23.8 (74.8)
Daily mean °C (°F)	20.4 (68.7)	20.6 (69.1)	20.8 (69.4)	20.9 (69.6)	20.8 (69.4)	20.5 (68.9)	20.4 (68.7)	20.4 (68.7)	20.3 (68.5)	20.3 (68.5)	20.2 (68.4)	20.2 (68.4)	20.5 (68.9)
Mean daily minimum °C (°F)	17.8 (64.0)	18.1 (64.6)	18.2 (64.8)	18.2 (64.8)	18.3 (64.9)	18.0 (64.4)	17.9 (64.2)	17.9 (64.2)	17.9 (64.2)	18 (64)	17.9 (64.2)	18 (64)	18 (64)
Average precipitation mm (inches)	413.0 (16.26)	300.1 (11.81)	393.4 (15.49)	455.7 (17.94)	417.1 (16.42)	330.9 (13.03)	204.1 (8.04)	152.7 (6.01)	222.5 (8.76)	468.1 (18.43)	452.1 (17.80)	495.2 (19.50)	4,304.9 (169.48)
Average precipitation days	28	24	27	27	28	26	23	21	23	28	26	27	307
Average relative humidity (%)	93	93	93	93	94	94	94	94	94	94	94	94	94
Mean monthly sunshine hours	52.7	53.6	62.0	72.0	71.3	69.0	86.8	83.7	60.0	55.8	51.0	46.5	764.4
Mean daily sunshine hours	1.7	1.9	2.0	2.4	2.3	2.3	2.8	2.7	2.0	1.8	1.7	1.5	2.1
Source: Instituto de Hidrologia Meteorologia y Estudios Ambientales

== Gallery ==
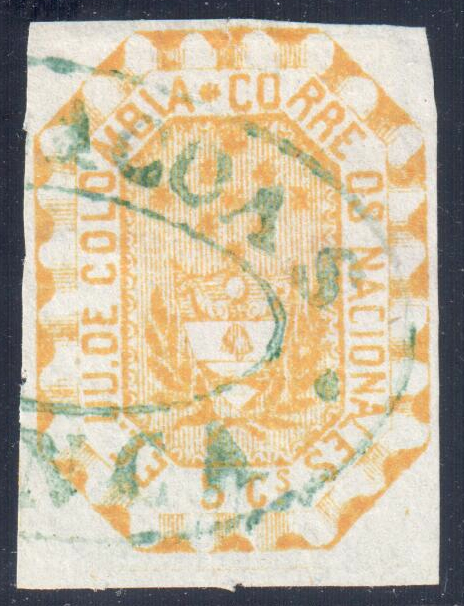
1866 postage stamp postmarked in Barbacoas

== Notable people from Barbacoas ==
- Walden Alexis Vargas, football player
- Déiber Caicedo, football player
- Mateo Cassierra, football player
- Bréiner Castillo, football player
- Carlos Castillo, football player
- Ricardo Coral Dorado, film director.
- Fredy Márquinez, football player
- Rodrigo Sevillano, football player
