= Walden Vargas =

Colombian footballer (born 1984)

Personal information
- Full name: Walden Alexis Vargas
- Date of birth: 25 November 1984 (age 41)
- Place of birth: Barbacoas, Colombia
- Position: Defender

Youth career
- 2003–2005: Deportivo Pasto

Senior career*
Years	Team	Apps	(Gls)
2005–2010	Deportivo Pasto	125	(2)
2011	Atlético Huila	3	(0)
2013–2014	Patriotas Boyacá		
2014	Real Cartagena		
- * Club domestic league appearances and goals as of 21:40, 21 March 2015 (UTC)

Walden Alexis Vargas is a former Colombian football player who played as a defender.
