= Fredy Márquinez =

Colombian footballer (born 1988)

Fredy Marquinez
Personal information
- Full name: John Fredy Marquinez
- Date of birth: 5 March 1988 (age 38)
- Place of birth: Barbacoas, Nariño, Colombia
- Position: Forward

Youth career
- Curicó Unido

Senior career*
Years	Team	Apps	(Gls)
2007	Curicó Unido	9	(0)
2008	Universidad de Concepción	0	(0)
2008	→ Fernández Vial (loan)	3	(0)
2009	Sportivo Luqueño	0	(0)
2011	Estudiantes BA	2	(0)
2012–2014	San Martín Formosa	13	(0)
- * Club domestic league appearances and goals

John Fredy Marquinez (born March 5, 1988, in Barbacoas, Colombia) is a Colombian former association football forward.

== Teams ==
- (Chile) Curicó Unido 2007
- (Chile) Universidad de Concepción 2008
- (Chile) Fernández Vial 2008
- (Paraguay) Sportivo Luqueño 2009
- (Argentina) Estudiantes de Buenos Aires 2011
- (Argentina) San Martín de Formosa 2012–2014
