= Gaitana =

Yalcon military leader

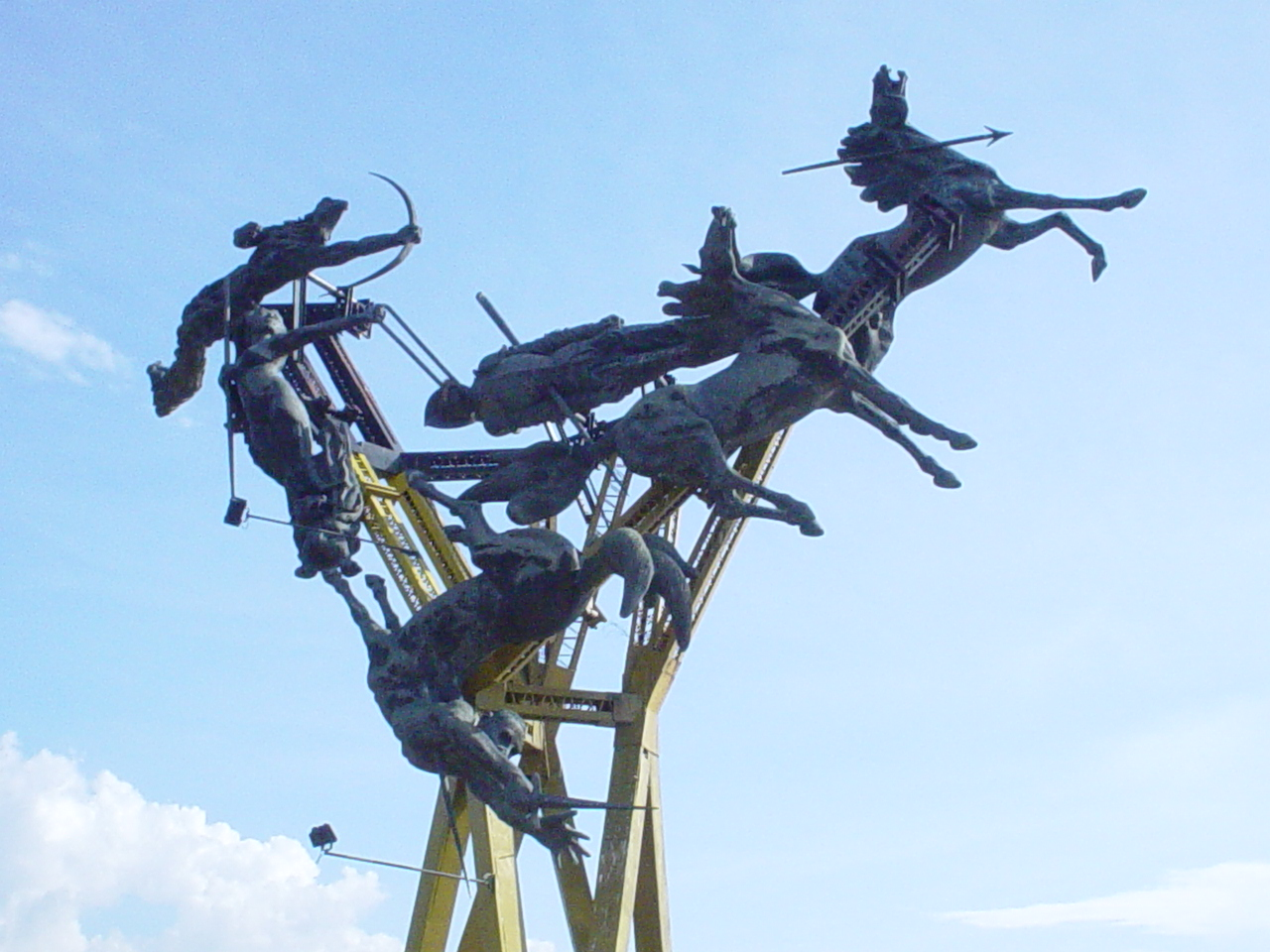
Memorial Monument to Gaitana in Neiva, Colombia

Gaitana, also known as Guaitipan and La Gaitana, was a 16th-century cacica (leader) of an indigenous people in the region of Timaná, Huila. Though some scholars believe she may be a legendary figure, two chronicles report that in 1539–40 she led the indigenous people of the Upper Magdalena River Valley in Colombia in armed resistance against the colonization by the Spanish. Her monument sculpted by Rodrigo Arenas stands in Neiva, the capital of the Huila Department in Colombia.

== Pre-Columbian era ==
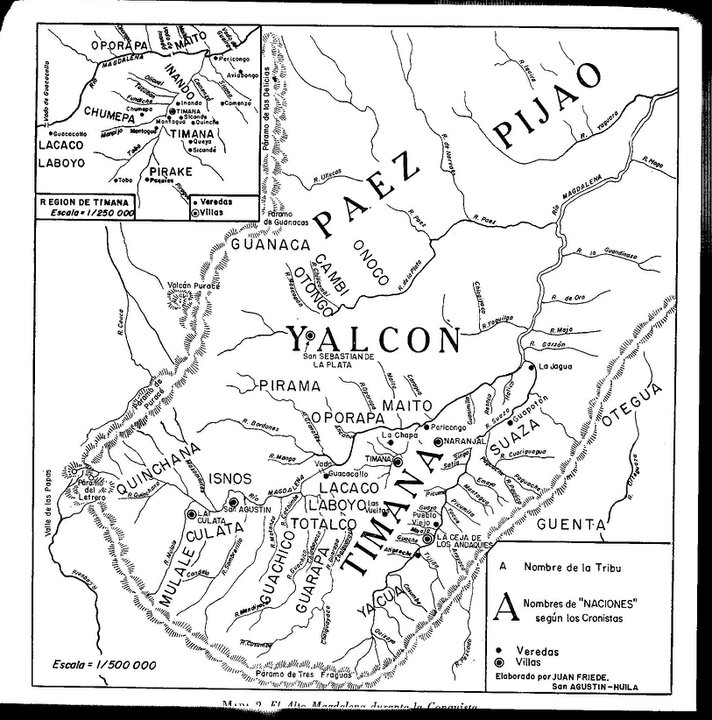
Map of indigenous peoples in the south of Huila

According to Spanish chronologists, at the time of conquest, the modern territory of Huila Department was inhabited by many different indigenous peoples. The Yalcón (with nearly 6,000 warriors), the Avirama, the Pinao, the Guanaca, and the Paez lived north of the Magdalena River, with later concentrations around the La Plata River. South of the Magdalena River lived the Andaquí and Timaná and to the east lived the Pijao.

== Spanish conquest ==
Pedro de Añasco was a Spanish conquistador, sent by Sebastián de Belalcázar to conquer—and found a colony in—the territory of what is today Timaná in order to create a trade route through the Magdalena Valley. The indigenous peoples of the area vigorously opposed this invasion.

De Añasco demanded that all the native leaders pay him a vast tribute. La Gaitana's son was leader (cacique) of one of these tribes, possibly the Yalcón. He was unable to gather the massive amount of tribute demanded, so De Añasco ordered him to be burned alive in front of his mother. Cacica Gaitana, the remaining leader of the tribe, set out for vengeance.

The execution of Gaitana's son caused outrage among the indigenous tribes, who decided to join forces against the Spaniards. Añasco and his men were attacked by surprise. The men were executed and Añasco had his eyes removed and was dragged around the village until he died.

However, one of the indigenous leaders, the cacique Matambo warned the Spaniards about the plans against them, with the result that the indigenous forces were crushed, and the remaining natives were gradually decimated by slavery and smallpox and other European diseases. A few hundred thousand of their descendants are scattered throughout the Colombian southwest as the modern Paez, Guambiano, and Pijao peoples, among others.

== Sources ==
- Banco de la Republica: La Gaitana
- SIMÓN, Fray Pedro. Noticias historiales de las conquistas de Tierra Firme en las Indias Occidentales. Bogotá, 1953, 9 tomos.
- "A Snapshot of Colombia Occupations in Cali, the Peace Process, and Cauca by Justin Podur and Manuel Rozental 07/16/06
- "Will people power have a chance in Colombia?" by Justin Podur 07/16/06
