= Rodrigo Sevillano =

Colombian footballer (born 1985)

Personal information
- Full name: Rodrigo Ariel Sevillano Cabezas
- Date of birth: 17 April 1985 (age 41)
- Place of birth: Barbacoas, Colombia
- Height: 1.79 m (5 ft 10 in)
- Position: Defender

Team information
- Current team: América de Cali

Senior career*
Years	Team	Apps	(Gls)
2005–2009	Deportivo Pasto		
2009	Cúcuta Deportivo		
2010	Boyacá Chicó		
2011	Independiente Santa Fe		
2012	Tiro Federal		
2013	General Díaz		
2014–	América de Cali		
- * Club domestic league appearances and goals

Rodrigo Ariel Sevillano Cabezas (born 17 April 1985), known as Rodrigo Sevillano and as Ariel Sevillano, is a Colombian footballer who plays as a defender for América de Cali of the Categoría Primera B.
