= Francisco Pizarro, Nariño =

Coordinates: 2°06′N 78°43′W

- Municipality and town
- Flag Coat of arms

- Location of the municipality and town of Francisco Pizarro, Nariño in the Nariño Department of Colombia.
- Country: Colombia
- Department: Nariño Department

Area
  - Total: 956 km^{2} (369 sq mi)

Population (Census 2018)
  - Total: 7,430
  - Density: 7.77/km^{2} (20.1/sq mi)
- Time zone: UTC-5 (Colombia Standard Time)

Francisco Pizarro is a town and municipality in the Nariño Department, Colombia named after the Spanish explorer Francisco Pizarro.

Isla del Gallo, where the Famous Thirteen decided to continue the exploration of Peru, belongs to this municipality.

== Climate ==
Francisco Pizarro has a very wet tropical rainforest climate (Köppen Af).

Climate data for Francisco Pizarro
Month	Jan	Feb	Mar	Apr	May	Jun	Jul	Aug	Sep	Oct	Nov	Dec	Year
Mean daily maximum °C (°F)	27.9 (82.2)	28.6 (83.5)	28.9 (84.0)	29.0 (84.2)	28.8 (83.8)	28.8 (83.8)	28.4 (83.1)	28.3 (82.9)	28.2 (82.8)	27.8 (82.0)	27.8 (82.0)	27.9 (82.2)	28.4 (83.0)
Daily mean °C (°F)	25.4 (77.7)	25.9 (78.6)	26.2 (79.2)	26.3 (79.3)	26.2 (79.2)	25.9 (78.6)	25.9 (78.6)	25.9 (78.6)	25.5 (77.9)	25.4 (77.7)	25.4 (77.7)	25.4 (77.7)	25.8 (78.4)
Mean daily minimum °C (°F)	23.0 (73.4)	23.2 (73.8)	23.5 (74.3)	23.6 (74.5)	23.6 (74.5)	23.1 (73.6)	23.4 (74.1)	23.5 (74.3)	22.9 (73.2)	23.1 (73.6)	23.0 (73.4)	23.0 (73.4)	23.2 (73.8)
Average rainfall mm (inches)	449.7 (17.70)	366.5 (14.43)	271.4 (10.69)	395.0 (15.55)	581.0 (22.87)	502.9 (19.80)	394.3 (15.52)	336.9 (13.26)	299.8 (11.80)	316.9 (12.48)	287.0 (11.30)	364.1 (14.33)	4,565.5 (179.73)
Average rainy days	14	11	8	13	17	17	14	13	11	10	9	12	149
Source 1: Instituto de Hidrología, Meteorología y Estudios Ambientales
Source 2:
