= Andaquí people =

Andaquí
Total population
- 248 (2018)

Regions with significant populations
- Cauca, Huila; Colombia

Languages
- Andaquí (extinct)

Religion
- traditional tribal religion

Related ethnic groups
- Páez, Pijao

The Andaquí are an Indigenous people of Colombia, who live in the Upper Caquetá River Basin, the Fragua Valley of Cauca Department, and the Suaza Valley of southwest Huila Department.

== Name ==
The Andaquí, sometimes written Andakí, are also known as the Aguanunga or Churuba.

== History ==
The Andakí are first mentioned in the texts of the Spanish conquistadors in the late 16th century, several decades after the uprisings against the Spanish initiated under the leadership of La Cacica Gaitana in 1536, that united the Yalcon, Nasa, Timaná and other Indigenous nations from the Upper Magdalena Valley. In 1637, conquistador Francisco Dias was attacked by the Andakí and Pijao, which was reported in an act of the cabildo of Timaná on January 28 of that year. The Andakí resistance to colonization lasted until the 18th century and a 1721 uprising included all of the Indigenous nations, such as the Andakí, Tama and Mocoa, of Putumayo and Caquetá.

== Language ==
The Andakí language has been documented having two different recorded vocabularies. The first vocabulary is from an anonymous author from 1788 published in Lenguas de America (1928) and another recompilation by Manuel María Abis, published in 1855. Based on these works, Rivet (1924) classified Andakí as a Chibcha language. Though that classification was supported by some experts, others consider Andakí as a language isolate or without classification and others group it with Páez or other languages from the Amazonian foothills such Astinigua, Camsá and Cofán.

== Currently ==
Currently Andaki communities survive in rural Acevedo, Huila and Belén de los Andaquíes, Caqueta, in the areas of the Pescado and Fragua Rivers, though these communities do not conserve their language. These communities are not recognized by the Colombian government though are documented by the National Indigenous Organization of Colombia as Andakí communities. According to elders from the Inga People that now live in part of what was the ancestral Andakí territory, they insist that there are still Andaquí in the forests below the Fragua peaks in the south of Cauca that refuse contact. Documents from the 19th century cite that area as the last known area of the jungle inhabited by the Andaquí.
