= Albania, Caquetá =

Coordinates: 1.33167°N 75.8822°W

- Municipality and town
- Flag

- Location of the municipality and town of Albania, Caquetá, Colombia.
- Country: Colombia
- Department: Caquetá Department
- Time zone: UTC-5 (Colombia Standard Time)

Albania is a town and municipality in Caquetá Department, Colombia.
