= Mosquera, Nariño =

Coordinates: 2.49028°N 78.4953°W

- Municipality and town
- Flag Coat of arms

- Location of the municipality and town of Mosquera, Nariño in the Nariño Department of Colombia.
- Country: Colombia
- Department: Nariño Department

Area
  - Total: 1,770 km^{2} (680 sq mi)

Population (Census 2018)
  - Total: 10,203
  - Density: 5.76/km^{2} (14.9/sq mi)
- Time zone: UTC-5 (Colombia Standard Time)

Mosquera is a town and municipality in the Nariño Department, Colombia.

== Climate ==
Mosquera has a tropical rainforest climate (Köppen Af) with heavy to very heavy rainfall year-round.

Climate data for Mosquera
Month	Jan	Feb	Mar	Apr	May	Jun	Jul	Aug	Sep	Oct	Nov	Dec	Year
Mean daily maximum °C (°F)	28.4 (83.1)	29.3 (84.7)	29.6 (85.3)	29.6 (85.3)	29.3 (84.7)	29.3 (84.7)	29.0 (84.2)	28.8 (83.8)	28.6 (83.5)	28.6 (83.5)	28.1 (82.6)	28.4 (83.1)	28.9 (84.0)
Daily mean °C (°F)	25.5 (77.9)	25.9 (78.6)	26.1 (79.0)	26.3 (79.3)	26.1 (79.0)	25.9 (78.6)	25.8 (78.4)	25.7 (78.3)	25.5 (77.9)	25.4 (77.7)	25.4 (77.7)	25.4 (77.7)	25.7 (78.3)
Mean daily minimum °C (°F)	22.6 (72.7)	22.5 (72.5)	22.7 (72.9)	23.0 (73.4)	23.0 (73.4)	22.5 (72.5)	22.7 (72.9)	22.7 (72.9)	22.5 (72.5)	22.8 (73.0)	22.7 (72.9)	22.5 (72.5)	22.7 (72.8)
Average rainfall mm (inches)	305 (12.0)	264 (10.4)	228 (9.0)	309 (12.2)	475 (18.7)	477 (18.8)	308 (12.1)	256 (10.1)	346 (13.6)	325 (12.8)	248 (9.8)	215 (8.5)	3,756 (148)
