= Guadalupe, Huila =

Coordinates: 2.025°N 75.7572°W

- Municipality and town
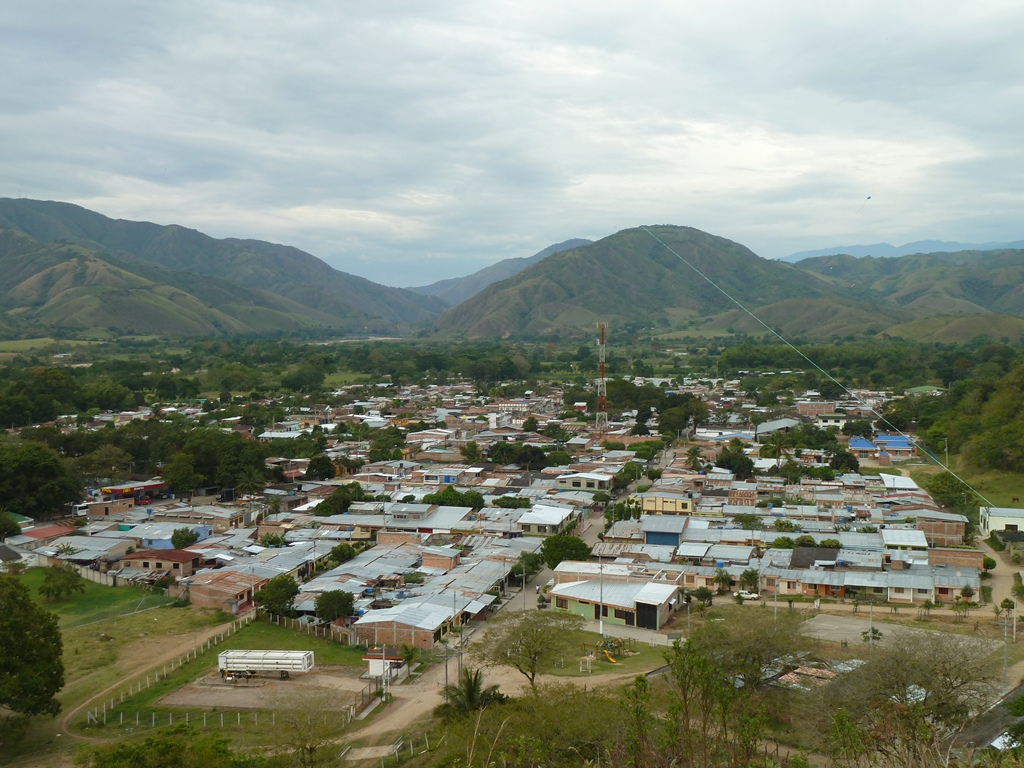
- View of Guadalupe

- Flag Coat of arms

- Location of the municipality and town of Guadalupe, Huila in the Huila Department of Colombia.
- Country: Colombia
- Department: Huila Department

Population (Census 2018)
  - Total: 15,913
- Time zone: UTC-5 (Colombia Standard Time)

Guadalupe is a town and municipality in the Huila Department, Colombia.

== Climate ==
Climate data for Guadalupe (Resina), elevation 2,102 m (6,896 ft), (1981–2010)
Month	Jan	Feb	Mar	Apr	May	Jun	Jul	Aug	Sep	Oct	Nov	Dec	Year
Mean daily maximum °C (°F)	21.1 (70.0)	21.0 (69.8)	20.9 (69.6)	20.7 (69.3)	20.3 (68.5)	19.8 (67.6)	19.2 (66.6)	19.5 (67.1)	20.4 (68.7)	20.6 (69.1)	20.6 (69.1)	20.7 (69.3)	20.4 (68.7)
Daily mean °C (°F)	16.2 (61.2)	16.2 (61.2)	16.2 (61.2)	16.2 (61.2)	16.1 (61.0)	15.6 (60.1)	14.9 (58.8)	15.2 (59.4)	15.8 (60.4)	16.1 (61.0)	16.2 (61.2)	16.4 (61.5)	15.9 (60.6)
Mean daily minimum °C (°F)	13.3 (55.9)	13.4 (56.1)	13.5 (56.3)	13.5 (56.3)	13.5 (56.3)	12.9 (55.2)	12.3 (54.1)	12.5 (54.5)	12.9 (55.2)	13.2 (55.8)	13.4 (56.1)	13.4 (56.1)	13.2 (55.8)
Average precipitation mm (inches)	90.7 (3.57)	112.8 (4.44)	162.1 (6.38)	206.7 (8.14)	239.0 (9.41)	262.3 (10.33)	291.8 (11.49)	220.7 (8.69)	180.4 (7.10)	177.5 (6.99)	145.2 (5.72)	110.2 (4.34)	2,137.2 (84.14)
Average precipitation days	16	16	22	25	27	26	27	26	24	25	23	20	268
Average relative humidity (%)	85	86	86	87	87	87	87	86	85	86	88	86	87
Mean monthly sunshine hours	114.7	98.8	89.9	87.0	96.1	105.0	102.3	111.6	114.0	102.3	87.0	105.4	1,214.1
Mean daily sunshine hours	3.7	3.5	2.9	2.9	3.1	3.5	3.3	3.6	3.8	3.3	2.9	3.4	3.3
Source: Instituto de Hidrologia Meteorologia y Estudios Ambientales
