= Olaya Herrera =

- Municipality and town
- Location of the municipality and town of Olaya Herrera in the Nariño Department of Colombia.
- Coordinates: 2°20′49″N 78°19′32″W
- Country: Colombia
- Department: Nariño Department

Population (2020 est.)
  - Total: 33,132
- Time zone: UTC-5 (Colombia Standard Time)

Olaya Herrera is a town and municipality in the Nariño Department, Colombia. Named after the former President of Colombia Enrique Olaya Herrera. Its municipal seat is known as Bocas de Satinga.

== Climate ==
Olaya Herrera has a tropical rainforest climate (Köppen Af) with heavy to very heavy rainfall year-round.

Climate data for Bocas de Satinga
Month	Jan	Feb	Mar	Apr	May	Jun	Jul	Aug	Sep	Oct	Nov	Dec	Year
Mean daily maximum °C (°F)	28.6 (83.5)	29.5 (85.1)	29.9 (85.8)	29.8 (85.6)	29.5 (85.1)	29.6 (85.3)	29.4 (84.9)	29.2 (84.6)	29.0 (84.2)	28.3 (82.9)	28.4 (83.1)	28.8 (83.8)	29.2 (84.5)
Daily mean °C (°F)	25.5 (77.9)	25.9 (78.6)	26.3 (79.3)	26.3 (79.3)	26.2 (79.2)	26.1 (79.0)	26.0 (78.8)	26.0 (78.8)	25.8 (78.4)	25.5 (77.9)	25.6 (78.1)	25.6 (78.1)	25.9 (78.6)
Mean daily minimum °C (°F)	22.5 (72.5)	22.4 (72.3)	22.7 (72.9)	22.9 (73.2)	23.0 (73.4)	22.6 (72.7)	22.6 (72.7)	22.8 (73.0)	22.6 (72.7)	22.8 (73.0)	22.8 (73.0)	22.5 (72.5)	22.7 (72.8)
Average rainfall mm (inches)	330 (13.0)	293 (11.5)	257 (10.1)	348 (13.7)	502 (19.8)	489 (19.3)	320 (12.6)	264 (10.4)	346 (13.6)	329 (13.0)	254 (10.0)	231 (9.1)	3,963 (156.1)
Source: Climate-Data.org
