= Puerto Rico, Caquetá =

Coordinates: 1.91417°N 75.145°W

- Municipality and town
- Flag Seal

- Location of the municipality and town of Puerto Rico, Caquetá in the Caquetá Department of Colombia.
- Country: Colombia
- Department: Caquetá Department

Population (2020 est.)
  - Total: 33,765
- Time zone: UTC-5 (Colombia Standard Time)

Puerto Rico is a town and municipality in Caquetá Department, Colombia.

== Climate ==
Puerto Rico has a very wet tropical rainforest climate (Af).

Climate data for Puerto Rico (Pto Rico), elevation 285 m (935 ft), (1981–2010)
Month	Jan	Feb	Mar	Apr	May	Jun	Jul	Aug	Sep	Oct	Nov	Dec	Year
Mean daily maximum °C (°F)	32.7 (90.9)	32.2 (90.0)	31.2 (88.2)	30.2 (86.4)	29.9 (85.8)	29.1 (84.4)	28.8 (83.8)	29.9 (85.8)	30.9 (87.6)	31.2 (88.2)	31.2 (88.2)	31.7 (89.1)	30.7 (87.3)
Daily mean °C (°F)	26.9 (80.4)	26.7 (80.1)	26.1 (79.0)	25.6 (78.1)	25.3 (77.5)	24.8 (76.6)	24.4 (75.9)	25.1 (77.2)	25.6 (78.1)	25.8 (78.4)	26.1 (79.0)	26.4 (79.5)	25.7 (78.3)
Mean daily minimum °C (°F)	21.6 (70.9)	21.8 (71.2)	22.0 (71.6)	22.0 (71.6)	21.9 (71.4)	21.4 (70.5)	20.9 (69.6)	21.1 (70.0)	21.3 (70.3)	21.7 (71.1)	22.0 (71.6)	21.8 (71.2)	21.6 (70.9)
Average precipitation mm (inches)	107.8 (4.24)	199.1 (7.84)	377.5 (14.86)	495.3 (19.50)	540.0 (21.26)	497.6 (19.59)	408.7 (16.09)	324.9 (12.79)	350.0 (13.78)	351.7 (13.85)	278.6 (10.97)	132.3 (5.21)	3,992.2 (157.17)
Average precipitation days	10	14	20	24	26	26	25	23	20	22	19	12	236
Average relative humidity (%)	76	78	83	86	86	87	87	84	83	83	83	80	83
Mean monthly sunshine hours	158.1	112.9	93.0	87.0	89.9	75.0	83.7	111.6	129.0	124.0	129.0	161.2	1,354.4
Mean daily sunshine hours	5.1	4.0	3.0	2.9	2.9	2.5	2.7	3.6	4.3	4.0	4.3	5.2	3.7
Source: Instituto de Hidrologia Meteorologia y Estudios Ambientales
