= Belén de Andaquies, Colombia =

Coordinates: 1.41611°N 75.8725°W

Belén de Andaquies
- Municipality and town
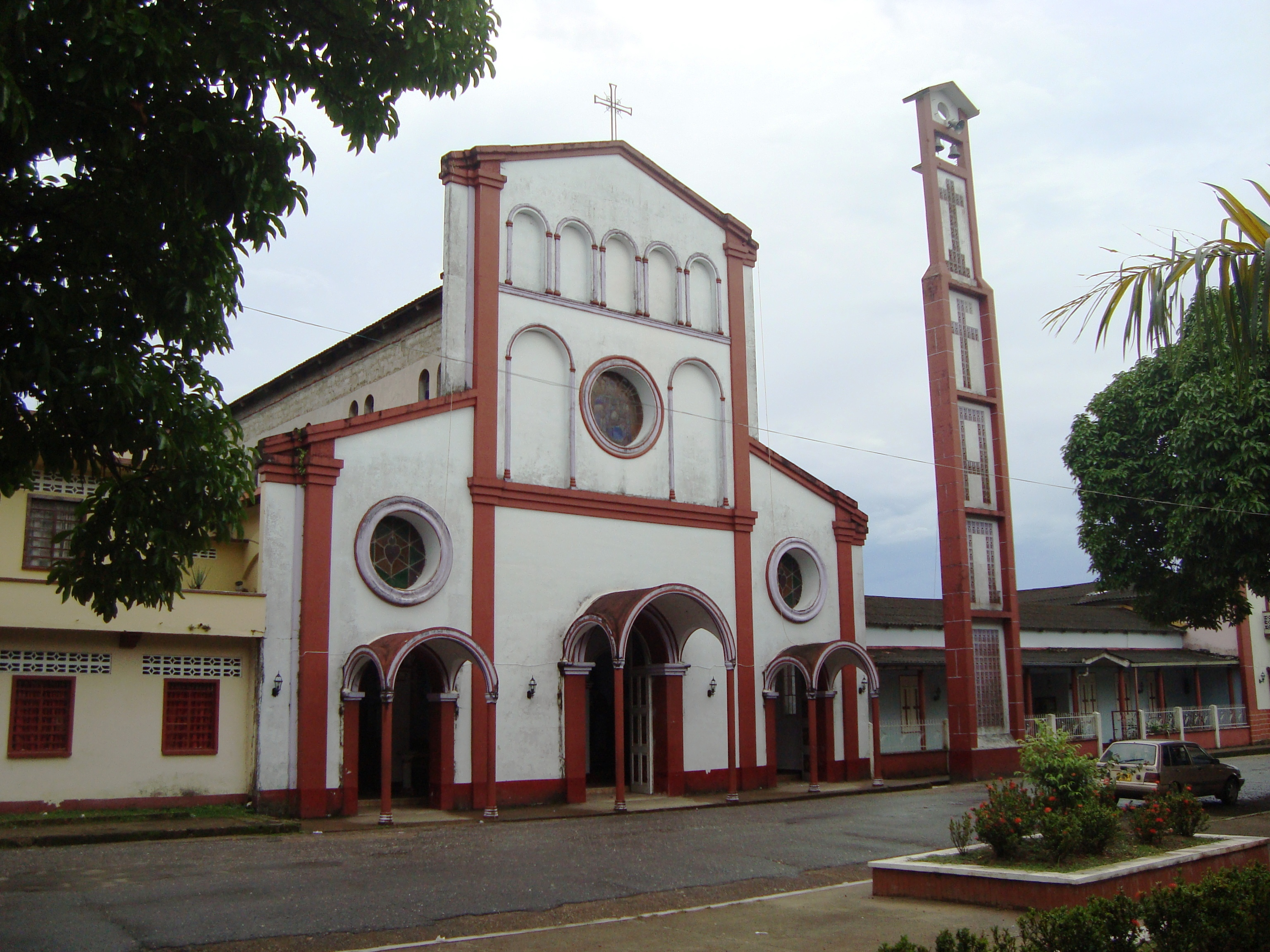

- Flag Coat of arms

- Location of the municipality and town of Belén de Andaquies in the Caquetá Department of Colombia.
- Country: Colombia
- Department: Caquetá Department

Area
  - Total: 1,095 km^{2} (423 sq mi)

Population (Census 2018)
  - Total: 9,075
  - Density: 8.288/km^{2} (21.46/sq mi)
- Time zone: UTC-5 (Colombia Standard Time)

Belén de los Andaquíes is a town and municipality in Caquetá Department, Colombia.

== Climate ==
Belén de los Andaquíes has a very wet tropical rainforest climate (Af).

Climate data for Belén de Andaquies (Mono La), elevation 300 m (980 ft), (1981–2010)
Month	Jan	Feb	Mar	Apr	May	Jun	Jul	Aug	Sep	Oct	Nov	Dec	Year
Mean daily maximum °C (°F)	31.9 (89.4)	31.3 (88.3)	30.6 (87.1)	29.9 (85.8)	29.6 (85.3)	28.9 (84.0)	28.8 (83.8)	29.8 (85.6)	30.9 (87.6)	31.0 (87.8)	31.0 (87.8)	31.3 (88.3)	30.4 (86.7)
Daily mean °C (°F)	26.2 (79.2)	25.8 (78.4)	25.5 (77.9)	25.1 (77.2)	25.0 (77.0)	24.5 (76.1)	24.2 (75.6)	24.8 (76.6)	25.4 (77.7)	25.6 (78.1)	25.7 (78.3)	25.9 (78.6)	25.3 (77.5)
Mean daily minimum °C (°F)	20.9 (69.6)	20.7 (69.3)	20.8 (69.4)	20.7 (69.3)	20.7 (69.3)	20.5 (68.9)	20.1 (68.2)	20.4 (68.7)	20.6 (69.1)	20.8 (69.4)	21.0 (69.8)	20.8 (69.4)	20.7 (69.3)
Average precipitation mm (inches)	144.8 (5.70)	219.6 (8.65)	311.4 (12.26)	409.2 (16.11)	441.0 (17.36)	399.1 (15.71)	338.8 (13.34)	269.4 (10.61)	252.8 (9.95)	310.9 (12.24)	271.4 (10.69)	160.9 (6.33)	3,529.3 (138.95)
Average precipitation days	12	15	20	23	24	23	22	19	19	19	19	14	228
Average relative humidity (%)	82	84	85	87	87	87	87	85	84	84	84	83	85
Mean monthly sunshine hours	167.4	118.6	105.4	99.0	105.4	96.0	102.3	124.0	144.0	148.8	141.0	158.1	1,510
Mean daily sunshine hours	5.4	4.2	3.4	3.3	3.4	3.2	3.3	4.0	4.8	4.8	4.7	5.1	4.1
Source: Instituto de Hidrologia Meteorologia y Estudios Ambientales
