= Roberto Payán =

Coordinates: 1°41′48″N 78°14′43″W

- Municipality and town
- Location of the municipality and town of Roberto Payán in the Nariño Department of Colombia.
- Country: Colombia
- Department: Nariño Department

Population (Census 2018)
  - Total: 10,473
- Time zone: UTC-5 (Colombia Standard Time)

Roberto Payán is a town and municipality in the Nariño Department, Colombia. The municipal seat is known as San José de las Lagunas.
