= Valparaíso, Caquetá =

Coordinates: 1.19917°N 75.7097°W

- Municipality and town
- Flag

- Location of the municipality and town of Valparaíso, Caquetá in the Caquetá Department of Colombia.
- Country: Colombia
- Department: Caquetá Department

Area
  - Total: 1,218 km^{2} (470 sq mi)

Population (Census 2018)
  - Total: 6,082
  - Density: 4.993/km^{2} (12.93/sq mi)
- Time zone: UTC-5 (Colombia Standard Time)

Valparaíso (Spanish pronunciation: [balpaɾaˈiso]) is a town and municipality in Caquetá Department, Colombia.

== Climate ==
Valparaíso has a tropical rainforest climate (Köppen Af) with heavy to very heavy rainfall year-round.

Climate data for Valparaíso, elevation 270 m (890 ft), (1981–2010)
Month	Jan	Feb	Mar	Apr	May	Jun	Jul	Aug	Sep	Oct	Nov	Dec	Year
Mean daily maximum °C (°F)	32.2 (90.0)	31.8 (89.2)	31.3 (88.3)	30.5 (86.9)	30.4 (86.7)	29.6 (85.3)	29.6 (85.3)	30.4 (86.7)	31.2 (88.2)	31.5 (88.7)	31.6 (88.9)	31.9 (89.4)	31.0 (87.8)
Daily mean °C (°F)	26.9 (80.4)	26.6 (79.9)	26.3 (79.3)	25.8 (78.4)	25.7 (78.3)	25.3 (77.5)	25.2 (77.4)	25.6 (78.1)	26.1 (79.0)	26.4 (79.5)	26.5 (79.7)	26.6 (79.9)	26.1 (79.0)
Mean daily minimum °C (°F)	22.0 (71.6)	22.0 (71.6)	22.1 (71.8)	22.1 (71.8)	22.0 (71.6)	21.6 (70.9)	21.2 (70.2)	21.3 (70.3)	21.7 (71.1)	22.0 (71.6)	22.3 (72.1)	22.1 (71.8)	21.9 (71.4)
Average precipitation mm (inches)	125.0 (4.92)	212.4 (8.36)	282.0 (11.10)	388.2 (15.28)	360.7 (14.20)	351.0 (13.82)	332.8 (13.10)	237.2 (9.34)	218.1 (8.59)	230.7 (9.08)	214.3 (8.44)	129.9 (5.11)	3,082.3 (121.34)
Average precipitation days	10.0	12.8	16.2	20.1	20.5	21.2	20.1	17.4	15.4	15.4	13.3	10.6	193
Average relative humidity (%)	80.6	81.9	84.2	86.2	86.7	86.9	86.0	84.3	83.4	83.0	83.4	81.6	84.0
Source: Instituto de Hidrologia Meteorologia y Estudios Ambientales
