= Morelia, Colombia =

Coordinates: 1.4875°N 75.725°W

Morelia, Caquetá
- Municipality and town
- Flag

- Location of the municipality and town of Morelia, Caquetá Department, Colombia.
- Country: Colombia
- Department: Caquetá Department
- Time zone: UTC-5 (Colombia Standard Time)
- Website: www.morelia-caqueta.gov.co/

Morelia is a town and municipality in Caquetá Department, Colombia. Morelia contains many ecological areas, such as El Rio Bodoquero valley, which attracts the majority of tourists and local residents.

== See also ==
- Municipalities of Colombia
