= Cartagena del Chairá =

Coordinates: 1°21′N 74°50′W

- Municipality and town
- Flag

- Location of the municipality and town of Cartagena del Chairá in the Caquetá Department of Colombia.
- Country: Colombia
- Department: Caquetá Department

Population (2020 est.)
  - Total: 35,993
- Time zone: UTC-5 (Colombia Standard Time)

Cartagena del Chairá (Spanish pronunciation: [kaɾtaˈxena ðel tʃajˈɾa]) is a town and municipality in the Colombian Department of Caquetá. The town gained notoriety during the failed FARC-Government peace process (1999-2002) between the Government of Colombia and the guerrilla group Revolutionary Armed Forces of Colombia (FARC) which still maintains operations and a high influence in the area despite the presence of the Colombian military.
