= Los Andes, Nariño =

Los Andes
- Municipality and town
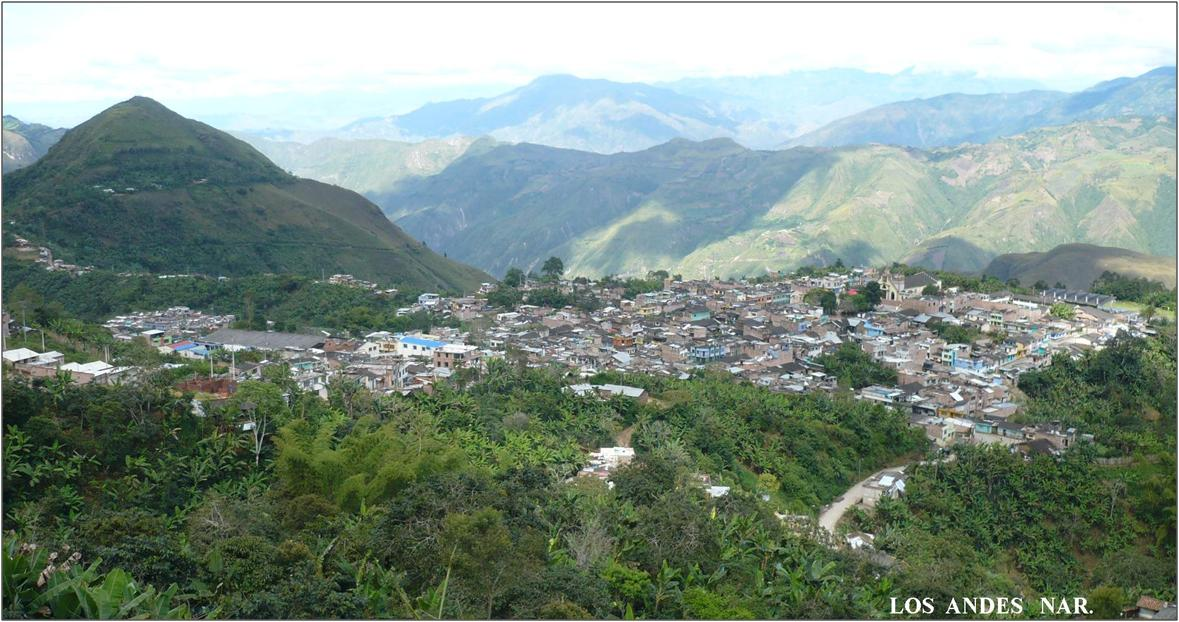
- View of Los Andes, Nariño

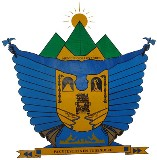
- Flag Coat of arms

- Location of the municipality and town of Los Andes in the Nariño Department of Colombia
- Coordinates: 1°29′36″N 77°31′17″W
- Country: Colombia
- Department: Nariño Department

Population (Census 2018)
  - Total: 8,703
- Time zone: UTC-5 (Colombia Standard Time)

Los Andes is a town and municipality in the Nariño Department, Colombia.
