= Solita, Caquetá =

Coordinates: 0°52′N 75°39′W

Solita
- Municipality and town
- Flag Coat of arms

- Location of the municipality and town of Solita in the Caquetá Department of Colombia.
- Country: Colombia
- Department: Caquetá Department
- Time zone: UTC-5 (Colombia Standard Time)

Solita is a town and municipality in Caquetá Department, Colombia.
