= San Vicente del Caguán =

- Municipality and town
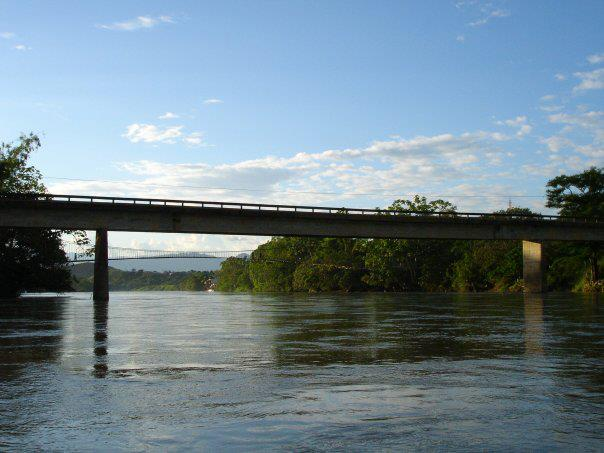
- The Caguán River in San Vicente del Caguán

- Flag Coat of arms

- Location of the municipality and town of San Vicente del Caguán in the Caquetá Department of Colombia.
- Coordinates: 02°06′37″N 74°06′07″W
- Country: Colombia
- Department: Caquetá Department

Government
  - Alcalde: Domingo Emilio Pérez Cuellar

Area
  - Municipality and town: 17,465 km^{2} (6,743 sq mi)
  - Urban: 4.86 km^{2} (1.88 sq mi)
- Elevation: 280 m (920 ft)

Population (2018 census)
  - Municipality and town: 50,719
  - Density: 2.9040/km^{2} (7.5214/sq mi)
  - Urban: 23,432
  - Urban density: 4,820/km^{2} (12,500/sq mi)
- Time zone: UTC-5 (Colombia Standard Time)
- Website: www.sanvicentedelcaguan.gov.co

San Vicente del Caguán (Spanish pronunciation: [sam biˈsente ðel kaˈɣwan]) is a town and municipality in Amazonian Caquetá Department, southern Colombia.

== Religion ==
Its Marian Catedral Nuestra Señora de las Mercedes (dedicated to the Virgin of Mercy) is the cathedral episcopal see of the Roman Catholic Diocese of San Vicente del Caguán.

== History ==
Between 1998 and 2002, San Vicente del Caguán was the center of the demilitarized zone (DMZ), which was created as a safe haven for the revolutionary FARC rebels. Two days after the peace talks were ended, Ingrid Betancourt was kidnapped while entering the former DMZ.

== Climate ==
Climate data for San Vicente del Caguán (S.Vcte Caguan), elevation 300 m (980 ft), (1981–2010)
Month	Jan	Feb	Mar	Apr	May	Jun	Jul	Aug	Sep	Oct	Nov	Dec	Year
Mean daily maximum °C (°F)	33.5 (92.3)	33.0 (91.4)	31.9 (89.4)	31.1 (88.0)	30.7 (87.3)	29.7 (85.5)	29.5 (85.1)	30.5 (86.9)	31.4 (88.5)	31.8 (89.2)	31.9 (89.4)	32.8 (91.0)	31.3 (88.3)
Daily mean °C (°F)	27.3 (81.1)	27.3 (81.1)	26.6 (79.9)	26.0 (78.8)	25.8 (78.4)	25.1 (77.2)	24.7 (76.5)	25.4 (77.7)	25.7 (78.3)	26.1 (79.0)	26.2 (79.2)	26.8 (80.2)	26 (79)
Mean daily minimum °C (°F)	20.7 (69.3)	21.3 (70.3)	21.8 (71.2)	22.0 (71.6)	22.0 (71.6)	21.4 (70.5)	21.2 (70.2)	21.2 (70.2)	21.1 (70.0)	21.6 (70.9)	21.7 (71.1)	21.2 (70.2)	21.4 (70.5)
Average precipitation mm (inches)	49.1 (1.93)	124.1 (4.89)	219.1 (8.63)	331.3 (13.04)	315.8 (12.43)	346.9 (13.66)	287.9 (11.33)	199.4 (7.85)	203.2 (8.00)	215.3 (8.48)	140.4 (5.53)	59.4 (2.34)	2,440.8 (96.09)
Average precipitation days	6	9	15	21	23	24	23	20	18	18	14	10	187
Average relative humidity (%)	72	73	78	83	83	84	84	82	81	82	82	77	80
Mean monthly sunshine hours	213.9	149.6	127.1	102.0	124.0	108.0	108.5	133.3	153.0	164.3	177.0	204.6	1,765.3
Mean daily sunshine hours	6.9	5.3	4.1	3.4	4.0	3.6	3.5	4.3	5.1	5.3	5.9	6.6	4.8
Source: Instituto de Hidrologia Meteorologia y Estudios Ambientales

Climate data for San Vicente del Caguán (Sta Rosa Caguan), elevation 240 m (790 ft), (1981–2010)
Month	Jan	Feb	Mar	Apr	May	Jun	Jul	Aug	Sep	Oct	Nov	Dec	Year
Mean daily maximum °C (°F)	34.0 (93.2)	34.1 (93.4)	31.9 (89.4)	31.3 (88.3)	30.4 (86.7)	30.1 (86.2)	29.5 (85.1)	30.8 (87.4)	31.9 (89.4)	32.3 (90.1)	32.1 (89.8)	32.9 (91.2)	31.7 (89.1)
Daily mean °C (°F)	26.8 (80.2)	26.7 (80.1)	26.1 (79.0)	25.6 (78.1)	25.3 (77.5)	24.6 (76.3)	24.4 (75.9)	25.0 (77.0)	25.5 (77.9)	25.9 (78.6)	26.0 (78.8)	26.4 (79.5)	25.7 (78.3)
Mean daily minimum °C (°F)	20.8 (69.4)	21.4 (70.5)	22.0 (71.6)	22.3 (72.1)	22.1 (71.8)	21.7 (71.1)	21.2 (70.2)	21.4 (70.5)	21.6 (70.9)	21.9 (71.4)	22.0 (71.6)	21.3 (70.3)	21.7 (71.1)
Average precipitation mm (inches)	55.8 (2.20)	135.9 (5.35)	276.4 (10.88)	337.5 (13.29)	347.9 (13.70)	351.0 (13.82)	292.5 (11.52)	223.0 (8.78)	219.8 (8.65)	261.0 (10.28)	164.3 (6.47)	74.5 (2.93)	2,696 (106.14)
Average precipitation days	6	10	16	21	22	22	19	18	16	17	14	7	185
Average relative humidity (%)	75	77	82	86	87	88	87	85	84	84	83	79	83
Source: Instituto de Hidrologia Meteorologia y Estudios Ambientales
