= La Montañita =

Coordinates: 1°35′N 75°15′W

- Municipality and town
- Flag Coat of arms

- Location of the municipality and town of La Montañita in the Caquetá Department of Colombia.
- Country: Colombia
- Department: Caquetá Department

Population (Census 2018)
  - Total: 12,128
- Time zone: UTC-5 (Colombia Standard Time)

La Montañita is a town and municipality in Caquetá Department, Colombia.
