= San José del Fragua =

- Municipality and town
- Flag Coat of arms

- Location of the municipality and town of San José del Fragua in the Caquetá Department of Colombia
- Coordinates: 1°19′43″N 75°58′22″W
- Country: Colombia
- Department: Caquetá Department

Area
  - Total: 1,226 km^{2} (473 sq mi)

Population (Census 2018)
  - Total: 11,364
  - Density: 9.269/km^{2} (24.01/sq mi)
- Time zone: UTC-5 (Colombia Standard Time)

San José del Fragua (Spanish pronunciation: [saŋ xoˈse ðel ˈfɾaɣwa]) is a town and municipality in Caquetá Department, Colombia.

== Climate ==
San José del Fragua has a tropical rainforest climate (Köppen Af) with heavy to very heavy rainfall year-round.

Climate data for San José del Fragua, elevation 320 m (1,050 ft), (1981–2010)
Month	Jan	Feb	Mar	Apr	May	Jun	Jul	Aug	Sep	Oct	Nov	Dec	Year
Mean daily maximum °C (°F)	31.4 (88.5)	31.1 (88.0)	30.3 (86.5)	29.8 (85.6)	29.6 (85.3)	28.7 (83.7)	28.5 (83.3)	29.6 (85.3)	30.8 (87.4)	31.1 (88.0)	30.8 (87.4)	31.0 (87.8)	30.2 (86.4)
Daily mean °C (°F)	26.0 (78.8)	25.7 (78.3)	25.3 (77.5)	25.0 (77.0)	24.9 (76.8)	24.3 (75.7)	24.0 (75.2)	24.6 (76.3)	25.4 (77.7)	25.5 (77.9)	25.5 (77.9)	25.7 (78.3)	25.2 (77.4)
Mean daily minimum °C (°F)	21.7 (71.1)	21.6 (70.9)	21.4 (70.5)	21.2 (70.2)	21.3 (70.3)	20.6 (69.1)	20.2 (68.4)	20.4 (68.7)	20.8 (69.4)	21.1 (70.0)	21.4 (70.5)	21.6 (70.9)	21.1 (70.0)
Average precipitation mm (inches)	177.1 (6.97)	269.5 (10.61)	355.0 (13.98)	505.1 (19.89)	522.0 (20.55)	441.2 (17.37)	358.3 (14.11)	308.9 (12.16)	296.1 (11.66)	360.9 (14.21)	365.3 (14.38)	226.5 (8.92)	4,169.7 (164.16)
Average precipitation days	15	16	22	25	25	25	24	22	20	21	21	19	253
Average relative humidity (%)	81	82	85	87	86	88	87	85	83	83	84	84	85
Source: Instituto de Hidrologia Meteorologia y Estudios Ambientales
