= Milán, Caquetá =

Coordinates: 1°17′21″N 75°30′23″W

Milán
- Municipality and town
- Flag Seal

- Location of the municipality and town of Milán in the Caquetá Department of Colombia.
- Country: Colombia
- Department: Caquetá Department

Area
  - Total: 137 km^{2} (53 sq mi)

Population (Census 2018)
  - Total: 7,507
  - Density: 54.8/km^{2} (142/sq mi)
- Time zone: UTC-5 (Colombia Standard Time)

Milán is a small town and municipality in Caquetá Department, Colombia.
