= Curillo =

Coordinates: 1°02′N 75°55′W

- Municipality and town
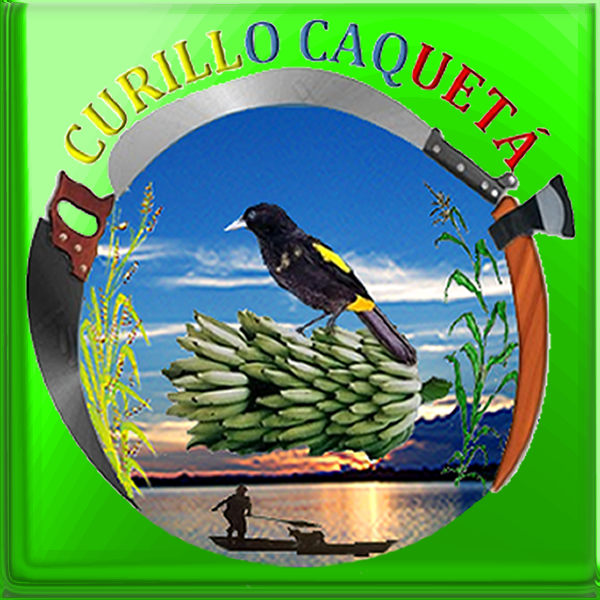
- Flag Seal

- Location of the municipality and town of Curillo in the Caquetá Department of Colombia.
- Country: Colombia
- Department: Caquetá Department

Area
  - Total: 459 km^{2} (177 sq mi)

Population (Census 2018)
  - Total: 7,518
  - Density: 16.4/km^{2} (42.4/sq mi)
- Time zone: UTC-5 (Colombia Standard Time)

Curillo is a town and municipality in Caquetá Department, Colombia.
