= El Paujil =

Coordinates: 1.56444°N 75.3319°W

- Municipality and town
- Flag Coat of arms

- Location of the municipality and town of El Paujil in the Caquetá Department of Colombia.
- Country: Colombia
- Department: Caquetá Department

Population (Census 2018)
  - Total: 13,014
- Time zone: UTC-5 (Colombia Standard Time)

El Paujil is a town and municipality in Caquetá Department, Colombia.
