= Caquetá Department =

Department of Colombia

Department of Caquetá Departamento del Caquetá
- Department
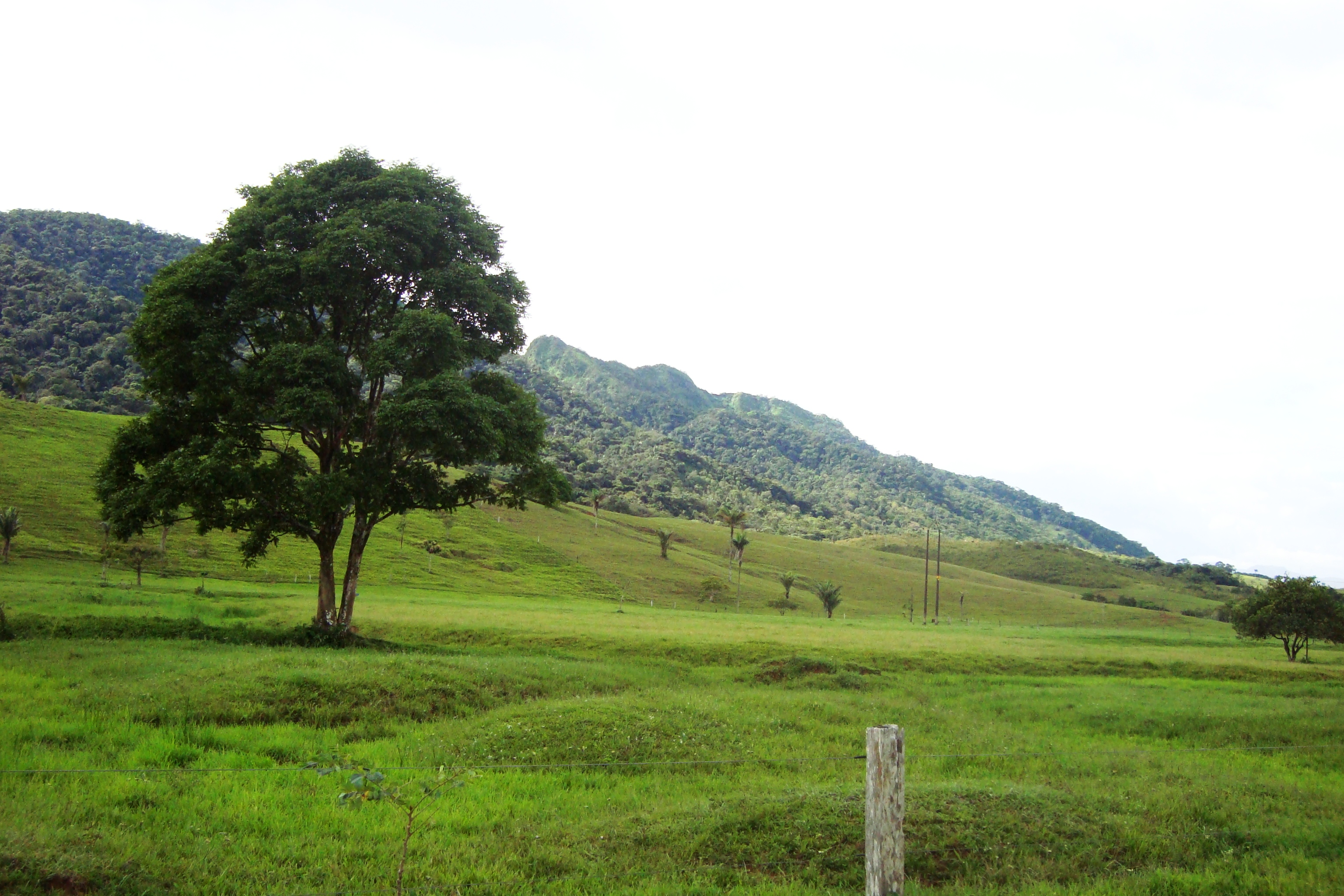
- Foothills of Caquetá

- Flag Coat of arms
- Nickname: The Golden Gate to the Amazon
- Motto: All, For a Better Caquetá (Spanish: Todos por un Caquetá mejor)
- Caquetá shown in red

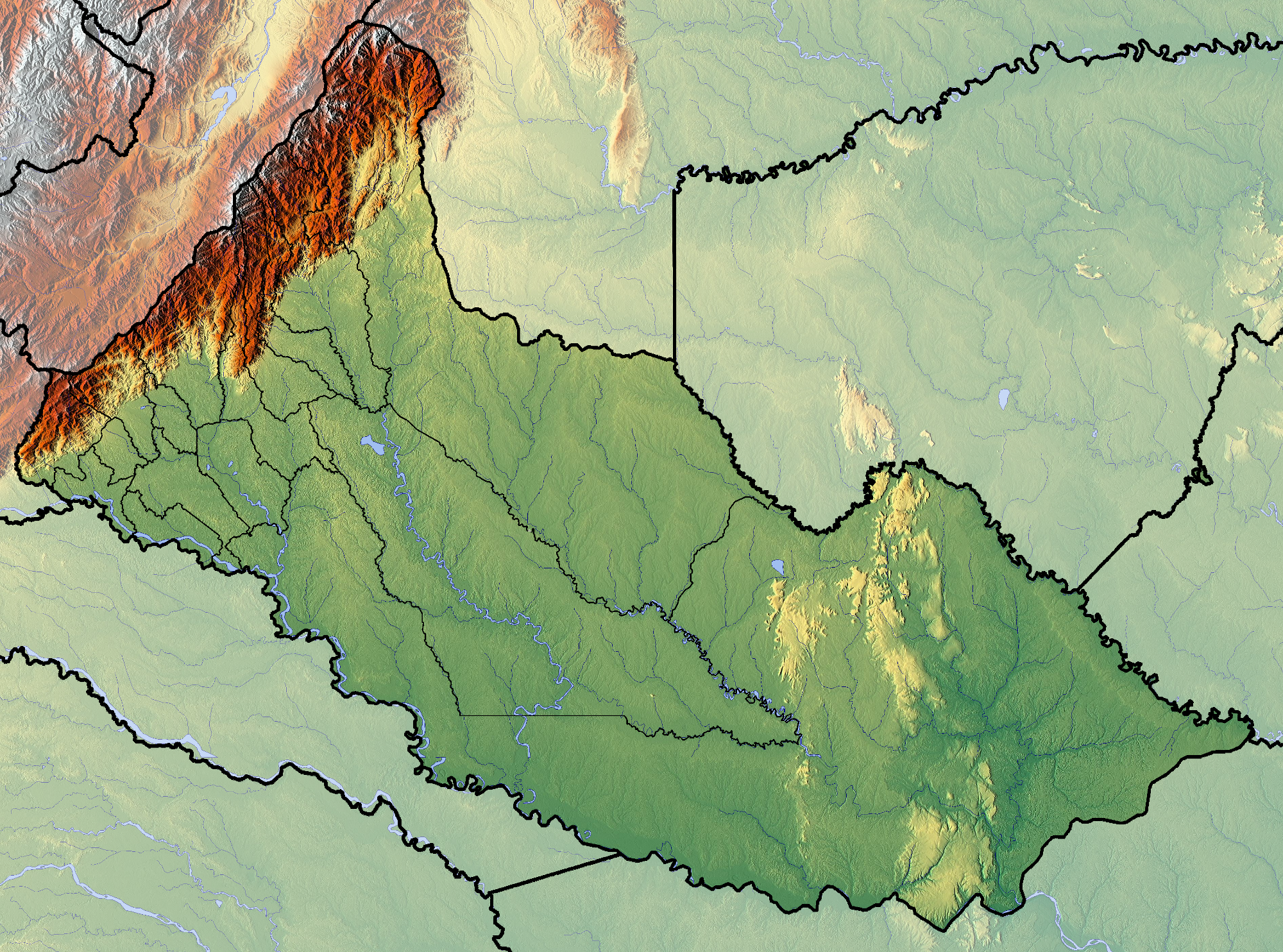
- Topography of the department
- Coordinates: 1°36′55″N 75°36′52″W
- Country: Colombia
- Region: Amazon natural region
- Department: 1981
- Intendancy: 1905
- Capital: Florencia

Government
  - Governor: Luis Francisco Ruiz Aguilar (since 2024)

Area
  - Total: 88,965 km^{2} (34,350 sq mi)
  - Rank: 3rd

Population (2018)
  - Total: 401,849
  - Rank: 24th
  - Density: 4.5169/km^{2} (11.699/sq mi)
- Demonym(s): Caqueteño; Caqueteñan

GDP
  - Total: COP 5,461 billion (US$ 1.3 billion)
- Time zone: UTC-05
- ISO 3166 code: CO-CAQ
- Municipalities: 15
- HDI: 0.737 high · 28th of 33
- Website: caqueta.gov.co

Caquetá Department (Spanish pronunciation: [kakeˈta]) is one of the 32 departments of Colombia. It is located within the country's Amazon natural region and the Amazon rainforest. Its capital is the city of Florencia.

== History ==
In the pre-Columbian era, the department was occupied by indigenous groups, mainly the Andaquí, Koreguaje, Tama and Macaguaje peoples.

After La Violencia (1948–1958), many migrants from other areas of the country moved to Caquetá, attracted by the vast amount of unclaimed public lands.

Caquetá was established as a department in 1981.^{:3} Starting in the 1980s, Caquetá Department was a hot spot in the Colombian conflict, with an economy dependent on the coca trade and large areas being under control of guerilla or drug trafficking groups. La Montañita in particular was a stronghold for armed groups such as the Revolutionary Armed Forces of Colombia (FARC).

On 21 December 2009, then Governor of Caquetá Department Luis Francisco Cuellar was kidnapped after a shoot out with his security; after a number of hours of military searches, his body was found with his throat slit.

Following the 2016 peace agreement with FARC, all of Caquetá's municipalities were designated as Territorial Approach Development Program (PDET) territories. The program was created to improve the conditions in the municipalities most impoverished and effected by the conflict.

== Geography and nature ==
Located in the Amazon natural region, Caquetá borders the departments of Cauca and Huila to the west, the department of Meta to the north, the department of Guaviare to the northeast, the department of Vaupés to the east, and the departments of Amazonas and Putumayo to the south covering a total area of 88,965 square kilometres (34,350 sq mi), the third largest in the country. It composes 7.79% of the Colombia's territory and 22.9% of the Colombian Amazon basin. The Japurá River, known in Colombia as the Caquetá River, is one of the bodies of water which flow through the department. Other bodies of water include the Orteguaza River.

The department has an equatorial superhumid (Afi) Köppen climate classification. A majority of the land is used for cattle farming.^{:2}

The department has over 120 species of birds.

Deforestation has severely impacted Caquetá, even within protected lands and indigenous territory, with forests often being destroyed to make room for cattle farming.

== Municipalities ==
There are 16 municipalities in Caquetá Department: Albania, Belén de Andaquies, Cartagena del Chairá, Curillo, El Doncello, El Paujil, Florencia, La Montañita, Milán, Morelia, Puerto Rico, San José del Fragua, San Vicente del Caguán, Solano, Solita, and Valparaíso. Its capital city is Florencia.

Map of municipalities in Caquetá Department.

== Demographics ==
Historical population
Year	Pop.	±%
1973	180,297	—
1985	264,507	+46.7%
1993	367,898	+39.1%
2005	420,337	+14.3%
2018	401,849	−4.4%

The total population of Caquetá department in the 2018 census was 401,849 people with a density of 4.46 people per square kilometer. In 2021, Caquetá's poverty rate was 44.8% according to the National Administrative Department of Statistics (DANE). Caquetá Department's Human Development Index was 0.708 in 2022.

The indigenous communities which inhabit the department include the Witoto, Coreguaje, Inga, Emberá, Pijao, Paez, and Guambiano peoples.

== Government ==
Like all departments in Colombia, Caquetá has a Governor and a Departmental Assembly.

Governors of Caquetá Department
Name	Party	Term	Election/Appointee	Ref.
Víctor Isidro Ramírez	MIRA	2012–2014	elected	
Julieta Gómez Bedoya (Note: Acting Governor)	Liberal	2014	Juan Manuel Santos	
Martha Liliana Agudelo Valencia	MIRA	2014–2016	Juan Manuel Santos	
Alvaro Pacheco Alvarez	Liberal	2016–2019	elected	
Fabio Augusto Parra Beltrán		2019	Iván Duque	
Martha Rocío Ruiz Arenas		2019–2020	Iván Duque	
Arnulfo Gasca Trujillo	Conservative	2020–2024	elected	
Luis Francisco Ruiz Aguilar	Coalition (CR, Ind)	2024–2027	elected	

== Symbols ==
The flag of Caquetá Department has seven horizontal stripes (four green and three white) and 16 yellow stars in a circle, with one in the center, in the top left corner against a white background. The green represents the dense forests found in the department.

The crest of Caquetá Department is divided into four quadrants, with a crown of feathers on top of it and a red ribbon below it. The crown of feathers is an example of a traditional indigenous attire worn by leaders during special ceremonies, it represents the department's indigenous history and communities.

== Gallery ==
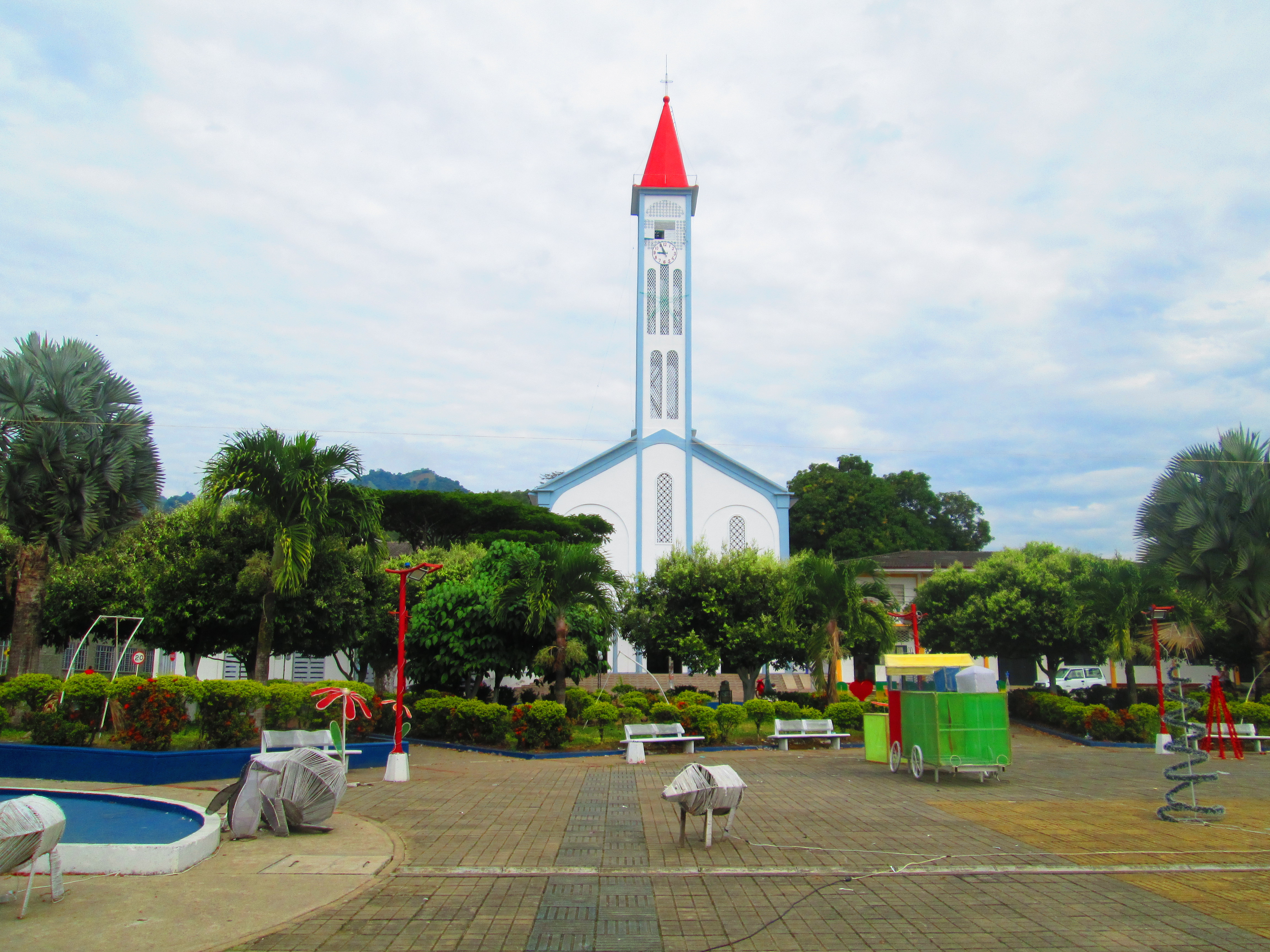
Church in El Doncello

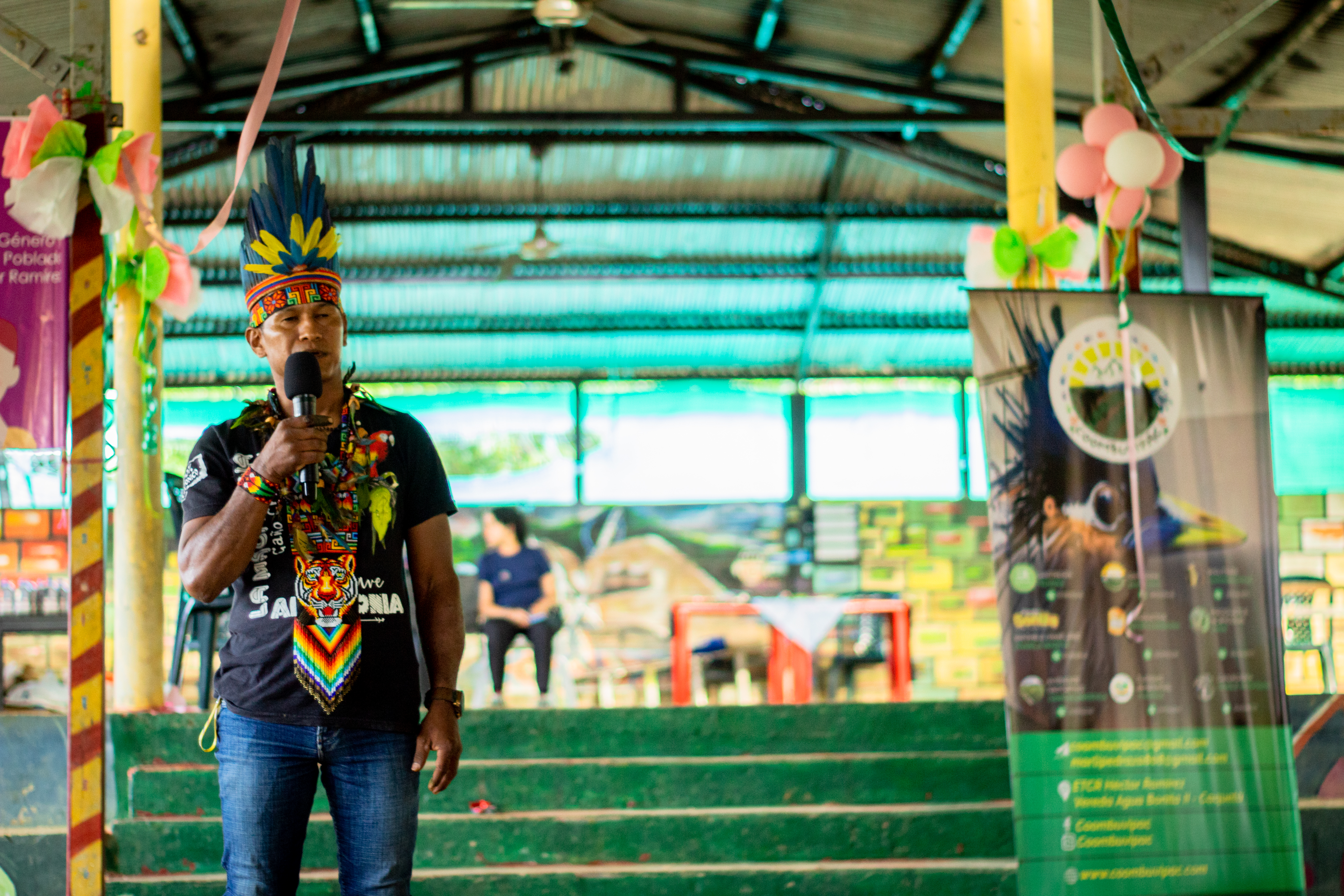
Indigenous man in Caquetá

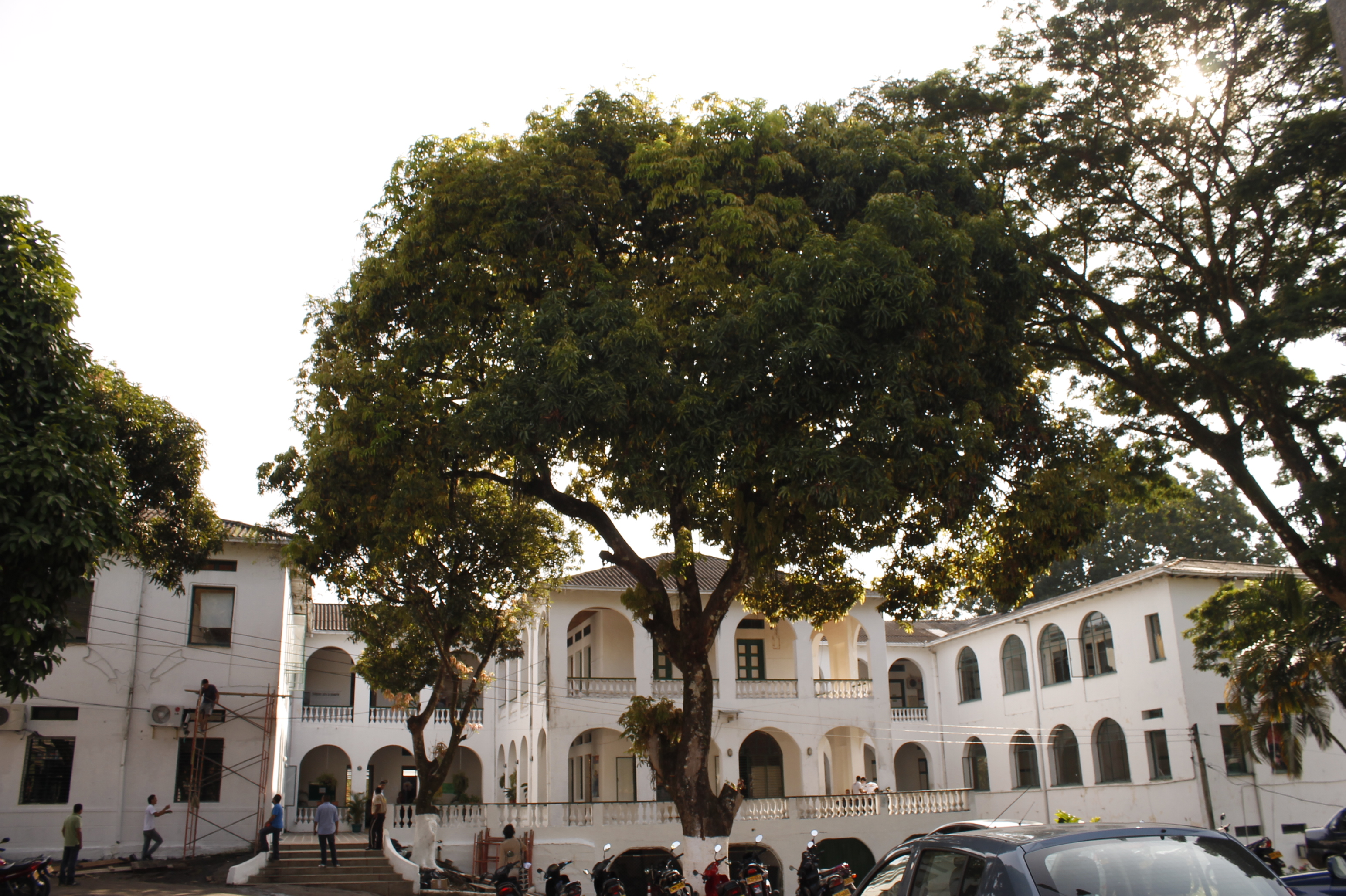
Edificio Curiplaya, a national monument located in Florencia

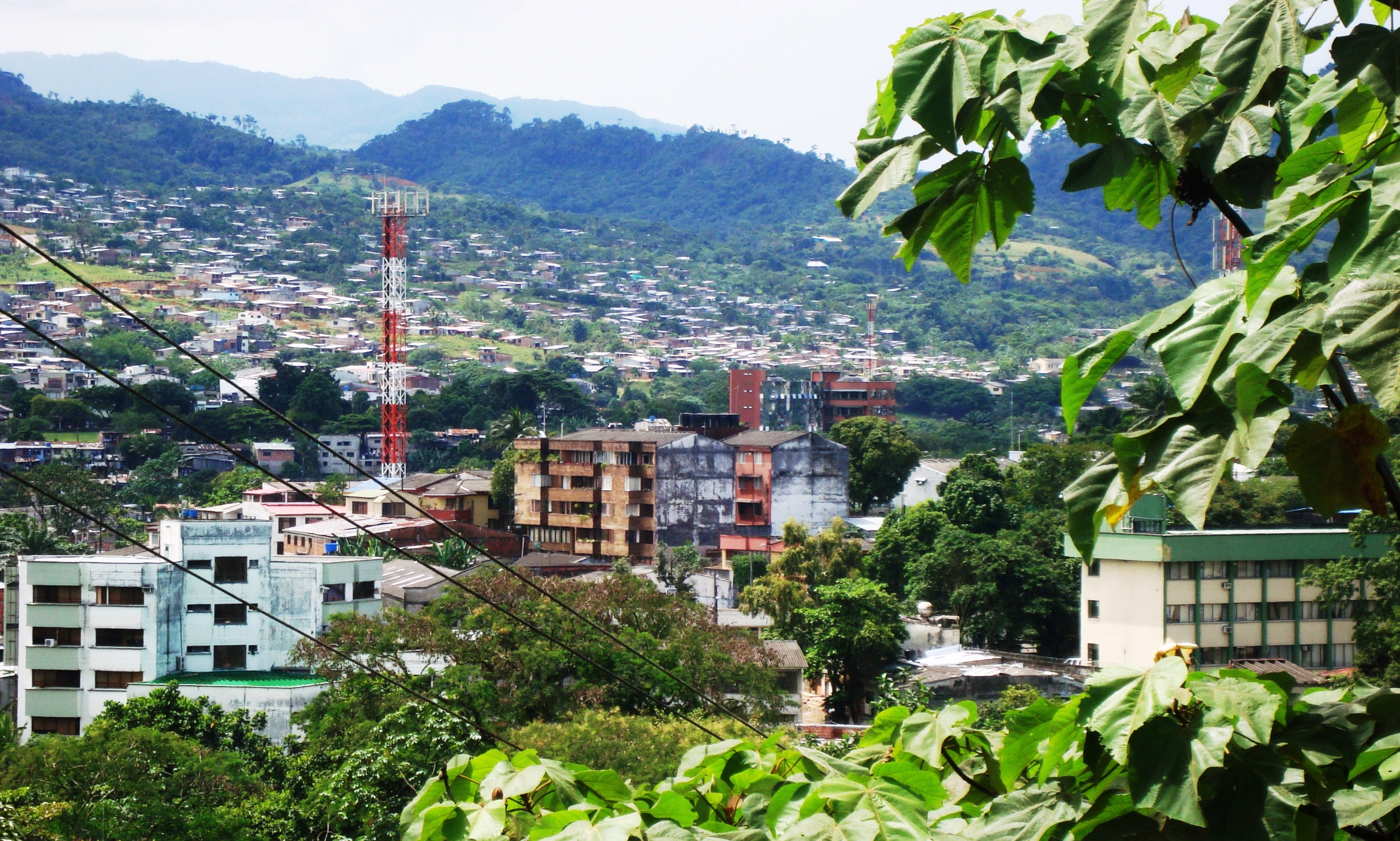
South-central Florencia

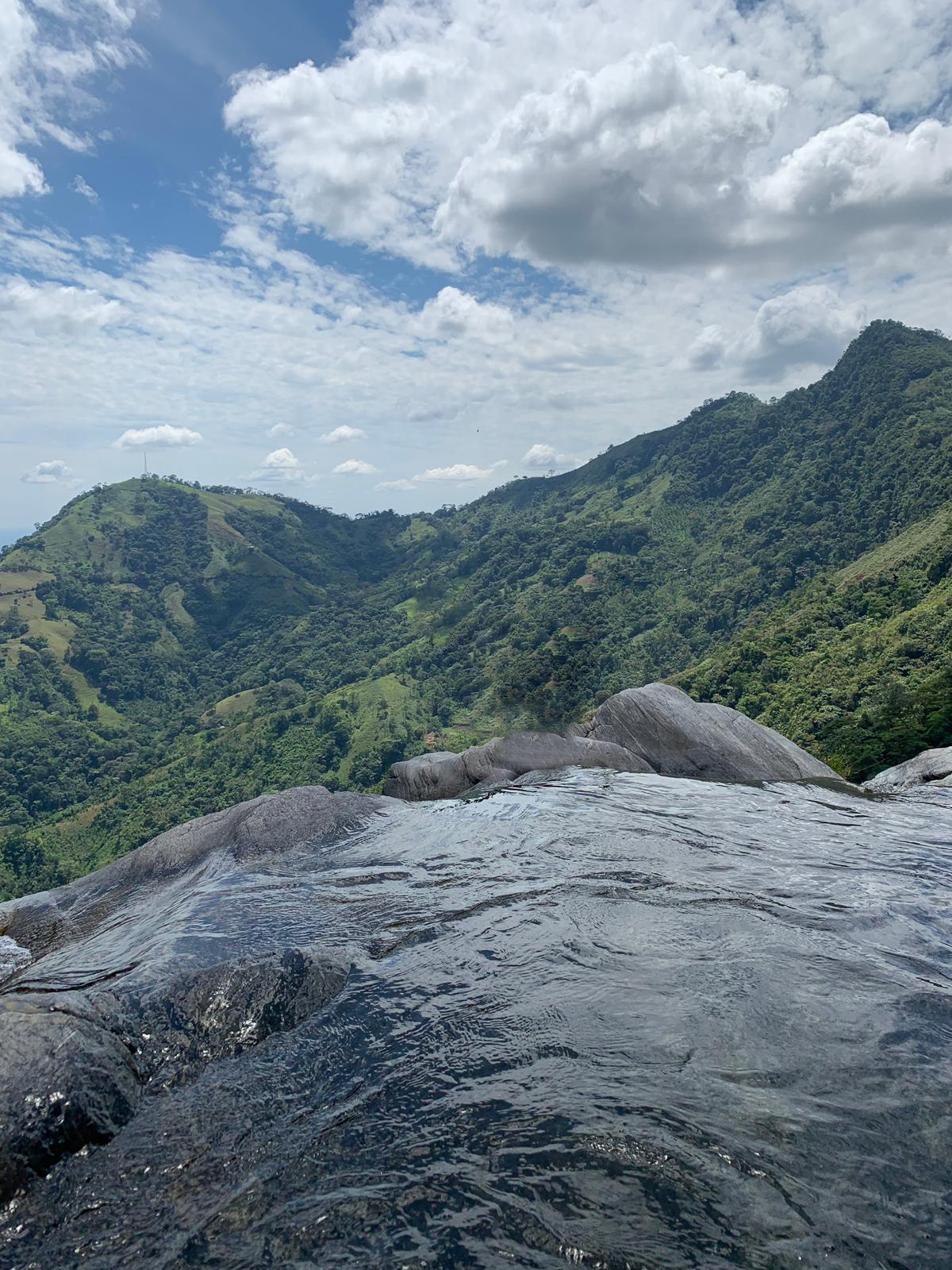
Cascada de Anayasita, a waterfall in El Doncello

== See also ==
- Caquetá Territory
