= Naya River =

Rivere in Colombia

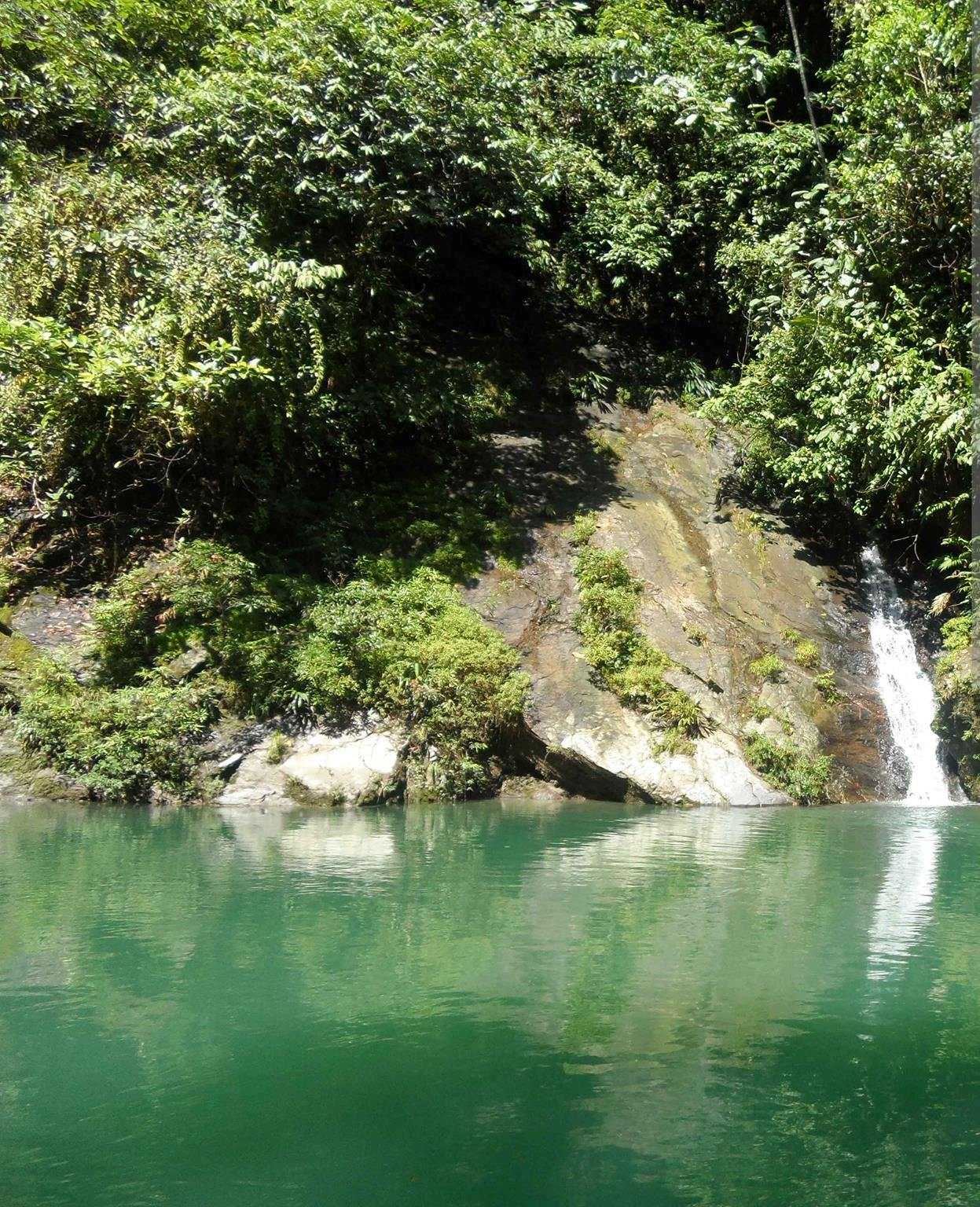
- Naya River

- Mouth location in Colombia
- Native name: Río Naya (Spanish)

Location
- Country: Colombia

Physical characteristics
- Mouth
  - location: Pacific Ocean
  - coordinates: 3°18′30″N 77°29′11″W
  - elevation: 0 m (0 ft)

The Naya River (Spanish: Río Naya) is a river in Colombia that flows into the Pacific Ocean.

The Naya forms the southern boundary of the Farallones de Cali National Park.

The river is 120 kilometres (75 mi) long, and is one of the main rivers of the Pacific slope and the Cauca The river rises in the Cerro Naya range, and runs through the municipality of Buenos Aires, Cauca. Lower down it serves as a boundary between the departments of Valle del Cauca and Cauca. The municipality of Buenaventura, Valle del Cauca is on its right bank, and the municipality of López de Micay, Cauca on its left bank. Tributaries include the Agua Clara river and the Canayero River. The river divides into two branches near the ocean, and forms Ají Island between its two mouths.

The mouth of the river has extensive stands of mangroves, part of the Esmeraldes-Pacific Colombia mangroves.

== See also ==
- List of rivers of Colombia

== Sources ==
- Carlos Borda, Northern South America: Northern Colombia, WWF: World Wide Fund for Nature
