= La Vega, Cauca =

La Vega
- Municipality and town
- Flag Coat of arms

- Location of the municipality and town of La Vega in the Cauca Department of Colombia
- Coordinates: 2°00′03″N 76°46′40″W
- Country: Colombia
- Department: Cauca Department

Population (2020 est.)
  - Total: 47,791
- Time zone: UTC-5 (Colombia Standard Time)
- Climate: Cfb

La Vega (Spanish pronunciation: [la ˈβeɣa]) is a town and municipality in the Cauca Department, Colombia.

== Geography ==
La Vega is located in the Cauca Department of Colombia, in the southern part of the department, at an elevation of 2,272 metres (7,454 ft) above sea level and approximately 104 km (65 mi) from Popayán. The municipality borders La Sierra to the north, San Sebastián and Almaguer to the south, Sotará and San Agustín in the Huila Department to the east, and Sucre to the west.
