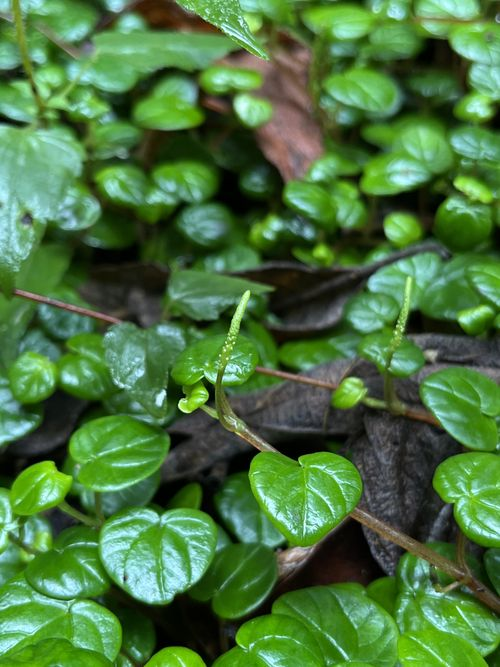

Scientific classification
- Kingdom: Plantae
- Clade: Embryophytes
- Clade: Tracheophytes
- Clade: Angiosperms
- Clade: Magnoliids
- Order: Piperales
- Family: Piperaceae
- Genus: Peperomia
- Species: P. ubate-susanensis

Binomial name
- Peperomia ubate-susanensis Yunck.

= Peperomia ubate-susanensis =

Species of herb

Peperomia vincentiana is a species of herb from the genus Peperomia. It was first described by Truman G. Yuncker and published in the book "London Journal of Botany 4: 415. 1845.". In Colombia, its elevation range is 2600 meters. Its etymology came from the Ubate-Susa highway in Cundinamarca.

== Distribution ==
It is endemic to Colombia.

- Colombia
  - Cundinamarca
    - Facatativá
    - Nemocón
    - Villa de San Diego de Ubaté
  - Cauca
    - La Vega
