= El Plateado =

Village in Colombia

- Populated center

- Location within Colombia
- Coordinates: 2.464556°N 77.240167°W
- Country: Colombia
- Department: Cauca
- Municipality: Argelia

Population
  - Total: 8,000 (2,015)

El Plateado is a populated center of Colombia in municipality of Argelia, department of Cauca. It is located within the Micay canyon on the Colombian Western Mountain Range at a distance of 207 km by road from the city of Popayán.

== History ==
Some documents indicate that in the past the district of Plateado was inhabited by the indigenous Guepies, Telembies and Barbacoas until the decade of 1940, a place where later settlers would arrive fleeing the violence unleashed in the country due to the assassination of the liberal leader Jorge Eliécer Gaitán; however, other versions affirm that although the time when the first mobilizations of settlers to territories of what is now the Municipality of Argelia occurred coincide with the period of violence unleashed in Colombia in 1948; colonization did not occur due to the effects of the bipartisan dispute between the liberal and conservative parties but rather due to the ambitious spirit of settlers. According to this other version, the origin of the El Plateado district is based on the adventure of Miguel Zapata, a man born in a region of El Bordo, Cauca Municipality called Guadualito, who in 1943, together with Felipe Rosero and Isaac Navia, began his adventure project. Residents of the area indicate that by approximately 1951, Miguel Zapata and others were already settled in the district, corroborating what was previously stated.

== Geography ==
The town of El Plateado is located within the Micay River Canyon, which is actually a deep gorge carved by the Micay River over millions of years, characterized by steep slopes, sometimes with a gradient greater than 60° and narrow V-shaped valleys; the Micay River flows at the bottom of the e canyon guided by major fault systems, particularly the NW-SE trending Micay Fault, forming impressive rapids and waterfalls along its course. These geological formations are a visual spectacle and a draw for adventure lovers. The Micay River Basin exhibits significant geological and morphological features shaped by tectonic activity, volcanic processes, and sedimentation and its geology includes basalts, ultrabasic rocks, and Quaternary volcanic deposits.

== Weather ==
The Micay River basin is part of the larger San Juan de Micay basin. It is one of the sub-basins within the Pacific Macrobasin The Micay River basin, like other areas in the Pacific Macrobasin, experiences high levels of precipitation, with some areas receiving between 2000 and 7000 mm/year. The region presents a significant variety of climates given its altitudinal variation from the coast to the watershed of the western mountain range.

Among the warm climates, the climates are characterized by the Warm Very Humid and Warm Pluvial climates, which together occupy 48.87% of the basin, as is typical of the Pacific lowlands. These climates are found in the alluvial plains of the Micay River to the foothills of the western mountain range, at altitudes below 800 m and temperatures above 24 °C.

Among the temperate climates, the Dry Temperate and the Very Humid Temperate climates account for 31.88%. These are located, naturally, at altitudes ranging from 800 to 1,800 m, with temperatures between 18 and 24 °C and rainfall between 1,000 and 2,000 mm/year for the first case and 3,000 and 7,000 mm/year for the second. These climates are characteristic of the municipalities of Argelia and El Tambo.

Ascending the Western Cordillera, the Cold Humid and Cold Very Humid climates are found, which account for 17.02% of the basin, at altitudes ranging from 1,800 to 2,800 m, with temperatures between 12 and 18 °C and rainfall of 2,000 and 3,000 mm/year and 3,000 and 7,000 mm/year, respectively. These are part of the climate diversity of the municipalities of Argelia and El Tambo.

Continuing the ascent, very cold climates appear, among which are the Very Cold Humid climate and the Very Cold Very Humid climate, which together occupy 2.23% within the basin, as can be seen in Table 30. These climates are typical of altitudes between 2800 and 3700 m, temperatures that vary from 6 to 12 °C and precipitation 2000–3000 mm/year and 3000–7000 mm/year. They occur within the basin in the municipalities of Argelia and El Tambo.

== Coca economy and violence ==
Several studies have explored the link between coca cultivation, illegal economies, and violence in El Plateado. For instance: A study titled "Economía de la coca y violencia: realidades desde el El Plateado, Municipio de Argelia, Cauca (Colombia)" examines how coca cultivation has fueled violence and shaped local dynamics. The same study highlights the role of illegal armed groups in controlling coca production and the resulting humanitarian challenges for the community

== Armed conflict and displacement ==
El Plateado has been a hotspot for clashes between guerrilla groups, dissidents of the FARC, and state forces. Reports indicate: The presence of the Estado Mayor Central, one of the largest FARC dissident groups, has made El Plateado a strategic location for illegal activities.

== Government and social programs ==
Efforts to address the region's challenges have included social programs and military operations: A case study evaluates the implementation of social policies, such as the Familias en Acción program, aimed at improving livelihoods and reducing poverty in El Plateado. Military operations, like those mentioned in "La comunidad de El Plateado, Cauca, vuelve a estar conectada," have sought to clear landmines and reduce risks from explosive devices.

== Rural and urban dynamics ==
The rural and urban areas of El Plateado face distinct challenges due to the presence of non-state armed groups: Reports highlight how various non-state armed groups(Grupos Armados No Estatales: GANE) operate in the region, creating an environment of risk and insecurity. Specific veredas (rural districts), such as Hueco, are mentioned as focal points for these dynamics

== Transportation ==
Land transportation in the region of the Micay River Basin and Canyon consists of earth roads and bridleways designed at the beginning of the twentieth century. However, despite this lack of infrastructure, El Plateado is a transport hub between the villages of the Pacific Coast and the towns on the east side of the Western Cordillera. One example is a bridleway that connects El Plateado with the towns of San Juan del Mechengue, Lopez de Micay and SantaCruz de Sugui and from this latter all the way to the plateau of Popayan. Additionally, from Lopez de Micay it is possible to travel by river up to the town of Timbiqui. Another bridleway connects El Plateado to Guapi through the following villages in this order: El Plateado, San Jose, Soledad, Calle Larga, El Partidero, Bonanza and Guapi. Lastly, there is an earth road that allows transportation using motor vehicles from El Plateado to Argelia which connects with the Panamerican Highway.
