= López de Micay =

- Municipality and town
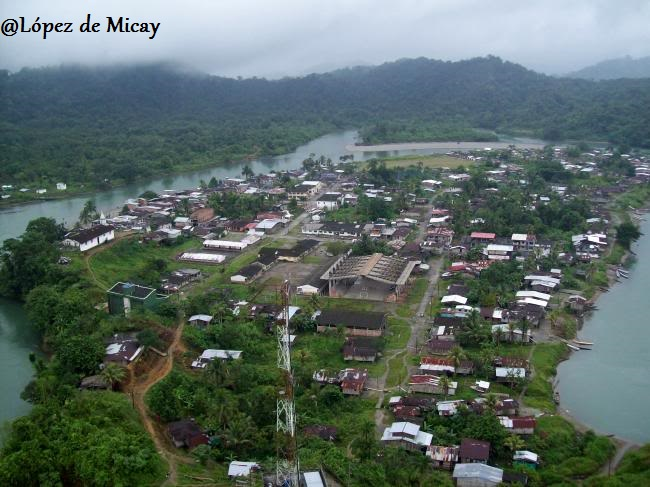
- View of López de Micay

- Flag Coat of arms

- Location of the municipality and town of López de Micay in the Cauca Department of Colombia.

- Location in Colombia
- Coordinates: 2°50′45.1″N 77°14′53″W
- Country: Colombia
- Department: Cauca Department

Population (Census 2018)
  - Total: 15,154
- Time zone: UTC-5 (Colombia Standard Time)
- Climate: Af

López de Micay (Spanish pronunciation: [ˈlopes ðe ˈmikaj]) is a town and municipality in the Cauca Department, Colombia. It is located on the Pacific Coast of the Cauca Department in the Naya Region on the foothills of the Colombian Western Cordillera. It is located 84 km (52 mi) from the departmental capital, Popayán.

== History ==
The first Spanish explorations in the region were carried out in 1525, when the conquistador Diego de Almagro discovered the San Juan de Micay River, and found it very difficult to settle any colony due to the inhospitable nature of the territory - flooded coasts, thick vegetation and indigenous tribes willing to defend their independent state. During the following years, Spanish ships from Panama raided, with the purpose of seizing indigenous' gold and taking many native slaves from the regions of the San Juan de Micay River, who would later pass as labor to the mines and colonial haciendas of the interior. The force labor decimated the indigenous population who by the end of the XVII century had become almost extinct and for this reason were replaced by African slave labor.

The current municipality of López de Micay was founded as a town in 1888 by Pancracio Riascos, Facundo Riascos and Luciano Alomía. Before being established as a municipality, it had several names, among them Arrieros del Micay, possibly due to its proximity to the El Chambón mining center, which connected this territory with Popayán along the road called Los Arrieros. Likewise, it has had several municipal seats, such as San José del Trapiche and San Francisco del Naya (today a district belonging to Buenaventura, Valle del Cauca). In 1911 the District of Zaragoza was created as part of the Province of Micay. Finally, in 1915 the settlement of Zaragoza was moved to the place now occupied by the town centre. The name results from the conjunction of the indigenous name given to the river and the posthumous tribute paid to General José Hilario López, who in 1851 ordered the liberation of the slaves. Currently, the municipality is called López de Micay and its urban center is called San Miguel de Micay.

== Geography ==
The municipality of López de Micay limits to the north with Buenaventura, to the south with Timbiquí and El Tambo, Cauca, to the east with Buenos Aires, Cauca, Suárez, Cauca and Morales, Cauca, and to the west with the Pacific Ocean. In its territorial conformation, two different physiographic zones are identified: the coastal zone and the Western Cordillera. The first includes a wide strip parallel to the coastline, influenced by the action of tides and river waters, and the second is located on the western side of the Western Cordillera, formed by a series of broken and steep reliefs. The territories that make up the municipality are characterized by the tendency to floods, avalanches, landslides and earthquakes. The main rivers, with their most representative tributaries and estuaries, are:

- Micay River Tributaries: Jolí, Chuare, Siguí, Gualala, Santa Barbara, Isla de Gallo, Iguana, Murciélago, Claudio, La Laguna, El Chachajo, El Trapiche, Arenal, Casa Vieja, Platanal and the streams of Hercilio, Tambor, Tambito and Yarumal.
- Naya River Tributaries: Agua Clara, Dos Quebrada, San Bartolo, Las Pavas, San Francisco, la Puerquera, La Sierpe, Tigre, Aurora and Guaduatito.

== Administrative divisions ==
The municipality is made up of the municipal seat and 34 corregimientos (hamlets) distributed along the Micay and Naya rivers.

=== Corregimientos along the Micay river ===
- San Antonio de Gurumendy
- Joli
- Brazo Siguí
- Santa Cruz de Singuí
- San Antonio de Chuare
- Playa Grande
- Naicioná
- San Isidro
- Taparal
- Zaragoza
- Guayabal
- Santa Ana
- Nahanamito
- El Trapiche
- Boca Grande
- El Coco
- La Capilla
- Ghiguero
- Calle Larga Micay

=== Corregimientos along the Naya river ===
- San Bernando*
- Batanía
- San Pedro de Naya
- El Trueno
- El Cacao
- Las Cruces
- Sangrada Familia
- Dos Quebradas
- San Bartolo
- Las Pavas
- La Concepción
- San Francisco Adentro
- Golondro
- Calle Larga Naya

== Demographics ==
79.1% of the population defined themselves as black, mulatto or Afro-Colombian, 8% did so as indigenous and the remaining 13% considered themselves mestizo. Internally, the indigenous community that inhabits the Municipality of López belongs to the Embera and Eperara Siapidara peoples. They have their own social structure and political-administrative organization, they are settled in five reservations on the banks of the Micay, Naya and Saija Rivers: Belén De Iguana Indigenous Reservation, Playa Bendita Indigenous Reservation, Isla De Mono Indigenous Reservation, Playita Indigenous Reservation and San Francisco La Vuelta, Rio Guangüi Indigenous Reservation. Likewise, there are six Community Councils duly organized and with their own dynamics within the territory: the Sanjoc Parte Alta Del Rio Micay Community Council, the Manglares del Rio Micay Community Council, the El Playón Del Rio Sigüí Community Council, the Río Chuare Integration Community Council, Mamuncia Community Council Middle Part of the Micay River and Naya River Community Council, which occupy the largest area of the municipal rural area. However, despite having clear legal recognition, there is no delimitation of the spaces between the Indigenous Reservations and the Community Councils, a situation that has not affected coexistence but that must be corrected during our administration. This form of occupation exposes the high level of rurality and the difficulties of connectivity and integration between the different local human settlements, as well as with the neighboring municipalities and the capital of the department, this being one of the main challenges to be addressed by the administration.

== Economy ==
The main economic activities in this municipality are agriculture, livestock, fishing, artisanal mining, forestry exploitation and commerce. Within agriculture, coconut, sugar cane, chontaduro, borojó, papachina and banana crops stand out, with some commercial potential. Likewise, it produces corn and bananas for local consumption, with low profit surpluses. Forest exploitation is practiced, especially mangroves, but without controls or sustainability of the wood resource. Livestock farming is also practiced in an incipient manner and without being able to cover the local market.

Fishing is very important activity, carried out in an artisanal manner for both self-subsistence and marketing with Buenaventura, with low levels of profit due to intermediation and transportation costs. Fishing for river shrimp and piangua is relevant in the area; However, mollusk fishing has been diminished due to the environmental impact of non-artisanal, expansive and uncontrolled gold extraction on the banks of the Micay River and its tributaries, as well as illegal collection through highly polluting methods such as using petroleum to fish in the mangroves.

Some studies indicate that oil deposits may possibly be found in this area, but no progress has been made in the exploration processes. In the same sense, reference is made to the possible existence of marble and lime deposits. Artisanal mining has been a historical economic activity in the area, specifically in the Chuare, Siguí and Micay rivers and some of its tributaries. However, due to the proliferation of mining companies with backhoes, this activity has been relegated.

== Climate ==
The Colombian meteorological service IDEAM reports an average annual precipitation of 12,168.9 mm (479.09 in), potentially making it the wettest inhabited place in the world; It is one of the wettest places on the Earth, with at least some amount of rain falling almost every day, with frequent downpours and torrential rain that causes flash flooding.

López de Micay has an extremely wet tropical rainforest climate (Köppen Af). The average temperature is 26.9 °C (80.4 °F).

Climate data for López de Micay
Month	Jan	Feb	Mar	Apr	May	Jun	Jul	Aug	Sep	Oct	Nov	Dec	Year
Mean daily maximum °C (°F)	31.3 (88.3)	31.9 (89.4)	32.1 (89.8)	31.7 (89.1)	31.6 (88.9)	31.5 (88.7)	32.0 (89.6)	32.0 (89.6)	31.7 (89.1)	30.8 (87.4)	30.6 (87.1)	30.9 (87.6)	31.5 (88.7)
Daily mean °C (°F)	26.8 (80.2)	27.1 (80.8)	27.2 (81.0)	27.1 (80.8)	27.1 (80.8)	26.8 (80.2)	26.9 (80.4)	27.0 (80.6)	27.0 (80.6)	26.7 (80.1)	26.5 (79.7)	26.5 (79.7)	26.9 (80.4)
Mean daily minimum °C (°F)	22.9 (73.2)	22.3 (72.1)	22.4 (72.3)	22.6 (72.7)	22.7 (72.9)	22.2 (72.0)	21.8 (71.2)	22.0 (71.6)	22.3 (72.1)	22.6 (72.7)	22.5 (72.5)	22.2 (72.0)	22.4 (72.3)
Average precipitation mm (inches)	973.9 (38.34)	779.8 (30.70)	876.8 (34.52)	1,074.6 (42.31)	1,106.8 (43.57)	991.6 (39.04)	861.0 (33.90)	897.2 (35.32)	1,063.8 (41.88)	1,191.6 (46.91)	1,184.3 (46.63)	1,167.5 (45.96)	12,168.9 (479.09)
Average precipitation days (≥ 1.0 mm)	25.5	21.9	23.3	24.9	26.4	25.3	25.2	25.5	25.9	27.0	26.3	28.0	305.3
Source 1:
Source 2: Instituto de Hidrologia Meteorologia y Estudios Ambientales (precipitation 1991-2020)
