= Sotará =

Sotará may refer to

- Sotará, Cauca, a town and municipality in Colombia
- Sotará (volcano), a volcano in Colombia
