= Timbío =

Coordinates: 2°20′40.37″N 76°41′02.18″W

Timbio, Cauca
- Municipality and town
- Flag Coat of arms

- Location of the municipality and town of Timbio, Cauca in the Cauca Department of Colombia.
- Country: Colombia
- Department: Cauca Department
- Founded: November 1, 1535

Government
  - Mayor: Libardo Vasquez Manzano

Area
  - Municipality and town: 180 km^{2} (69 sq mi)

Population (2015)
  - Municipality and town: 33,883
  - Density: 188.24/km^{2} (487.5/sq mi)
  - Urban: 13,269
- Time zone: UTC-5 (Colombia Standard Time)
- Climate: Cfb

Timbio is a town and municipality in the Cauca Department, Colombia. Timbio is a municipality located at a distance of 16 km south of Popayán, the department's capital city. The Hispanic foundation of Timbio took place on November 1, 1535, where Captains Juan de Ampudia and Pedro Añasco, following orders of Sebastian de Belalcázar, had build a church for the commemoration of the Christian holiday of ALL SAINTS, which was close to the site where the Spanish conquistadors defeated the people of Pubenza and Pambía in a battle at a site they named Mastales (today's Las Cruces) where they killed around 3,000 people. Timbio is the third oldest municipality in Colombia settled by the Spaniards.

== History of Timbío ==
The ancient inhabitants of Timbio were part of the Pubenza Confederation. The pubenenses maintained a degree o local autonomy, as they obeyed the respective chiefs and had their own social, political, economic and cultural organization. At the arrivals of the Spanish Conquistadors, the Pubenenses, led by Chiefs Calucé and Payán, there was a defensive fortress on the lands of Pambio (today Las Cruces) from where they monitor movements of the hostile tribes from the south. It was at this fortress where they faced the troops of Juan de Ampudia. The Conquistadors invaded from the south of the country in a very violent manner killing and subduing many.

According to Spanish chronicler Juan de Castellanos, there was great resistance. From October 23 to 30, 1535 the Spanish slaughtered around 3,000 indigenous people who depended on the chieftains of Calicanto, Sachacoco, Timbio, Oabio, Talaga and Calucé. They were defeated because they had no other weapons but stones, arrow and sharp cutting clubs. After the victory, Ampudia collected a great amount of gold, and took the opportunity to found established Timbio as Spanish settlement on Friday, November 1, 1535, with the celebration of the first mass by his accompanying priest García Sánchez.

== Administrative Division ==
List of Veredas

- Alto de San José
- Antomoreno
- Barro Blanco
- Bellavista
- Buenos Aires
- Campo Alegre
- Camposano
- Cincodias
- Cristalares
- Cuchicama
- El Altillo
- El Altillo Alto
- El Boquerón
- El Descanso
- El Deshecho
- El Encenillo
- El Guayabal
- El Hato
- El Naranjal
- El Placer
- El Retiro
- El Tablón
- El Uvo
- Hato Nuevo
- Hato Viejo
- La Avanzada
- La Banda
- La Cabaña
- La Chorrera
- La Honda
- La Laguna
- La Marquesa
- La Martica
- La Rivera
- Las Cruces
- Las Cruces I
- Las Cruces II
- Las Huacas
- Las Piedras
- Las Yescas
- Los Robles
- Pan de Azúcar
- Porvenir
- Puente Real
- Quilichao
- Quintero
- Sachacoco
- Samboni
- Samboni Bajo
- San Pedrito
- San Pedrito
- San Pedro
- Santa María
- Siloé
- Tunurco
- Urubamba
