= El Bordo, Cauca =

Town in Colombia

Coordinates: 2.1142°N 76.9831°W

El Bordo is a town in Cauca Department in Colombia. It is the administrative centre of Patía municipality. At the most recent count it had 11 679 inhabitants.
