= Valle de Pubenza =

Valley in Colombia

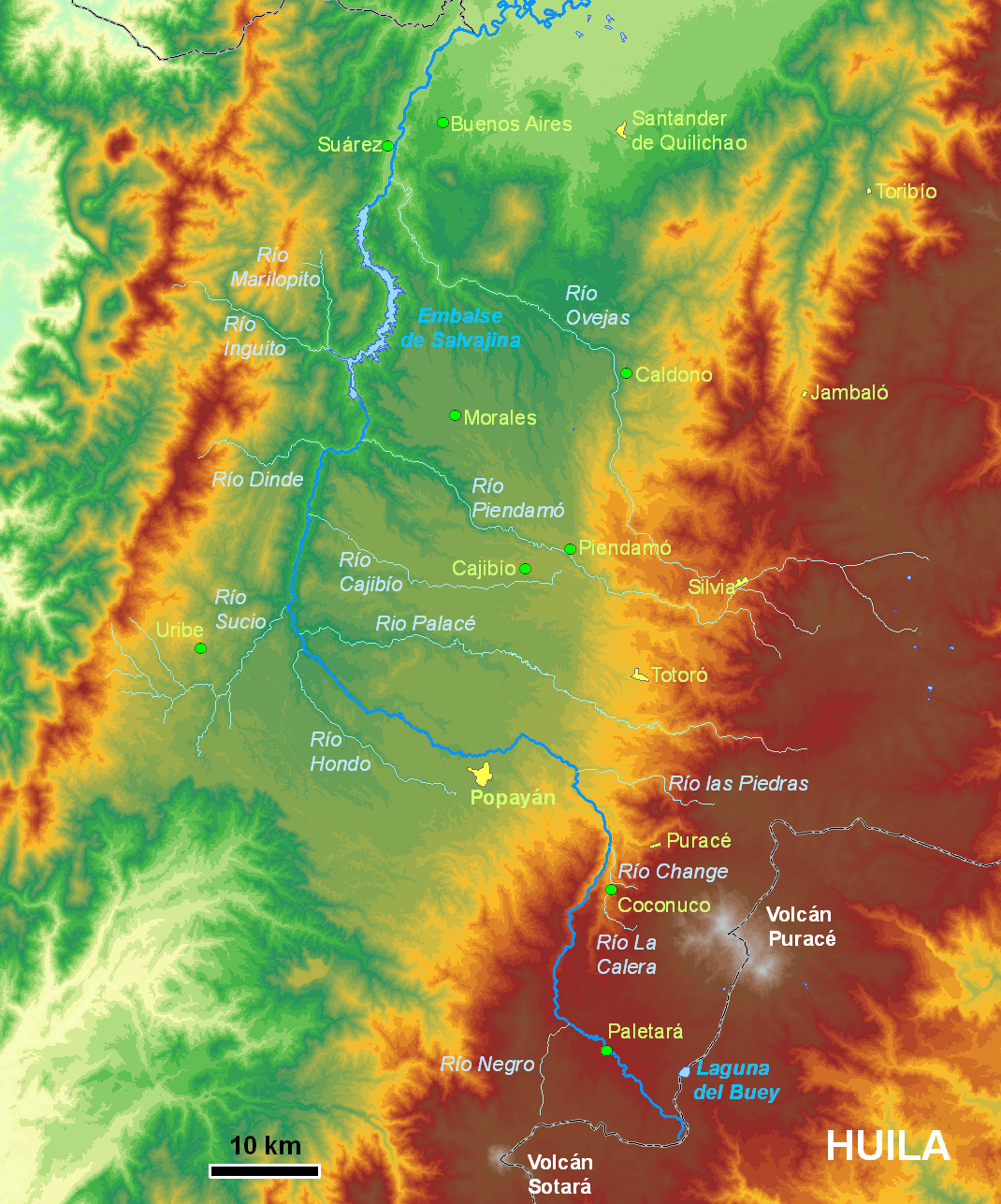
Valley of Pubenza and its delimiting mountain ranges

Valle de Pubenza (es: Pubenza Valley) is a high valley located between the central and eastern mountain ranges in southwestern Colombia and constitutes the hydrographic basin of the upper part of the Cauca River, which has its source in the Páramo de las Papas, pours tis water into the reservoir of Salvajina. The altitude of this valley ranges from 1,550 to 1,780 meters above sea level. and it has a landscape of undulating terrain with a varied relief that presents hills, ridges, steep hills as well as broken landscapes with ravines and canyons through which numerous rivers flow that feed the Cauca River. In terms of geographic area, Pubenza is among the eleven largest inter-Andean valleys in the country. The main city of the Pubenza Valley is Popayán, capital of the Cauca Department.

== Geology ==
The soils originate from igneous rocks and volcanic ash; they are strongly to very strongly acidic, high in aluminum saturation, light to moderate weathering, and low to moderate fertility. The climate is humid temperate. The average temperature is 27.9 °C, presents a bimodal rainfall regime, with an average annual rainfall of 2258 mm. The average number of rainy days per year fluctuates between 170 and 220 days, approximately, resulting in a relative humidity with values up to 72%.

== History ==
Upon the arrival of the Spanish Conquistadors, the Valley of Pubenza was inhabited by a confederation of ethnic groups that they called the "Guambiano Coconuco Confederation" or "Pubense Confederation", which established to defend against the siege of warrior groups and cannibals that surrounded the region, among which, in addition to others, were the Pijaos and Yaporongos to the east, the Patias and Bojoleos to the south, and the Petequíes to the north, and also from possible military incursions from the Inca on the south. According to tradition, the architect of this alliance was the great cacique Puben, and it was in his memory that the Valley of Pubenza and the inhabitants of the valley have been named.

== Economy and uses of the soil ==
The soil in the Pubenza Valley is used mainly for the cultivation of coffee, native pastures and natural forests. Coffee farming is one of the main lines of the economy of the Pubenza Valley and persists as a dominant element of the landscape in rural areas, however, the modernization in the management of coffee plantations that leads to the planting of high-yield varieties in total exposure to the sun, with greater requirements for synthetic agrochemicals, has led to higher production but at high environmental costs.
