= Patía, Cauca =

Coordinates: 2°10′N 77°05′W

Patia, Cauca
- Municipality and town
- Flag

- Location of the municipality and town of Patia, Cauca in the Cauca Department of Colombia.
- Country: Colombia
- Department: Cauca Department
- Elevation: 723 m (2,372 ft)

Population (2020 est.)
  - Total: 37,781
- Time zone: UTC-5 (Colombia Standard Time)
- Climate: Am

Patía is a Municipality located in Cauca Department, Colombia. The administrative centre of Patía is El Bordo.

Within the main touristic attractions of the region we can find Piedra Sentada: The Parador Patía, The Lerma Hill and Patía river that irrigates the valley of the same name. This river is the largest and abundant of the basin of the Sudamerican Pacific.

The Patía is located on Panamerican Road, about 82 kilometres or 51 miles south of Popayán, the department capital.

== History ==
The populated region of Patía Valley, was conformed since prehistoric period by Bojoles Indians, Chapa chugas, Sindaguas y Patias, leaving their vestige to disappear behind the forced work and the missions in the Indians doctrinaire chapels and after of slaves that made part of the social organization of the farm landowners, that nowadays are places of archeologic evidence.

The foundation of the towns in the Patía Valley were realized by the clergy; when Indian population was decimated, came the black spooks (black run off people) and released the farms and mines that were exploited along the Patía river Guachicono until Juananbu in the Nariño department, thus creating the towns — or palenques — of black people.

The myths created in this region tell that after they ran off with the idea of descrying their original Africa, the black spooks climbed the Manzanillo hill and when they did not see their ancestral land, they cried and cried, so much so that their tears formed a lake.

Today this foundational mythical place can be visited in the rock of the hill Manzanillo, from which springs permanently feed the riverbed of the Valerio ravine.

Within its task there was the extraction of gold with punts in the depression called The Hoyo, which are located Quilcacé river and Esmita, where nowadays is handmade exploit mines of coal.

== Geography ==
The Patía Valley is conformed by the municipalities of The Bordo, Patía, Mercaderes and the townships of Galindez, Mojarras and Pilón.

The central section of the Patía River flows through the Patía Valley dry forests ecoregion. The Patía valley is framed by the western and central ranges, where flows the Patía river from north to south that extends itself towards the Nariño department.

Located in the south of the Cauca department, the valley and the places that conform its whole thickness, are located approximately between 4 and 6 hours of the city Popayan. This place is located between the Guachicono, San Jorge and Mama Conde rivers, that converge in the Patía river. The Manzanillo hill safeguards every prairie of the valley.

The first of the municipalities that shapes the Patía valley, is the Patía, whose administrative centre is El Bordo.

Physical description: El Bordo, is located at 02° 06' 56" of north latitude and 76° 59' 21"of west length. Its height above sea level is 910 metres or 2,986 feet, and its mean annual temperature 23 °C or 73.4 °F. The municipality area is 732 square kilometres or 283 square miles.

Its limits are as follows: at north with the municipalities of The Tambo and The Sierra, at east with the municipalities of Bolívar and the Sierra, at south with Sucre and Mercaderes, and by the west with the municipalities of Balboa and Argelia.

The following townships are part of Patía: Tha Hoyo, The Fonda or Portugal, The Tallas, Mendez, Pan de Azúcar, Angulo, Bello Horizonte, Brisas, Santacruz, Don Alonso, The Estrecho, The Placer, The Puro, Galindez, The Mesa, Piedra Sentada and Santa Rosa Baja, totalling 755 square kilometres or 292 square miles.

Urban area: 22.24 square kilometres or 8.59 square miles

Rural area: 732.76 square kilometres or 282.92 square miles

Merchants:

Its limits are: At north with the municipalities of Patía and Balboa, at east with the municipality of Bolivar, at west with Nariño department and the municipalities of Leyva and the Rosario, and at the south with the municipality of Florencia and Nariño department, municipalities of Taminango, San Lorenzo and La Unión.

Has a total area of: 641.009 square kilometres or 247.49 square miles

Its height above sea level is 1,167 metres or 3,829 feet, and the mean temperature 22 °C or 71.6 °F.

== Climate ==
Climate data for Patía (Fonda La Citec), elevation 635 m (2,083 ft), (1981–2010)
| Month | Jan | Feb | Mar | Apr | May | Jun | Jul | Aug | Sep | Oct | Nov | Dec | Year |
|---|---|---|---|---|---|---|---|---|---|---|---|---|---|
| Mean daily maximum °C (°F) | 32.2 (90.0) | 32.8 (91.0) | 32.8 (91.0) | 32.5 (90.5) | 32.4 (90.3) | 32.9 (91.2) | 34.2 (93.6) | 35.4 (95.7) | 35.2 (95.4) | 33.0 (91.4) | 31.4 (88.5) | 31.4 (88.5) | 33.0 (91.4) |
| Daily mean °C (°F) | 26.0 (78.8) | 26.2 (79.2) | 26.2 (79.2) | 25.9 (78.6) | 25.9 (78.6) | 25.9 (78.6) | 26.7 (80.1) | 27.6 (81.7) | 27.4 (81.3) | 26.3 (79.3) | 25.6 (78.1) | 25.5 (77.9) | 26.3 (79.3) |
| Mean daily minimum °C (°F) | 20.7 (69.3) | 20.6 (69.1) | 20.7 (69.3) | 21.2 (70.2) | 20.9 (69.6) | 20.1 (68.2) | 18.0 (64.4) | 18.9 (66.0) | 19.0 (66.2) | 20.3 (68.5) | 20.7 (69.3) | 20.9 (69.6) | 20.1 (68.2) |
| Average precipitation mm (inches) | 172.1 (6.78) | 164.3 (6.47) | 197.4 (7.77) | 193.6 (7.62) | 167.3 (6.59) | 68.7 (2.70) | 38.0 (1.50) | 39.7 (1.56) | 113.4 (4.46) | 249.4 (9.82) | 263.6 (10.38) | 247.0 (9.72) | 1,914.5 (75.37) |
| Average precipitation days | 15 | 12 | 15 | 16 | 14 | 9 | 5 | 5 | 9 | 17 | 20 | 19 | 152 |
| Average relative humidity (%) | 77 | 77 | 77 | 79 | 78 | 77 | 68 | 63 | 66 | 74 | 79 | 79 | 74 |
| Mean monthly sunshine hours | 186.0 | 158.1 | 161.2 | 153.0 | 164.3 | 177.0 | 201.5 | 201.5 | 168.0 | 170.5 | 162.0 | 179.8 | 2,082.9 |
| Mean daily sunshine hours | 6.0 | 5.6 | 5.2 | 5.1 | 5.3 | 5.9 | 6.5 | 6.5 | 5.6 | 5.5 | 5.4 | 5.8 | 5.7 |
Source: Instituto de Hidrologia Meteorologia y Estudios Ambientales

== Directions to the Patía Valley ==
To get Valley Patia, the travellers must go across the municipalities of Timbio and Rosas, and traverse through townships including Piedrasentada and El Mango, until reaching the municipality of El Bordo. This is where what is know as Valley Patia begins. The route is continuous and in an approximate 30 minutes is reached at Valley Patia’s, totumo's koumis´ and watermelon's land. After Patía, Galindez and Pilón are found. Farther from both these places following on from the Panamerican highway is the township El Estrecho, where there is road which directs towards Balboa – Cauca this region is recognized popularly as “The Patia Balcony”. Here now taking place in Mojarras, it is possible to continue to the south, through the Nariño department, or to divert directionally to reach the Mercaderes – Cauca, which is the last station of the Patía Valley.

== Patía Valley Culture ==
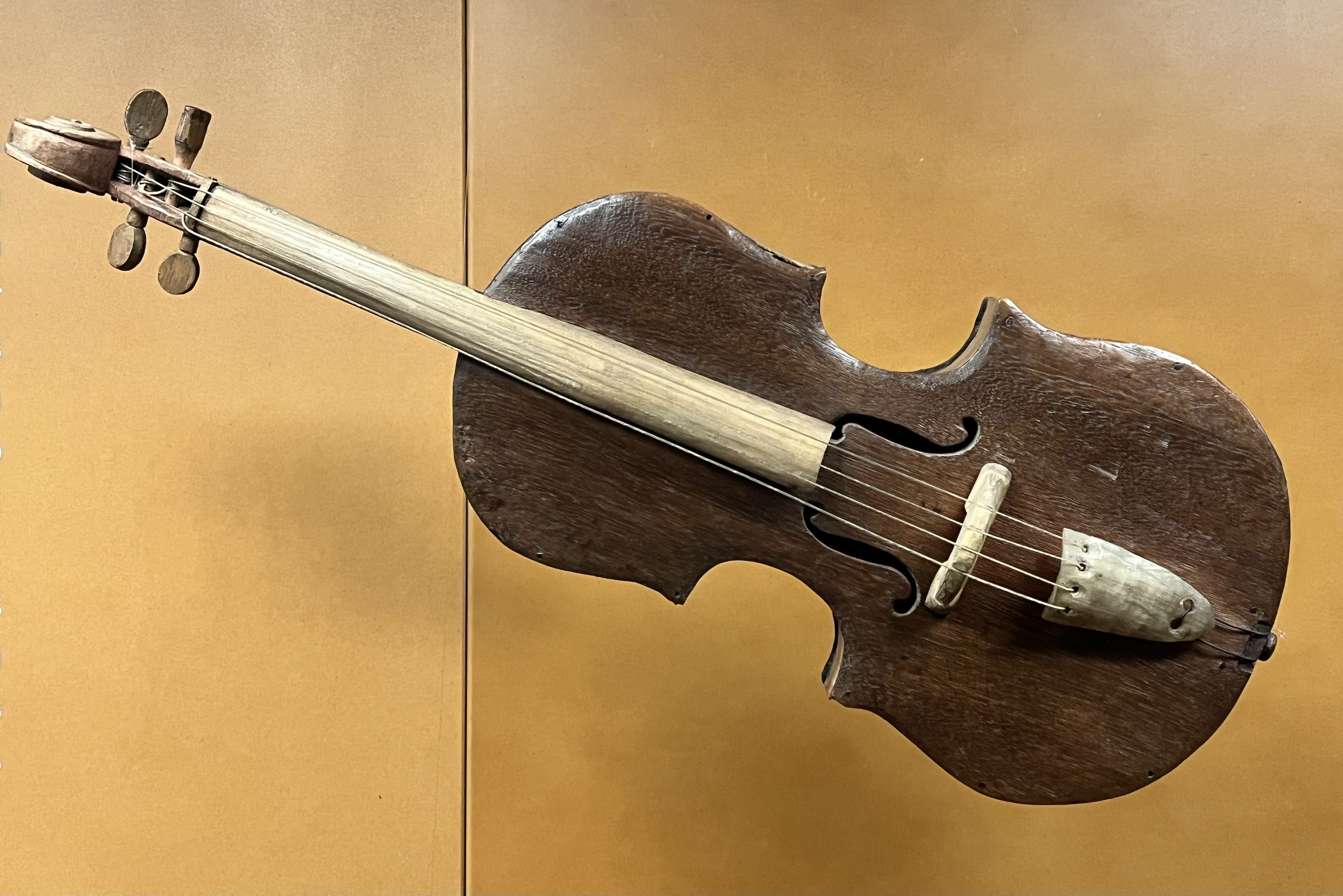
A 19th century violin from Patía in display at the Luis Ángel Arango Library in Bogotá, Colombia.

The culture of the whole region is based specifically in dance, the music and the theater. Their musical culture is one of the richest in the Cauca and Valle del Patia that became the cradle of Bambuco — not just classic but Patiano — The Patiano Bambuco, is a kind or better, a music system that plays, sings, dances and acts out. It moves in a rhythm of 6 / 8 in the minor mode, and recently in a major for the innovations of the new composers. Accompanied by string instruments like the violin and the guitars, are drums, percussions, and cununos. The texts sung slyly express their everyday lives, full of irony and critical to things that affect them. They reflect community events such as weddings, food, love relationships, satire to the government, health problems, personalities, community problems and death. Interpreted by the adult men, women, youth dances and children. It is also patiano because it is interpreted with native instruments like the violin patiano, charango and created based charrasca totumo fruit that occurs throughout the region and that is the basis of the economy of its inhabitants, Since their work is a collection of the work of "basic foodstuffs" who are mostly women to support her family.
