= Bolívar, Cauca =

Coordinates: 1.97083°N 76.9694°W

- Municipality and town
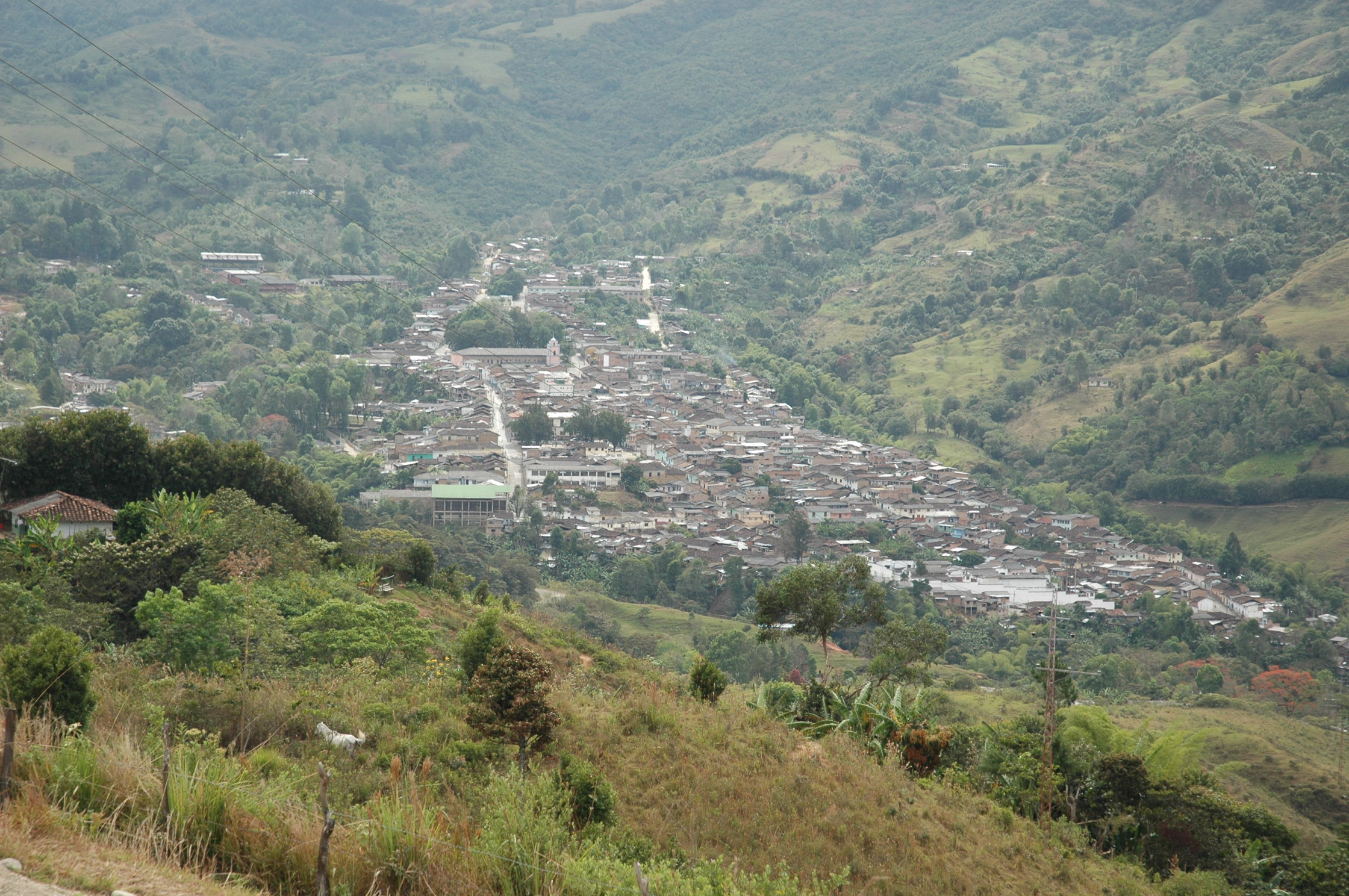
- View of Bolívar, Cauca

- Flag Coat of arms

- Location of the municipality and town of Bolívar, Cauca in the Cauca Department of Colombia.
- Country: Colombia
- Department: Cauca Department

Area
  - Total: 746.3 km^{2} (288.1 sq mi)
- Elevation: 1,777 m (5,830 ft)

Population (2020 est.)
  - Total: 44,864
- Time zone: UTC-5 (Colombia Standard Time)
- Climate: Aw

Bolívar is a town and municipality in the Cauca Department, Colombia. Founded in October 1784 by Domingo Belisario Gómez, the municipality covers an area of 746.3 km (464 mi) and has a population of 57,511. The population is primarily engaged in agriculture and ranching.

== Climate ==
Climate data for Bolívar, elevation 1,510 m (4,950 ft), (1981–2010)
Month	Jan	Feb	Mar	Apr	May	Jun	Jul	Aug	Sep	Oct	Nov	Dec	Year
Mean daily maximum °C (°F)	25.6 (78.1)	26.0 (78.8)	26.0 (78.8)	25.8 (78.4)	25.8 (78.4)	26.3 (79.3)	27.3 (81.1)	28.4 (83.1)	28.0 (82.4)	26.4 (79.5)	25.0 (77.0)	25.0 (77.0)	26.3 (79.3)
Daily mean °C (°F)	21.1 (70.0)	21.4 (70.5)	21.5 (70.7)	21.4 (70.5)	21.5 (70.7)	21.8 (71.2)	22.3 (72.1)	22.8 (73.0)	22.3 (72.1)	21.4 (70.5)	20.7 (69.3)	20.8 (69.4)	21.6 (70.9)
Mean daily minimum °C (°F)	17.7 (63.9)	17.8 (64.0)	17.9 (64.2)	17.9 (64.2)	17.9 (64.2)	17.8 (64.0)	17.9 (64.2)	18.1 (64.6)	17.7 (63.9)	17.5 (63.5)	17.3 (63.1)	17.5 (63.5)	17.8 (64.0)
Average precipitation mm (inches)	163.3 (6.43)	136.3 (5.37)	175.5 (6.91)	210.2 (8.28)	134.3 (5.29)	52.1 (2.05)	35.7 (1.41)	29.9 (1.18)	89.4 (3.52)	257.2 (10.13)	276.8 (10.90)	211.0 (8.31)	1,771.9 (69.76)
Average precipitation days	15	13	17	18	17	10	6	6	9	18	20	19	166
Average relative humidity (%)	80	79	79	81	80	73	67	62	70	78	84	83	77
Mean monthly sunshine hours	155.0	129.9	124.0	120.0	133.3	159.0	189.1	192.2	153.0	136.4	117.0	136.4	1,745.3
Mean daily sunshine hours	5.0	4.6	4.0	4.0	4.3	5.3	6.1	6.2	5.1	4.4	3.9	4.4	4.8
Source: Instituto de Hidrologia Meteorologia y Estudios Ambientales
