= Sickle of Minamá =

Colombian depression

Coordinates: 1.7446°N 77.5505°W

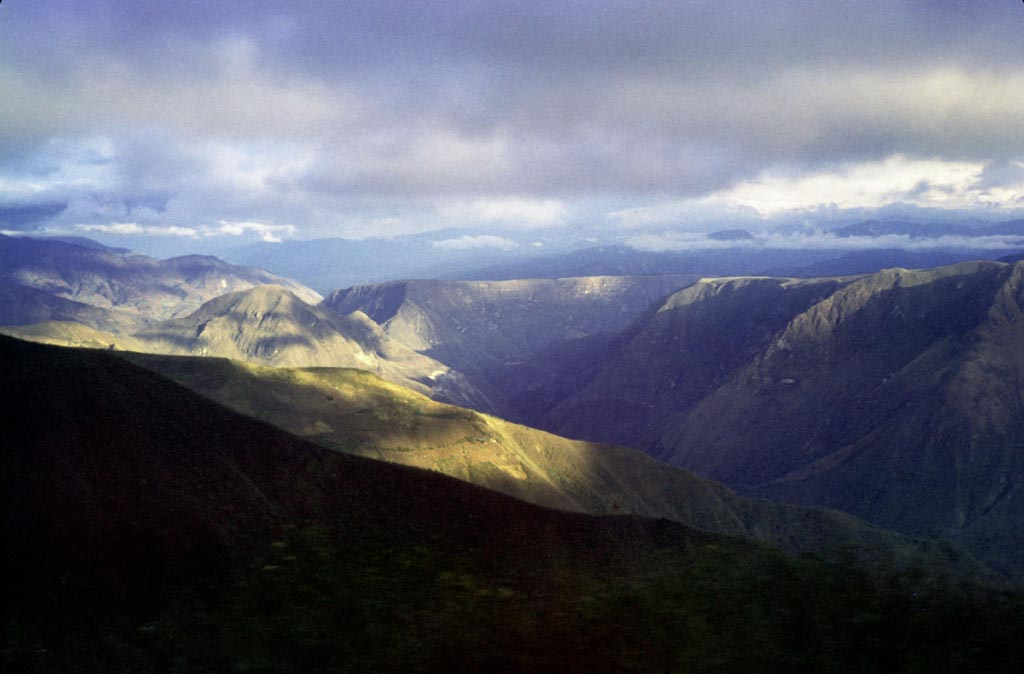
Sickle of Minamá.

The Sickle of Minamá (Spanish: Hoz de Minamá) is a deep depression located in southwestern Colombia, in the territories of the Nariño and Cauca Departments, created by the Patía River at its outlet to the Pacific Ocean, and is part of the upper valley Patía.

The Sickle of Minamá has a height of 380–400 meters above sea level, and is over 1 km deep and 60 km long, cutting from side to side of the Cordillera Occidental of Colombia.
