= Puerto Tejada =

Coordinates: 3°15′N 76°25′W

Puerto Tejada, Cauca
- Municipality and town
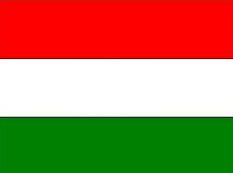
- Flag Coat of arms

- Location of the municipality and town of Puerto Tejada, Cauca in the Cauca Department of Colombia.
- Country: Colombia
- Department: Cauca Department

Area
  - Municipality and town: 101.1 km^{2} (39.0 sq mi)
  - Urban: 4.3 km^{2} (1.7 sq mi)

Population (2020 est.)
  - Municipality and town: 46,215
  - Density: 457.1/km^{2} (1,184/sq mi)
  - Urban: 35,821
  - Urban density: 8,300/km^{2} (22,000/sq mi)
- Time zone: UTC-5 (Colombia Standard Time)
- Climate: Am

Puerto Tejada (Spanish pronunciation: [ˈpweɾto teˈxaða]) is a town and municipality in the Cauca Department, Colombia.

== History ==
Puerto Tejada was officially made a town on September 17, 1897, in Monte Oscuro (Dark Mountain), named after General Manuel Tejada Sanchez. During the 18th and 19th centuries there had been uprisings of both black slaves and free blacks in the general area, and maroons had established settlements in Monte Oscuro, which provided great cover because of its dense tropical vegetation. After the abolition of slavery in 1852 the former slaves and the maroons' descendants established themselves as organized communities forming family farms that produced coffee, corn, plantain, cassava and cacao. They were joined by settlers and colonists from Antioquia, Valle and the rest of Cauca. There was a thriving agricultural economy at the end of the 19th century and the beginning of the 20th century.

Its first inhabitants settled at the banks of the Palo and Paila rivers. With the creation of the town, other towns surged around the area.

== Climate ==
Climate data for Puerto Tejada (Ing Bengala), elevation 1,000 m (3,300 ft), (1981–2010)
Month	Jan	Feb	Mar	Apr	May	Jun	Jul	Aug	Sep	Oct	Nov	Dec	Year
Mean daily maximum °C (°F)	30.0 (86.0)	30.3 (86.5)	30.2 (86.4)	29.6 (85.3)	29.6 (85.3)	29.7 (85.5)	30.2 (86.4)	30.6 (87.1)	30.3 (86.5)	29.5 (85.1)	29.2 (84.6)	29.5 (85.1)	29.9 (85.8)
Daily mean °C (°F)	24.1 (75.4)	24.2 (75.6)	24.1 (75.4)	23.9 (75.0)	24.0 (75.2)	24.0 (75.2)	24.2 (75.6)	24.3 (75.7)	24.1 (75.4)	23.9 (75.0)	23.8 (74.8)	23.9 (75.0)	24.0 (75.2)
Mean daily minimum °C (°F)	18.0 (64.4)	18.0 (64.4)	18.1 (64.6)	18.1 (64.6)	18.3 (64.9)	17.9 (64.2)	17.5 (63.5)	17.5 (63.5)	17.7 (63.9)	17.9 (64.2)	18.0 (64.4)	18.1 (64.6)	17.9 (64.2)
Average precipitation mm (inches)	96.8 (3.81)	94.6 (3.72)	144.7 (5.70)	203.6 (8.02)	147.7 (5.81)	87.3 (3.44)	47.0 (1.85)	43.0 (1.69)	97.4 (3.83)	147.5 (5.81)	166.7 (6.56)	113.5 (4.47)	1,389.7 (54.71)
Average precipitation days	10	9	14	16	16	10	8	8	12	16	16	12	144
Average relative humidity (%)	80	80	80	81	81	81	79	78	78	80	81	81	80
Source: Instituto de Hidrologia Meteorologia y Estudios Ambientales
