= Salvajina Dam =

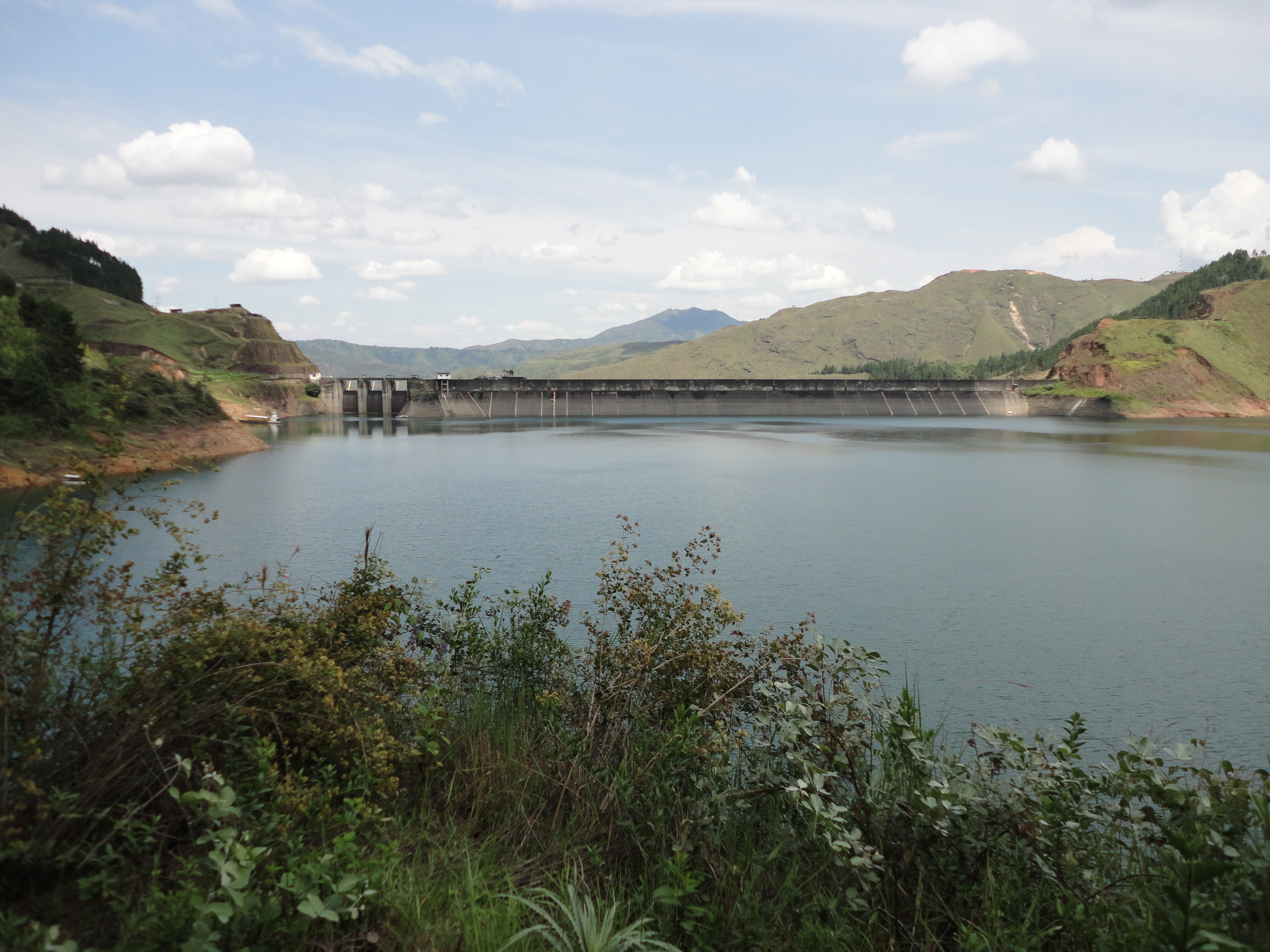
- Upstream side of dam and reservoir

- Location within Colombia
- Coordinates: 02°56′29″N 76°42′23″W

Dam and spillways
- Type of dam: Embankment, concrete-face rock-fill
- Height: 148 m (486 ft)
- Length: 400 m (1,300 ft)

Reservoir
- Creates: Salvajina Reservoir
- Total capacity: 764.7×10^{6} m^{3} (620,000 acre⋅ft)
- Active capacity: 695.7×10^{6} m^{3} (564,000 acre⋅ft)
- Inactive capacity: 69×10^{6} m^{3} (56,000 acre⋅ft)
- Maximum length: 26 km (16 mi)

Power Station
- Turbines: 3 x 90 MW (120,000 hp) Francis-type
- Installed capacity: 270 MW (360,000 hp)

The Salvajina Dam and hydroelectric plant are located in the Cauca River, corregimiento Buenos Aires, municipality Suarez, department Cauca in the southwest of Colombia. Its reservoir has a length of 31 kilometres (19 mi).

The dam was finished in September 1985 and has a power station with a 270 megawatts (360,000 hp) installed capacity. The purpose of the dam is flood control, electricity production, and drinking water supply for the city of Cali.

== Operators and owners ==
The regulation of water-quantities released with respect to the prevention of floods is managed by the Corporación autónoma regional del Valle del Cauca, CVC, which in case of disagreement has priority of decision. EPSA (Empresa de energía del Pacífico) has owned and operated the dam since shared by Colener S.A.S., Inversiones Argos S.A. y Banco de Inversión Bancolombia S.A

== Design ==
The dam is a 148 metres (486 ft) tall and 400 metres (1,300 ft) long concrete-face rock-fill embankment dam. Its reservoir has a capacity of 764.7×10^{6} m^{3} (619,952 acre⋅ft), while 695.7 million cubic metres (564,000 acre⋅ft) is active and 69 million cubic metres (56,000 acre⋅ft) is inactive space. The reservoir is 26 kilometres (16 mi) long and lies at a normal elevation of 1,155 metres (3,789 ft) above sea level. An intake tower conducts the water towards three 90 megawatts (120,000 hp) Francis turbines which combine for a 270 MW installed capacity. Each turbine has a maximum discharge of 116.5 cubic metres per second (4,110 cu ft/s) for a total power plant discharge of 349.5 cubic metres per second (12,340 cu ft/s). The dam was designed by Ingetec S.A.

== Criticism ==
There exist various accusations of national and international NGO's which mention violations of human rights as well as ecological debt in relation to the construction and management of the dam Salvajina. There are various sources mentioning displacement of the population that lived in the zone of the reservoir which range from 3,000 to 6,000. people, According to Biodiversidad en América Latina y El Caribe, people evicted from the reservoir were not properly compensated. According to the Tribunal Permanente de los Pueblos, the Colombian military and illegal paramilitary forces were used in order to displace the population. and the Campaña Prohibido Olvidar cites that protesters were harassed. A lawyer who accompanied the protestors, Oscar Elías López, was shot dead in a café in Cali.

== Literature ==
- Corporación Autónoma Regiónal del Valle del Cauca, CVC: Proyecto de Modelación del Río Cauca, Chapter 3.
