= Florencia, Cauca =

Coordinates: 1°40′56″N 77°04′20″W

Florencia
- Municipality and town
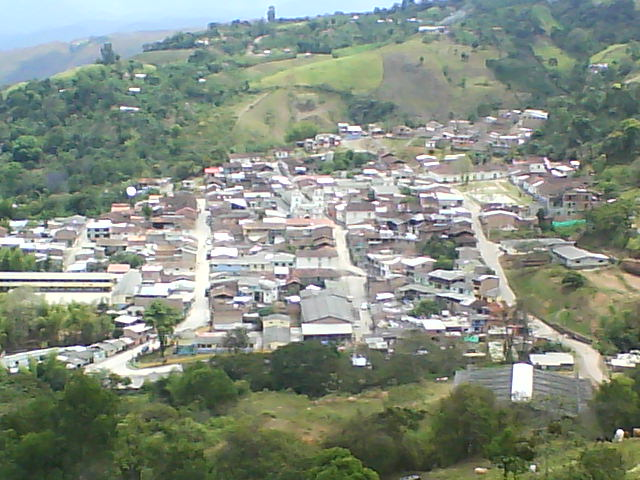

- Flag Seal

- Location of the municipality and town of Florencia in the Cauca Department of Colombia.
- Country: Colombia
- Department: Cauca Department

Area
  - Total: 56.2850 km^{2} (21.7318 sq mi)
- Elevation: 1,500 m (4,900 ft)

Population
  - Total: 6,028
- Time zone: UTC-5 (Colombia Standard Time)
- Climate: Aw
- Website: Official website

Florencia (Spanish pronunciation: [floˈɾensja]) is a town and municipality in the Cauca Department, Colombia.
