= Mercaderes, Cauca =

Coordinates: 1°48′N 77°10′W

- Municipality and town
- Flag Coat of arms

- Location of the municipality and town of Mercaderes, Cauca in the Cauca Department of Colombia.
- Country: Colombia
- Department: Cauca Department

Area
  - Total: 827 km^{2} (319 sq mi)

Population (Census 2018)
  - Total: 14,824
  - Density: 17.9/km^{2} (46.4/sq mi)
- Time zone: UTC-5 (Colombia Standard Time)
- Climate: Am

Mercaderes (Spanish pronunciation: [meɾkaˈðeɾes]) is a town and municipality in the Cauca Department, Colombia.

== Climate ==
Climate data for Mercaderes, elevation 1,174 m (3,852 ft), (1981–2010)
Month	Jan	Feb	Mar	Apr	May	Jun	Jul	Aug	Sep	Oct	Nov	Dec	Year
Mean daily maximum °C (°F)	28.0 (82.4)	28.5 (83.3)	28.3 (82.9)	28.1 (82.6)	27.8 (82.0)	28.6 (83.5)	29.9 (85.8)	30.8 (87.4)	30.2 (86.4)	28.6 (83.5)	27.0 (80.6)	26.9 (80.4)	28.6 (83.5)
Daily mean °C (°F)	22.6 (72.7)	22.8 (73.0)	22.9 (73.2)	22.8 (73.0)	22.7 (72.9)	23.0 (73.4)	23.5 (74.3)	24.0 (75.2)	23.6 (74.5)	22.7 (72.9)	22.1 (71.8)	22.2 (72.0)	22.9 (73.2)
Mean daily minimum °C (°F)	18.3 (64.9)	18.3 (64.9)	18.5 (65.3)	17.9 (64.2)	18.6 (65.5)	18.2 (64.8)	18.2 (64.8)	18.3 (64.9)	18.2 (64.8)	18.2 (64.8)	18.1 (64.6)	18.2 (64.8)	18.3 (64.9)
Average precipitation mm (inches)	101.6 (4.00)	90.8 (3.57)	156.7 (6.17)	180.6 (7.11)	146.5 (5.77)	75.4 (2.97)	39.6 (1.56)	42.0 (1.65)	94.8 (3.73)	204.2 (8.04)	212.2 (8.35)	159.2 (6.27)	1,503.5 (59.19)
Average precipitation days	15	13	17	19	18	13	9	8	10	19	20	18	176
Average relative humidity (%)	78	78	78	81	81	78	70	66	70	76	81	81	77
Mean monthly sunshine hours	170.5	144.0	145.7	138.0	145.7	162.0	195.3	195.3	168.0	161.2	144.0	151.9	1,921.6
Mean daily sunshine hours	5.5	5.1	4.7	4.6	4.7	5.4	6.3	6.3	5.6	5.2	4.8	4.9	5.3
Source: Instituto de Hidrologia Meteorologia y Estudios Ambientales

Climate data for Mercaderes (Gja Exp Univ Narin), elevation 580 m (1,900 ft), (1981–2010)
Month	Jan	Feb	Mar	Apr	May	Jun	Jul	Aug	Sep	Oct	Nov	Dec	Year
Mean daily maximum °C (°F)	32.9 (91.2)	33.1 (91.6)	32.9 (91.2)	32.5 (90.5)	32.6 (90.7)	33.2 (91.8)	34.6 (94.3)	35.2 (95.4)	35.1 (95.2)	33.5 (92.3)	31.5 (88.7)	31.7 (89.1)	33.2 (91.8)
Daily mean °C (°F)	26.0 (78.8)	26.3 (79.3)	26.2 (79.2)	26.1 (79.0)	26.2 (79.2)	26.3 (79.3)	26.6 (79.9)	26.9 (80.4)	26.5 (79.7)	25.9 (78.6)	25.3 (77.5)	25.5 (77.9)	26.1 (79.0)
Mean daily minimum °C (°F)	20.7 (69.3)	20.8 (69.4)	21.0 (69.8)	21.3 (70.3)	21.1 (70.0)	20.5 (68.9)	19.7 (67.5)	19.9 (67.8)	20.5 (68.9)	20.9 (69.6)	21.0 (69.8)	20.7 (69.3)	20.7 (69.3)
Average precipitation mm (inches)	79.8 (3.14)	95.9 (3.78)	143.6 (5.65)	141.3 (5.56)	111.1 (4.37)	49.0 (1.93)	24.5 (0.96)	23.4 (0.92)	50.5 (1.99)	168.2 (6.62)	190.9 (7.52)	151.7 (5.97)	1,194.6 (47.03)
Average precipitation days	9	9	11	12	11	6	4	3	6	13	16	14	110
Average relative humidity (%)	77	77	78	78	77	77	73	69	74	77	80	80	76
Source: Instituto de Hidrologia Meteorologia y Estudios Ambientales
