= Miranda, Cauca =

Coordinates: 3°15′N 76°15′W

Miranda
- Colombian municipality and town
- Flag Coat of arms

- Location of the municipality and town of Miranda, Cauca in the Cauca Department of Colombia.
- Country: Colombia
- Department: Cauca Department

Government
  - Alcalde: José Leonardo Valencia Narvaez (2016–2019)

Population (2020 est.)
  - Total: 43,333
- Time zone: UTC-5 (Colombia Standard Time)
- Climate: Aw

Miranda is a town and municipality in the Cauca Department, Colombia.

== History ==
It was on May 7, 1899, when Don Julio Fernández Medina founded the city, since then the community mixed among Afro-Descendant, Indigenous people, Mulattoes and from different regions have built one of the most prosperous towns in the department. Today Miranda has strengths in the agroindustrial field, and growth in the tourism sector, because the natural wealth framed in its rivers, makes natural spas suitable for national and foreign tourists. Precisely in this year – towards the month of October – the War of the Thousand Days broke out, that lived in the Municipality of Miranda, it was known with the name of Revolution of the Manigua, according to narration of the caloteño historian Mariano Sendoya.

== Climate ==
Climate data for Miranda, elevation 1,128 m (3,701 ft), (1981–2010)
Month	Jan	Feb	Mar	Apr	May	Jun	Jul	Aug	Sep	Oct	Nov	Dec	Year
Mean daily maximum °C (°F)	29.3 (84.7)	29.5 (85.1)	29.5 (85.1)	29.1 (84.4)	28.6 (83.5)	29.0 (84.2)	29.4 (84.9)	29.7 (85.5)	29.4 (84.9)	28.5 (83.3)	28.3 (82.9)	28.7 (83.7)	29.2 (84.6)
Daily mean °C (°F)	23.5 (74.3)	23.6 (74.5)	23.6 (74.5)	23.5 (74.3)	23.4 (74.1)	23.5 (74.3)	23.6 (74.5)	23.9 (75.0)	23.6 (74.5)	23.2 (73.8)	23.1 (73.6)	23.3 (73.9)	23.5 (74.3)
Mean daily minimum °C (°F)	18.1 (64.6)	18.2 (64.8)	18.3 (64.9)	18.3 (64.9)	18.4 (65.1)	18.2 (64.8)	17.9 (64.2)	18.1 (64.6)	18.1 (64.6)	18.0 (64.4)	18.0 (64.4)	18.1 (64.6)	18.1 (64.6)
Average precipitation mm (inches)	118.8 (4.68)	118.0 (4.65)	155.5 (6.12)	203.0 (7.99)	120.4 (4.74)	73.6 (2.90)	55.6 (2.19)	45.1 (1.78)	117.6 (4.63)	221.9 (8.74)	213.8 (8.42)	123.1 (4.85)	1,554.3 (61.19)
Average precipitation days	12	11	15	17	17	13	11	9	13	19	17	14	164
Average relative humidity (%)	84	83	83	84	84	83	81	80	82	83	83	83	83
Mean monthly sunshine hours	148.8	127.0	124.0	105.0	105.4	114.0	139.5	139.5	114.0	114.7	117.0	127.1	1,476
Mean daily sunshine hours	4.8	4.5	4.0	3.5	3.4	3.8	4.5	4.5	3.8	3.7	3.9	4.1	4.0
Source: Instituto de Hidrologia Meteorologia y Estudios Ambientales

Climate data for Miranda (Ing Cauca), elevation 1,000 m (3,300 ft), (1981–2010)
Month	Jan	Feb	Mar	Apr	May	Jun	Jul	Aug	Sep	Oct	Nov	Dec	Year
Mean daily maximum °C (°F)	30.0 (86.0)	30.3 (86.5)	30.3 (86.5)	29.6 (85.3)	29.4 (84.9)	29.6 (85.3)	29.9 (85.8)	30.3 (86.5)	30.1 (86.2)	29.4 (84.9)	29.0 (84.2)	29.4 (84.9)	29.8 (85.6)
Daily mean °C (°F)	23.6 (74.5)	23.7 (74.7)	23.6 (74.5)	23.4 (74.1)	23.4 (74.1)	23.5 (74.3)	23.6 (74.5)	23.8 (74.8)	23.5 (74.3)	23.2 (73.8)	22.9 (73.2)	23.3 (73.9)	23.5 (74.3)
Mean daily minimum °C (°F)	18.6 (65.5)	18.8 (65.8)	18.7 (65.7)	19.1 (66.4)	19.1 (66.4)	18.8 (65.8)	18.2 (64.8)	18.0 (64.4)	18.2 (64.8)	18.5 (65.3)	18.8 (65.8)	18.7 (65.7)	18.6 (65.5)
Average precipitation mm (inches)	98.2 (3.87)	102.6 (4.04)	143.6 (5.65)	206.6 (8.13)	158.1 (6.22)	101.3 (3.99)	71.6 (2.82)	67.3 (2.65)	123.7 (4.87)	182.1 (7.17)	182.6 (7.19)	113.3 (4.46)	1,518 (59.8)
Average precipitation days	10	11	14	17	16	12	9	9	12	17	16	13	150
Average relative humidity (%)	79	79	79	81	81	80	77	77	78	80	82	81	79
Mean monthly sunshine hours	167.4	149.6	145.7	132.0	136.4	138.0	161.2	164.3	138.0	145.7	144.0	151.9	1,774.2
Mean daily sunshine hours	5.4	5.3	4.7	4.4	4.4	4.6	5.2	5.3	4.6	4.7	4.8	4.9	4.9
Source: Instituto de Hidrologia Meteorologia y Estudios Ambientales
