= Nudo de los Pastos =

Orographic complex in Colombia and Ecuador

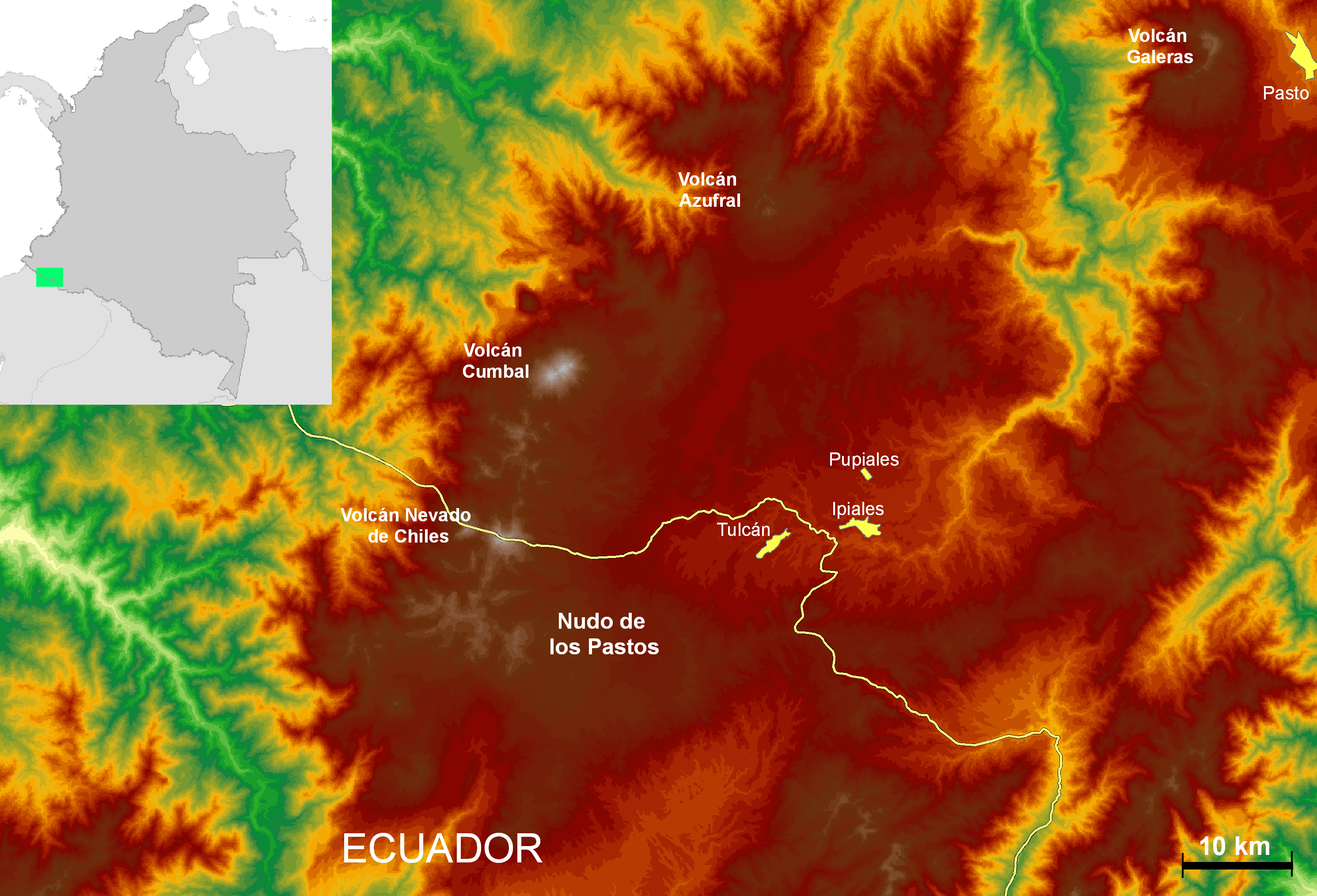
Detailed map of Nudo de los Pastos.

Nudo de los Pastos, in English meaning "Knot of the Pastos" or also known as the "Massif of Huaca", is an Andean orographic complex located in the Ecuadorian province of Carchi and the Colombian department of Nariño. It covers the intricate mountain region where the Andes split into two branches on entering Colombia: the Cordillera Occidental and the Cordillera Central.

Although there is no precise definition of the region of Nudos de los Pastos, it is generally considered to begin north of the rivers Chota and Apaqui and east of the rivers Cuasmal and Bishop and extends to the Sickle of Minamá in the Cordillera Occidental and to the Colombian Massif in the Cordillera Central, where this gives rise to the Cordillera Oriental.

In the Cordillera Occidental the taller heights are the volcanoes Chile (4,718 m), Cumbal (4,764 m) and Azufral (4,070 m). The Minamá Sickle is a deep depression created when the Patia River crosses the Cordillera Occidental on its way to the Pacific coast Nariño.

In the Cordillera Central there are the highlands Túquerres and Ipiales, Atriz Valley, volcanoes Galeras (4276 m) and Doña Juana (4,250 m), and the town of San Juan de Pasto and Cocha lagoon.

== Gallery ==
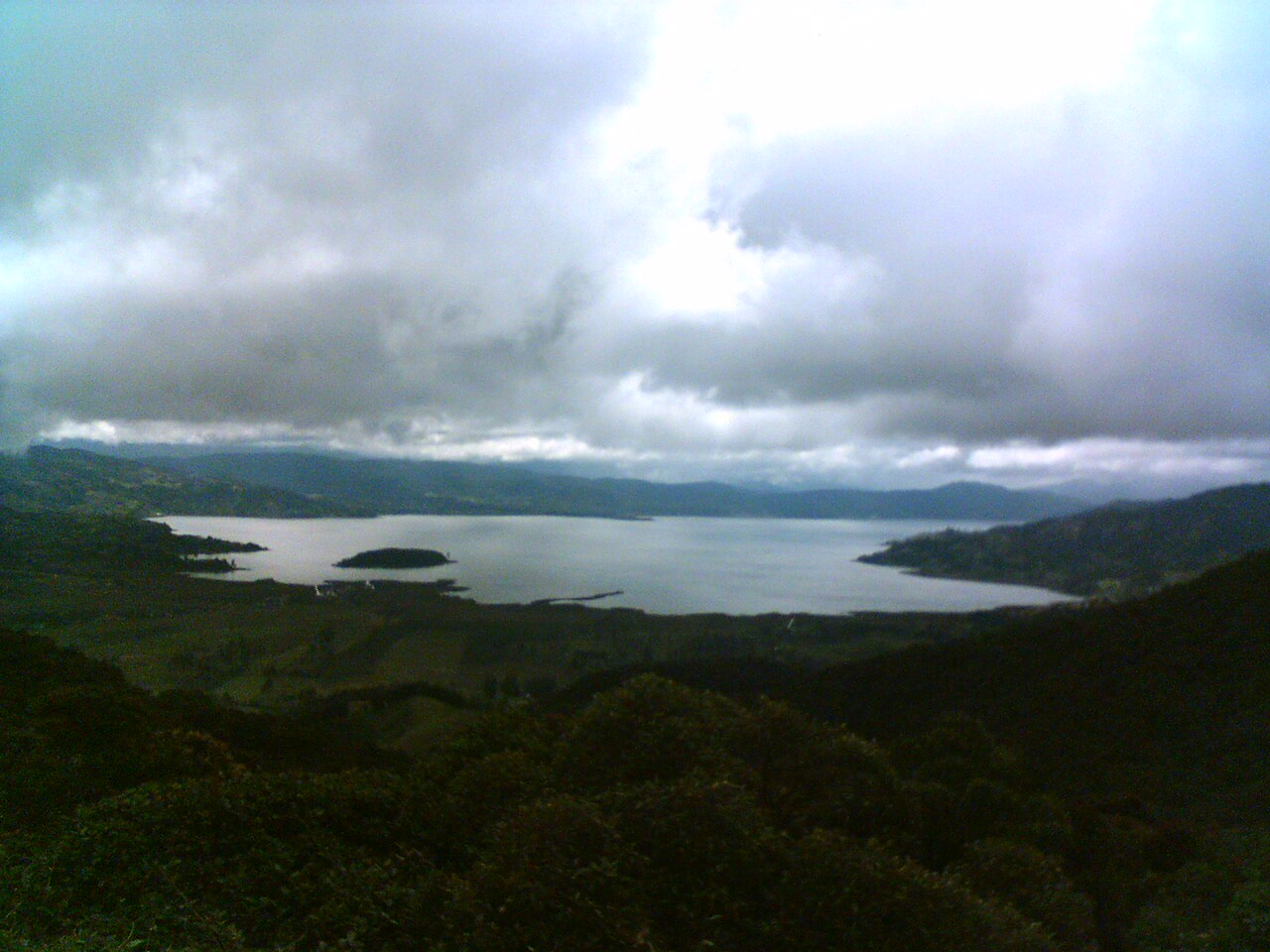
Laguna de la Cocha

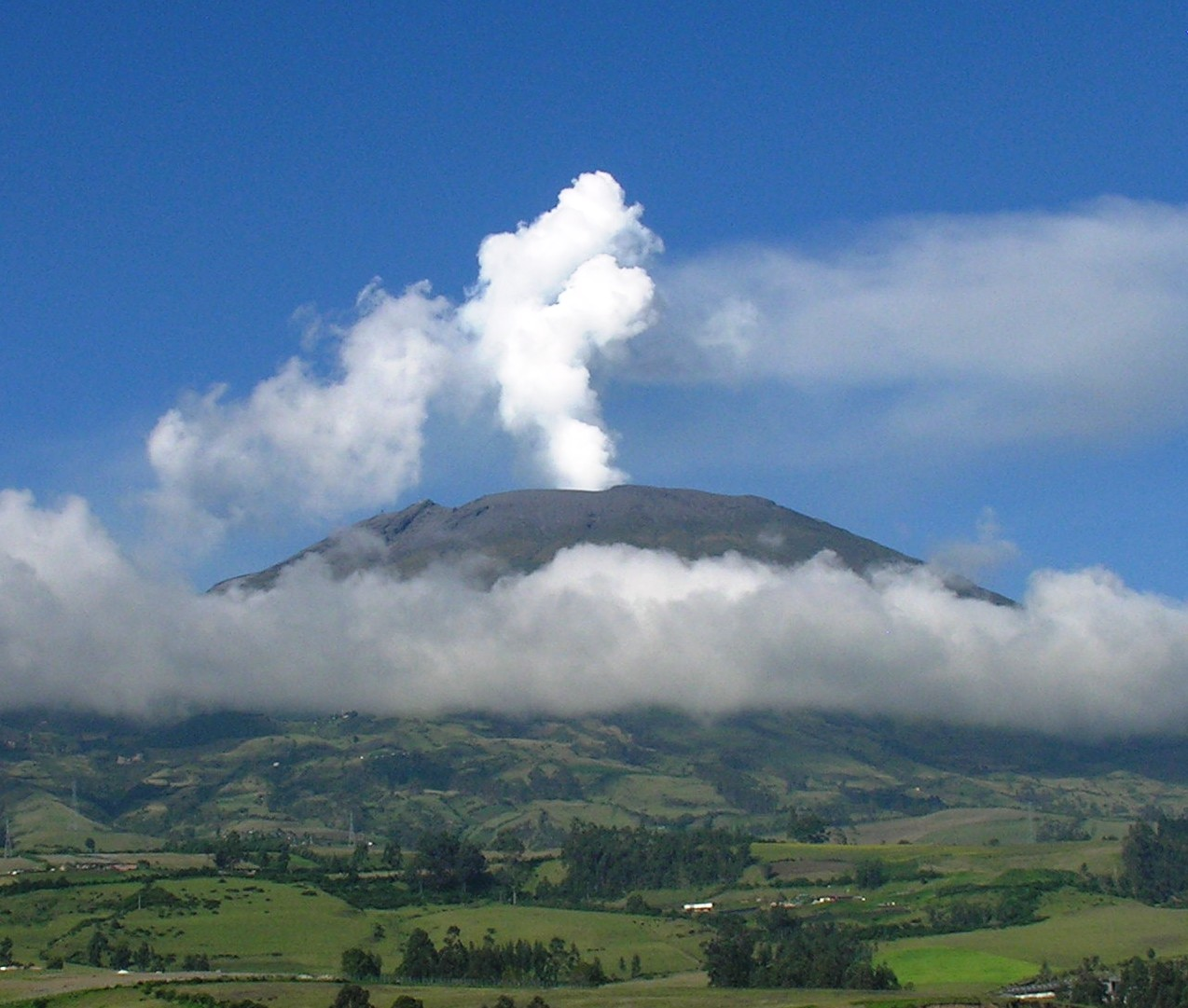
Galeras Volcano

== See also ==
- Pasto
