= Argelia, Cauca =

Argelia
- Municipality and town
- Flag Seal

- Location of the municipality and town of Argelia in the Cauca Department of Colombia.

- Location in Colombia
- Coordinates: 2°14′35″N 77°16′43″W
- Country: Colombia
- Department: Cauca Department

Area
  - Total: 713 km^{2} (275 sq mi)
- Elevation: 1,250 m (4,100 ft)

Population (Census 2018)
  - Total: 20,136
  - Density: 28.2/km^{2} (73.1/sq mi)
- Time zone: UTC-5 (Colombia Standard Time)
- Climate: Af
- Website: argelia-cauca.gov.co

Argelia is a town and municipality in the Cauca Department, Colombia. Founded by Order No. 02 on November 3, 1967, the municipality covers an area of 713 km^{2} and has a population of around 20,000. The population is primarily engaged in agriculture.

== Administrative divisions ==
The municipality of Argelia has the following corregimientos under its administration:

- Betania
- Bolivia
- El Diviso
- El Mango
- El Naranjal
- El Plateado
- El Sinai
- La Emboscada
- La Florida
- Las Belleza
- Puerto Rico
- San Juan Del
- Santa Clara
