= Sucre, Cauca =

Sucre
- Municipality and town
- Flag

- Location of the municipality of Sucre in the Cauca Department

- Location in Colombia
- Coordinates: 2°02′18″N 76°55′31″W
- Country: Colombia
- Department: Cauca Department
- Time zone: UTC-5 (Colombia Standard Time)

Sucre is a town and municipality in the Cauca Department, Colombia. It contains roughly 10,00 households. As of 2013, the municipality is frequently hit by FARC attacks.
