= Morales, Cauca =

Coordinates: 2.76028°N 76.6339°W

- Municipality and town
- Flag Coat of arms

- Location of the municipality and town of Morales, Cauca in the Cauca Department of Colombia.
- Country: Colombia
- Department: Cauca Department

Population (Census 2018)
  - Total: 29,737
- Time zone: UTC-5 (Colombia Standard Time)
- Climate: Af

Morales is a town and municipality in the Cauca Department, Colombia.
