= La Sierra, Cauca =

Coordinates: 2°15′N 76°50′W

- Municipality and town
- Flag Coat of arms

- Location of the municipality and town of La Sierra, Cauca in the Cauca Department of Colombia.
- Country: Colombia
- Department: Cauca Department

Area
  - Total: 217 km^{2} (84 sq mi)

Population (Census 2018)
  - Total: 9,935
  - Density: 45.8/km^{2} (119/sq mi)
- Time zone: UTC-5 (Colombia Standard Time)
- Climate: Cfb

La Sierra is a town and municipality in the Cauca Department, Colombia.

== Climate ==
La Sierra has a subtropical highland climate (Köppen Cfb) with pleasant mornings and warm afternoons year-round, accompanied by moderate to little rainfall from June to September and heavy to very heavy rainfall from October to May.

Climate data for La Sierra (Sierra La), elevation 1,870 m (6,140 ft), (1981–2010)
Month	Jan	Feb	Mar	Apr	May	Jun	Jul	Aug	Sep	Oct	Nov	Dec	Year
Mean daily maximum °C (°F)	21.8 (71.2)	22.0 (71.6)	22.1 (71.8)	21.9 (71.4)	22.1 (71.8)	22.2 (72.0)	22.9 (73.2)	23.6 (74.5)	23.7 (74.7)	22.6 (72.7)	21.4 (70.5)	21.2 (70.2)	22.3 (72.1)
Daily mean °C (°F)	17.5 (63.5)	17.8 (64.0)	17.9 (64.2)	17.8 (64.0)	18.0 (64.4)	18.1 (64.6)	18.3 (64.9)	18.7 (65.7)	18.6 (65.5)	17.9 (64.2)	17.3 (63.1)	17.3 (63.1)	17.9 (64.2)
Mean daily minimum °C (°F)	14.3 (57.7)	14.4 (57.9)	14.4 (57.9)	14.6 (58.3)	14.7 (58.5)	14.6 (58.3)	14.4 (57.9)	14.4 (57.9)	14.3 (57.7)	14.1 (57.4)	14.0 (57.2)	14.2 (57.6)	14.4 (57.9)
Average precipitation mm (inches)	296.7 (11.68)	201.4 (7.93)	233.8 (9.20)	225.6 (8.88)	182.7 (7.19)	76.6 (3.02)	39.6 (1.56)	41.4 (1.63)	106.1 (4.18)	309.9 (12.20)	399.0 (15.71)	372.2 (14.65)	2,485.1 (97.84)
Average precipitation days	19	16	20	22	21	15	9	9	12	22	24	24	214
Average relative humidity (%)	88	87	88	88	87	83	76	72	75	83	89	90	84
Mean monthly sunshine hours	133.3	110.1	108.5	99.0	111.6	135.0	164.3	170.5	132.0	114.7	99.0	114.7	1,492.7
Mean daily sunshine hours	4.3	3.9	3.5	3.3	3.6	4.5	5.3	5.5	4.4	3.7	3.3	3.7	4.1
Source: Instituto de Hidrologia Meteorologia y Estudios Ambientales
