= Sotará, Cauca =

Coordinates: 2°15′N 76°35′W

- Municipality and town
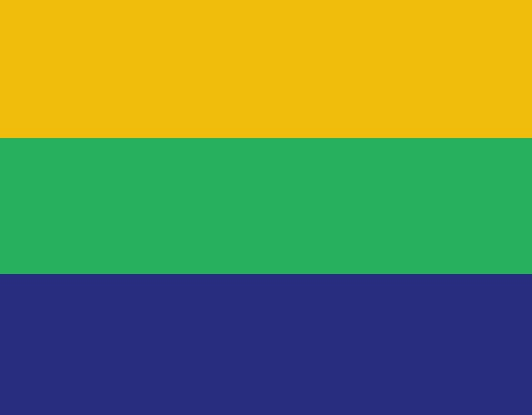
- Flag Coat of arms

- Location of the municipality and town of Sotara, Cauca in the Cauca Department of Colombia.
- Country: Colombia
- Department: Cauca Department

Area
  - Total: 574 km^{2} (222 sq mi)

Population (Census 2018)
  - Total: 11,958
  - Density: 20.8/km^{2} (54.0/sq mi)
- Time zone: UTC-5 (Colombia Standard Time)
- Climate: Cfb
- Website: http://sotara-cauca.gov.co/

Sotará is a town and municipality in the Cauca Department, Colombia.
