= Buenos Aires, Cauca =

Coordinates: 2°55′N 76°40′W

Buenos Aires
- Municipality and town
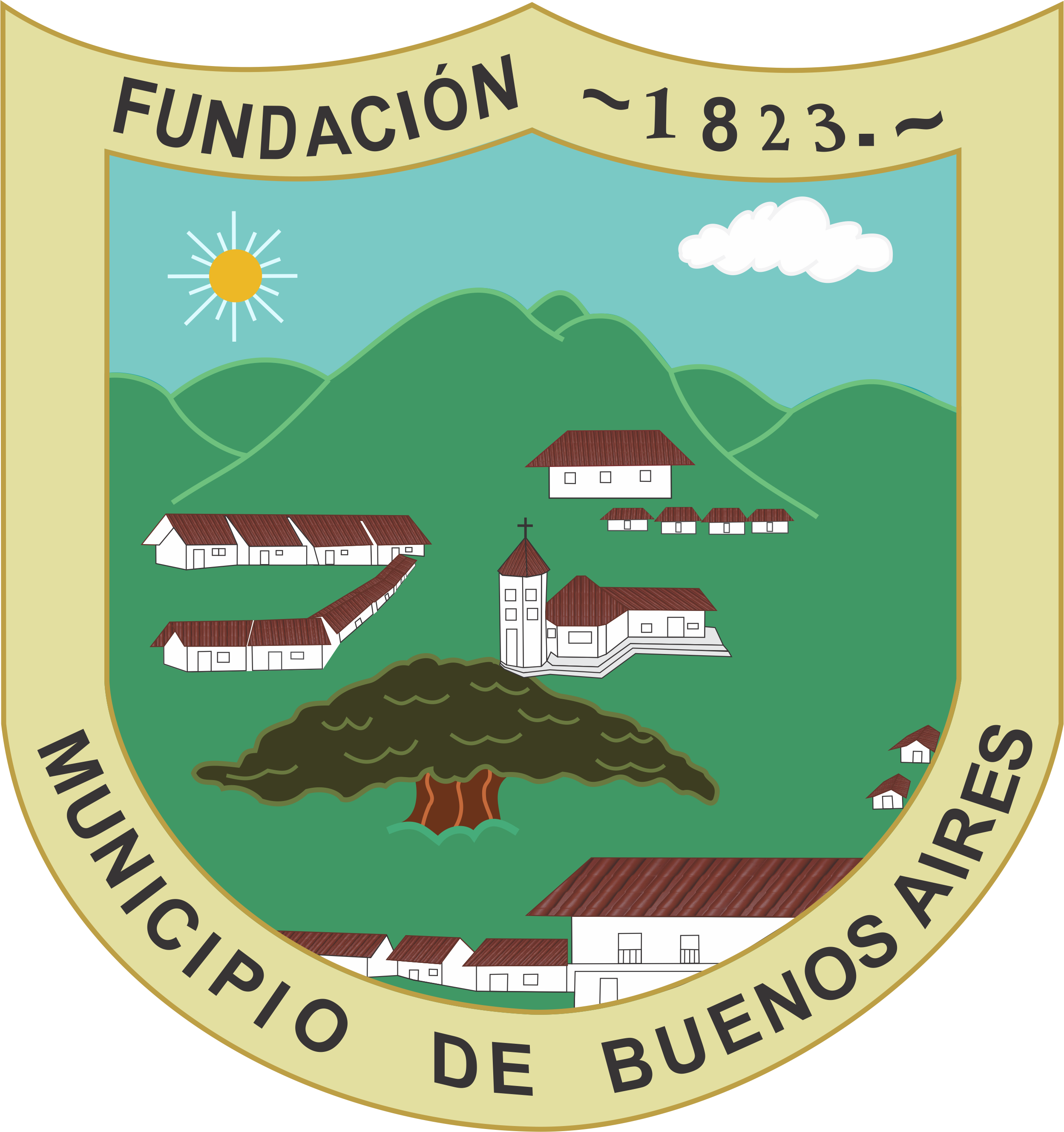
- Flag Coat of arms

- Location of the municipality and town of Buenos Aires, Cauca in the Cauca Department of Colombia.
- Country: Colombia
- Department: Cauca Department

Area
  - Total: 410 km^{2} (160 sq mi)
- Elevation: 2,313 m (7,589 ft)

Population (2020 est.)
  - Total: 35,197
- Time zone: UTC-5 (Colombia Standard Time)
- Climate: Af

Buenos Aires is a town and municipality in the Cauca Department, Colombia. Founded in by Vasco de Guzmán and Alonso de Fuenmayor in 1551, the municipality covers an area 520 km^{2} (201 sq mi) and has a population of 21,300. The population is primarily engaged in agriculture and ranching.
