= Chameleon Operation (Colombia) =

2010 military operation by the Colombian national army

Date	June 13th and 14th, 2010.
Location	Rural area of Guaviare (Colombia), near the Inírida River 2°9′50″N 72°35′42″W

Belligerents
National Army of Colombia	Revolutionary Armed Forces of Colombia

Strength
300 military personnel	40 "guerrilleros"
- 1970s Anorí 1980s Palace of Justice siege 1990s Casa Verde | Girasoles | Las Delicias | Quebrada El Billar | Miraflores | Siege of Mitú 2000s Berlín | Resumption of the demilitarized zone | Alcatraz | Operation Jaque | Operacion Fenix | Dinastía Year 2010 Camaleón | Sodoma | Némésis | Odiseo | 2013 Colombian clashes (peace process)
- Location within Colombia

Chameleon Operation (in Spanish, Operación Camaleón) is a military operation by the National Army of Colombia that took place on June 13 and 14, 2010, with the aim of freeing four hostages held by the Revolutionary Armed Forces of Colombia (FARC) guerrilla group. The hostages included three members of the Colombian National Police (General Luis Herlindo Mendieta and Colonels Enrique Murillo and William Donato Gómez) and Sergeant Arbey Delgado from the national army. The operation took place in the municipality of El Retorno, in a jungle area where the Inírida river rises in the department of Guaviare, 28 kilometers from the site of Operation Jaque, which led to the release of 15 hostages in 2008.

This mission was made possible thanks to several months of analysis by military intelligence and information gathered by army and police agents who infiltrated the FARC, as well as during the capture of guerrilla Marcos Parrilla. Parrilla provided the coordinates of the area where the hostages were being held. At 5:30 p.m. on June 10, President Álvaro Uribe gave the go-ahead to the commander of the military forces, General Freddy Padilla de León, for the deployment of troops and the launch of Operation Chameleon. The offensive began on June 13 and led to the release of four hostages held for almost twelve years. The guerrillas' point of view on these events is unknown.

Following the success of the operation, the army commander, Oscar González, declared that the informers who had made the rescue possible had received a reward of 2.5 billion pesos. For the Colombian political opposition, Operation Chameleon was set up to influence the run-off presidential election, a claim denied by Álvaro Uribe.

== Context ==
The Chameleon Operation was one of many operations carried out against FARC during the Colombian civil war. This civil war had its origins following the assassination of the liberal leader Jorge Eliécer Gaitán on April 9, 1948, which was followed by a day of demonstrations, riots, and violent repression known as the "Bogotazo". The Bogotazo was the first episode of La Violencia, a period of great violence between conservatives and liberals that facilitated the emergence of two Marxist guerrilla groups: the Revolutionary Armed Forces of Colombia (FARC) and the National Liberation Army (ELN).

Álvaro Uribe Vélez, first elected on May 26, 2002, and re-elected on May 28, 2006, took over the reins of the Colombian presidency after eight years of intense FARC activity, which included several major victories: the attacks on Las Delicias in 1996, El Billar, Miraflores and Mitú in 1998. During the 2002 presidential campaign, Uribe declared, "We have the right to live in a country at peace, and the obligation to help achieve it", and promised that he would be "Colombia's first soldier". Once in power, he pursued an aggressive policy towards the guerrillas, dubbed "democratic security", with the aim of forcing them to negotiate by inflicting military losses. To achieve this, he reinforced the army's human and material resources. Accepting to negotiate only with guerrillas who agreed to declare a ceasefire, Uribe achieved a number of successes: the demobilization of tens of thousands of paramilitary group members, the ceasefire of the AUC, the release of hostages as in the case of Operation Jaque, and the death of FARC leaders such as Raúl Reyes during Operation Phoenix.

In 2010, Álvaro Uribe was constitutionally prohibited from seeking a third term in office, so he endorsed the presidential candidacy of his former defense minister, Juan Manuel Santos, who was instrumental in the armed forces' successes during operations Phoenix and Jaque in 2008. At the end of the first round of voting on May 30 of the same year, Uribe's successor, the Partido Social de Unidad Nacional candidate, came out well ahead with 46.56% of the vote, against 21.49% for the Partido Verde candidate, Antanas Mockus, who was thus the favorite for the second round of the presidential election scheduled for June 20, 2010. Hence, the operation took place between the two presidential rounds.

== Planification ==
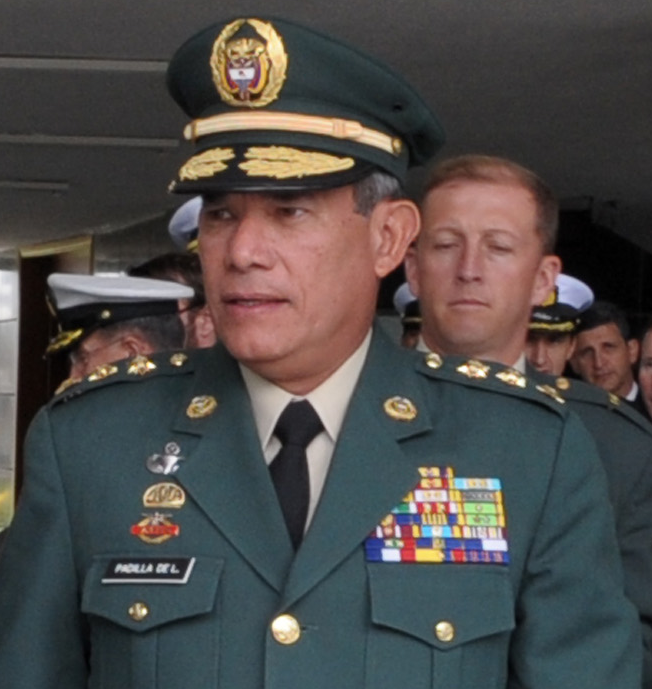
General Freddy Padilla de León, commander of the military forces during Chameleon Operation.

According to the Colombian authorities' press statement, several months before the launch of "Chameleon Operation", army and police agents infiltrated FARC, cautiously retrieving data from the field on a weekly basis. They penetrated their security systems, copying the new internal communications keys and frequencies that FARC had modified following Operation Jaque. This information was processed by the commander of the Fuerza de Tarea Conjunta Omega (FUTCO), General Javier Flórez, who then passed it on to the higher military hierarchy.

After several months of analyzing the information in their possession, three of the most experienced military intelligence colonels decided to visit General Óscar Enrique González Peña in the first week of February 2010. One of them, who had previously taken part in Operation Jaque in 2008, pinpointed the area where the hostages were located in the department of Guaviare. Thus, the planning was based on all the information processed since 2007, with Jhon Frank Pinchao having succeeded in escaping (after having been a FARC hostage for almost nine years), the unilateral releases of the Marxist guerrillas, and the rescue of the 15 people kidnapped during Operation Jaque. In addition, guerrilla communications were constantly deciphered, enabling triangulation of the zone between the corregimiento La Paz, the municipality of Calamar, and the Inírida river in the Guaviare.

The intelligence men called the operation "Operación Maestría", while the special operations men preferred to call it "Operación Camaleón". In early March 2010, it began to take shape, thanks to reports from military intelligence and 300 men from the Special Forces (Fuerzas Especiales). On March 12, Marcos Parrilla, a guerrilla from the FARC's Frente Primero, was captured by the Fuerza de Tarea Conjunta Omega, an elite unit made up of men from the army, navy, air force, and police whose mission is to kill the FARC's main leaders. He later resigned, giving important information to enable the operation to be carried out, such as the coordinates of the area where the hostages were located. He also informed that the guerrilla group and its hostages moved frequently, staying in one place for a short period of time ranging from 8 to 15 days, data which was verified by army intelligence services. FARC infiltrators even managed to reach the camp where the prisoners were being held and set up surveillance systems in various parts of the Guaviare jungle.

The army learned that the hostages were being held by guerrillas from the FARC's Séptimo Frente unit. According to the commander of the military forces, General Freddy Padilla de León, the operation, initially planned for a fortnight, actually lasted only eight days, 36 of which were critical and very high-risk hours.

== Course of events ==
Location of El Retorno in the Guaviare department.

The final stage of Chameleon Operation began on June 2, 2010, with the aim of delivering the final blow to the enemy by June 17, in the knowledge that the hostages could be moved to another camp. That day, some fifty army commandos abseiled into the jungle of the Guaviare department. On the ground, the soldiers were under the command of a captain and two lieutenants from the special forces. At the same time, two colonels who had taken part in Operation Phoenix directed the action from San José del Guaviare. The soldiers were dropped off some thirty kilometers from the FARC camp where the hostages were being held, in the Salto Gloria vereda attached to the municipality of El Retorno. They began to advance cautiously and slowly, averaging 3 km a day towards their objective, only reaching it after ten days, crawling the last two kilometers overnight. Once there, their mission was to observe all the movements of the guerillas guarding the hostages.

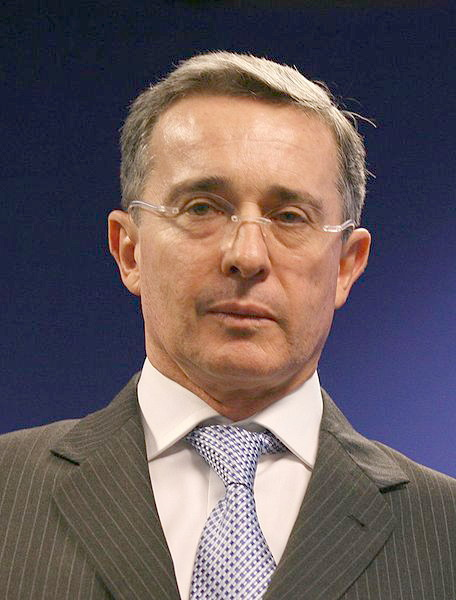
President Álvaro Uribe authorized the launch of Chameleon Operation on June 10th, 2010 at 5:30 pm.

On June 10, at 5:30 p.m., President Álvaro Uribe gave the commander of the military forces, General Freddy Padilla de León, the go-ahead to deploy the troops and launch Operation Chameleon. The following day, some 300 special forces men were selected by the general and sent to the Joaquín París Battalion in San José del Guaviare. On Saturday, June 12, at 1 p.m., or "operation zero hour", air force aircraft were attached to the battalion.

At 10 a.m. on June 13, men from the Comando de Operaciones Especiales (COPES) descended from Black Hawk helicopters into an area four kilometers from the guerrilla camp. At 11:30 a.m., army commandos arrived at the guerrilla camp, and launched their offensive against the guerrillas as they were about to have lunch. In order to neutralize the guerrillas, the planned tactic was to carry out a 25-minute firefight without a break. Although Marcos Padilla had told the army that the enemy camp consisted of between 100 and 200 guerrillas, the commando was confronted by a group of around 40. This surprise attack caused the kidnappers to flee for cover, while the prisoners took advantage of the situation to escape in different directions. At 12.40 p.m., General Luis Herlindo Mendieta and Colonel Enrique Murillo were the first hostages to be freed at the Puerto Nápolis vereda (on the border between the departments of Guaviare and Guainía). Escorted by a motorcade of 30 commandos, they were immediately withdrawn from the combat zone, while other soldiers were still searching for Sergeant Delgado and Colonel Donato. At 5:30 p.m., the soldiers recovered Sergeant Arbey Delgado, who had become separated from Colonel Donato during their escape, to increase their chances of survival. However, Chameleon Operation was extended into the early hours of Monday June 14, as the army was unable to immediately recover Colonel William Donato Gómez, who had become lost in the jungle. Taking refuge in a hideout where he had spent the night, he was found at 7:15 a.m., one kilometer from the site of the attack.

The soldiers and hostages were evacuated from the area by helicopter. A plane then took them to the CATAM (Comando Aéreo de Transporte Militar) air base in Bogotá, where they were received by former hostages Gloria Polanco, Consuelo González, and Orlando Beltrán. After six months of planning, 36 hours in the dense forest, and 25 minutes of heavy gunfire, the operation ended without casualties. Mendieta, Murillo, Delgado, and Donato attended the reception organized by the military high command to celebrate their liberation. After a brief welcome, they were sent to the Central Military Hospital for medical evaluation. According to Defense Minister Gabriel Silva Luján, Chameleon Operation required "surgical precision" and was carried out "without any outside help". On the other hand, he was opposed to divulging any further details of the operation, as "to give details would be tantamount to informing the enemy", given that FARC were still holding 19 policemen and military personnel, as well as around 70 civilians.

== Hostages ==
The four men had spent almost twelve years in FARC captivity. Arbey Delgado and William Donato Gómez had been taken prisoner by the guerrillas during the capture of Miraflores in the town of the same name on the night of Monday August 3, 1998. During this attack, the police anti-drug base in the municipality was besieged by a group of at least 500 FARC guerrillas, resulting in the deaths of 16 members of the public forces and three civilians, as well as the kidnapping of 75 military personnel and 54 police officers.

As for Luis Mendieta and Enrique Murillo, they had been held captive by FARC since the seizure of Mitú on November 1, 1998, which resulted in the death of 37 members of the public forces and the kidnapping of 61 others. The army recaptured the town in less than 48 hours thanks to support from Brazil, which allowed the Colombian army to use an air base near Mitú to bring in reinforcements, as the guerrillas had burnt down the airstrip before their attack and the area was not accessible by land. General Mendieta, who had begun his career in the Colombian National Police on August 12, 1974, was considered the highest-ranking FARC detainee. During his captivity, he obtained the rank of Brigadier-General of the Republic of Colombia on January 8, 2009, when he was a lieutenant-colonel, thus becoming the highest-ranking officer held by the Marxist guerrillas.

The hostages identified Juan Duque Nieto, nicknamed Chucho Díaz, as the leader of their captors. According to Colombian intelligence services, this guerrilla was No. 2 in the FARC's eastern bloc Séptimo Frente, led by Jorge Briceño Suárez, alias Mono Jojoy.

== Aftermath and reactions ==
=== Colombia ===
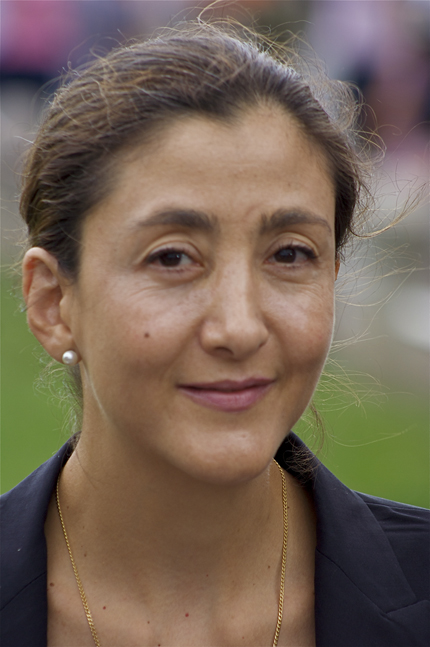
Íngrid Betancourt, one of the fifteen hostages freed during Operation Jaque.

Following the success of the operation, the army commander, General Oscar González, declared that the Colombian government had rewarded Marcos Parrilla and three other informers with 2.5 billion pesos for helping to free the four hostages. Once the assault had been completed and Luis Mendieta and Enrique Murillo freed, while the army was still searching for William Donato and Arbey Delgado, President Álvaro Uribe publicly announced the success of the operation while presiding over Community Council No. 296 on his eight years in power (2002-2010) in the town of Quibdó. On this occasion, the television broadcast of a World Cup soccer match in South Africa was interrupted to make way for the Colombian president's speech.

Chameleon Operation was the first successful rescue since Operation Jaque on July 2, 2008, which freed 15 hostages, including the French-Colombian Íngrid Betancourt. It came a week before the second round of the presidential election scheduled for June 20. According to political scientist Alejo Vargas, the army's action may have strengthened the lead held by Partido Social de Unidad Nacional candidate Juan Manuel Santos, who was already well ahead in the first round, with 46.56% of the vote to 21.49% for Partido Verde candidate Antanas Mockus. Another political scientist, Ruben Sanchez, a professor at Bogotá's Del Rosario Private University, even declared that "this operation had been planned for a long time and (that) it was reserved for these days". The army's success was a reminder that the guerrillas had suffered a number of stinging media setbacks while Santos was Minister of Defense, such as the death of Raúl Reyes during Operation Phoenix on March 1, 2008, and the release of Íngrid Betancourt. The political opposition to Álvaro Uribe's government claimed that Chameleon Operation had been set up to influence the second round of the presidential election, which Uribe denied.

According to telephone conversations intercepted by the Colombian army, FARC high command gave the order to kill all guerrillas guarding hostages during Chameleon Operation. General Oscar González took the opportunity to point out that the Colombian government offered reintegration plans to guerrillas who were demobilized.

=== United States ===
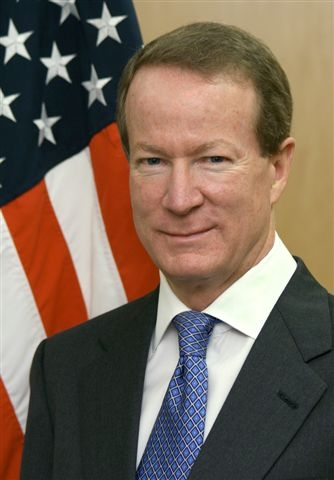
According to William Brownfield, Colombia and the United States collaborated in this operation.

Following the Colombian army's success, U.S. Ambassador William Brownfield described Chameleon Operation as "magnificent and sensational", adding that his government had participated in the military intelligence work.

Thus, the diplomat declared that Chameleon was "a Colombian concept, plan and operation", adding that it was no surprise or secret that the Colombian and US governments had been collaborating in the intelligence field for over 10 years, and that the two countries shared information, equipment and intelligence-gathering systems. However, these words contradict those of Defense Minister Gabriel Silva, who claimed that Operation Chameleon was carried out "without any outside help".

== Inconsistencies ==
Although the operation was a success for the Colombian army, there were a number of inconsistencies. While the Colombian Minister of Defense, Gabriel Silva, claimed that the operation had been carried out "without any outside help", the U.S. Ambassador to Colombia, William Brownfield, declared that the U.S. government had been involved in military intelligence work during the operation.

On the other hand, Colonel William Donato, who had spent 15 hours hiding in the jungle, recounted that, during the night following the assault on the FARC camp, he heard helicopters flying overhead, and that when he ran to signal his presence, military aircraft began bombing a nearby area, forcing him to take refuge once again. The head of the Colombian army, General Óscar González, denied this, arguing that the army couldn't even think of bombing while trying to protect the hostages' lives.

A few days after the hostages were freed, General Freddy Padilla de León asserted that not a single soldier of the armed forces had been killed during the operation, and that, to his knowledge, the same was true of the FARC. Thus, according to him, Corporal Edward Milciades Guzmán Barón, who died of his wounds on June 17 after being shot by a FARC sniper in San José del Guaviare, did not take part in Operation Chameleon. However, according to the deceased's family, he had been sent to the front with other soldiers to guard the area and surround the guerrillas in the camp, so that the special commando could free the hostages.
