= San Antonio, Mitú =

San Antonio
- Location in Vaupés Department and Colombia San Antonio (Colombia)
- Coordinates: 1°12′42.7″N 70°42′34.8″W
- Country: Colombia
- Department: Vaupés Department
- Municipality: Mitú Municipality
- Elevation: 607 ft (185 m)
- Time zone: UTC-5 (Colombia Standard Time)

San Antonio is a vereda in Mitú Municipality, Vaupés Department Department in Colombia.

== Climate ==
San Antonio has a very wet tropical rainforest climate (Af) with heavy to very heavy rainfall year-round.

Climate data for San Antonio
Month	Jan	Feb	Mar	Apr	May	Jun	Jul	Aug	Sep	Oct	Nov	Dec	Year
Mean daily maximum °C (°F)	30.4 (86.7)	31.0 (87.8)	31.0 (87.8)	30.1 (86.2)	28.2 (82.8)	28.5 (83.3)	28.1 (82.6)	28.7 (83.7)	29.6 (85.3)	29.3 (84.7)	30.0 (86.0)	29.7 (85.5)	29.6 (85.2)
Daily mean °C (°F)	26.3 (79.3)	26.6 (79.9)	26.8 (80.2)	26.3 (79.3)	25.5 (77.9)	25.4 (77.7)	25.0 (77.0)	25.2 (77.4)	25.9 (78.6)	26.0 (78.8)	26.3 (79.3)	25.8 (78.4)	25.9 (78.6)
Mean daily minimum °C (°F)	22.2 (72.0)	22.3 (72.1)	22.7 (72.9)	22.5 (72.5)	22.9 (73.2)	22.4 (72.3)	21.9 (71.4)	21.8 (71.2)	22.2 (72.0)	22.7 (72.9)	22.7 (72.9)	22.0 (71.6)	22.4 (72.3)
Average rainfall mm (inches)	183.9 (7.24)	246.1 (9.69)	358.0 (14.09)	467.0 (18.39)	516.2 (20.32)	470.5 (18.52)	500.1 (19.69)	419.0 (16.50)	395.0 (15.55)	350.8 (13.81)	342.0 (13.46)	290.3 (11.43)	4,538.9 (178.69)
Average rainy days	11	13	16	20	23	22	21	20	17	16	16	14	209
Source: IDEAM
