= Cubeo =

Cubeo may refer to:

- Cubeo people, an ethnic group of Colombia
- Cubeo language, a language of Colombia
