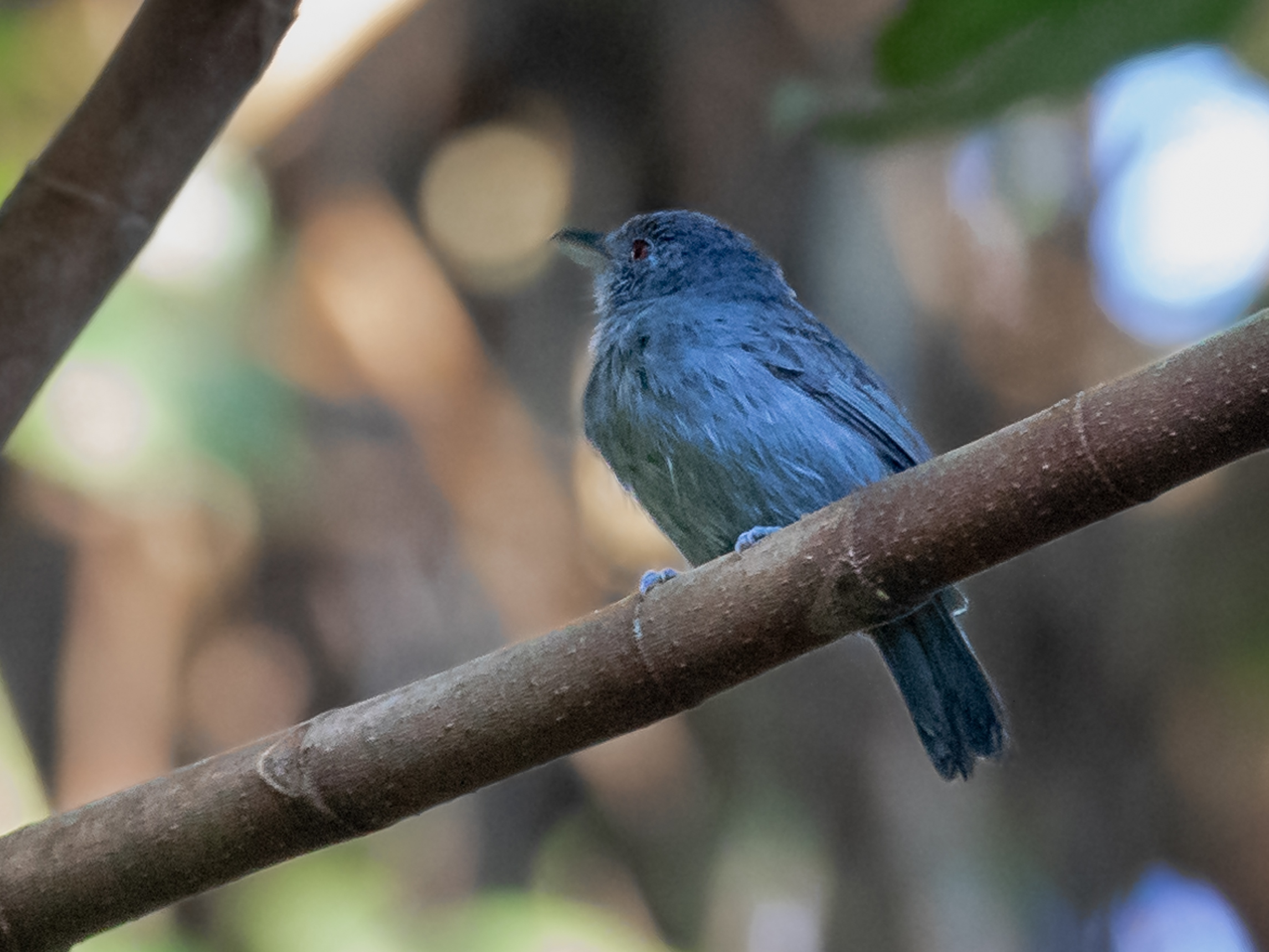

Conservation status
- Least Concern (IUCN 3.1)

Scientific classification
- Kingdom: Animalia
- Phylum: Chordata
- Class: Aves
- Order: Passeriformes
- Family: Thamnophilidae
- Genus: Thamnophilus
- Species: T. schistaceus

Binomial name
- Thamnophilus schistaceus D'Orbigny, 1837

= Plain-winged antshrike =

Species of bird

The plain-winged antshrike (Thamnophilus schistaceus), sometimes called the black-capped antshrike, is a species of bird in subfamily Thamnophilinae of family Thamnophilidae, the "typical antbirds". It is found in Bolivia, Brazil, Colombia, Ecuador, and Peru.

== Taxonomy and systematics ==
The plain-winged antshrike has three subspecies, the nominate T. s. schistaceus (D'Orbigny, 1837), T. s. capitalis (Sclater, PL, 1858), and T. s. heterogynus (Hellmayr, 1907). Some authors have suggested that T. s. heterogynus might deserve full species status. The plain-winged antshrike and the mouse-colored antshrike (T. murinus) are sister species.

== Description ==
The plain-winged antshrike is 13 to 14 cm (5.1 to 5.5 in) long and weighs 19 to 21 g (0.67 to 0.74 oz). Members of genus Thamnophilus are largish members of the antbird family; all have stout bills with a hook like those of true shrikes. This species exhibits significant sexual dimorphism. Adult males of the nominate subspecies are almost entirely gray, with slightly darker upperparts than underparts. Their wings and wing coverts have a slight brownish tinge. Adult females have a rufous crown and a grayish face. Their upperparts are yellowish olive-brown and their underparts pale olive-brown. In both sexes individuals are darker in the western part of their range than the east. Subadults of both sexes are similar to adult females but with variable underparts' color. Both sexes have a red iris. Males of subspecies T. s. capitalis have a black crown. Females of subspecies T. s. heterogynus have rufous-brown upperparts and rich ochraceous underparts.

== Distribution and habitat ==
The nominate subspecies of the plain-winged antshrike is found in Peru from south of the Marañón and Amazon rivers into Bolivia as far as central Santa Cruz Department and in southern Amazonian Brazil. In Brazil its range is roughly bounded by the lower Juruá River in Amazonas State, the Tocantins River in Pará and Tocantins, Acre, Rondônia, northern and western Mato Grosso, and southern Pará. Subspecies T. s. capitalis is found from Vaupés Department in extreme eastern Colombia east and south into west-central Amazonian Brazil to the Solimões River (upper Amazon) as far east as the Madeira River. Subspecies T. s. heterogynus is found from southeastern Colombia's Meta Department south through eastern Ecuador into northeastern Peru north of the Marañón and Amazon.

The plain-winged antshrike inhabits humid evergreen forest, both seasonally flooded forest in the lowlands and drier terra firme upland forest. It favors the understorey to midstorey of the forest interior and also occurs in dense vegetation at the forest edges and in nearby secondary forest. In elevation it is found mostly below 1,000 m (3,300 ft) in Ecuador, below 800 m (2,600 ft) in Colombia, up to 1,300 m (4,300 ft) in Peru, and from sea level to 900 m (3,000 ft) in Brazil.

== Behavior ==
=== Movement ===
The plain-winged antshrike is presumed to be a year-round resident throughout its range.

=== Feeding ===
The plain-winged antshrike's diet is not known in detail but is mostly insects and other arthropods. It usually forages singly or in pairs and regularly joins mixed-species feeding flocks as they move through its territory. It usually forages between about 5 and 10 m (15 and 35 ft) above the ground but will feed as high as 30 m (100 ft). It forages while hopping among branches, commonly sallying to glean prey from leaves, stems, vines, and branches. It also gleans by reaching from a perch and while briefly hovering. There is one record of an individual following an army ant swarm to catch prey fleeing the ants.

=== Breeding ===
The plain-winged antshrike's breeding season has not been defined. Four active nests have been described; they were found in February and October in Brazil and in March and September in Peru. They were shallow cups made of coarse plant fibers and other plant material and covered with moss, lichen, or fungus-covered twigs. They were hidden among foliage suspended by their rim in a branch fork within 2 m (7 ft) of the ground. Their clutches of two eggs were incubated by both parents during the day. The incubation period, time to fledging, and other details of parental care are not known.

=== Vocalization ===
The plain-winged antshrikes's song differs somewhat among the subspecies. In general it is "a slightly accelerating series of similar notes at same pitch, ending in sharply downslurred note that 'falls off' to a lower pitch". Both the number of notes and pace vary; the song of subspecies T. s. heterogynus has more abrupt notes, a faster pace, and a lower pitch on the first note than those of the other two subspecies. The species' calls include a "long, slightly downslurred, somewhat plaintive note" that often repeated for a long period, a "soft nasal note", a "quiet whistled note", and in alarm "short growls given rapidly".

== Status ==
The IUCN has assessed the plain-winged antshrike as being of Least Concern. It has a large range; its population size is not known and is believed to be decreasing. No immediate threats have been identified. It is considered fairly common to common across its range, which includes "vast areas of intact, protected habitat".
