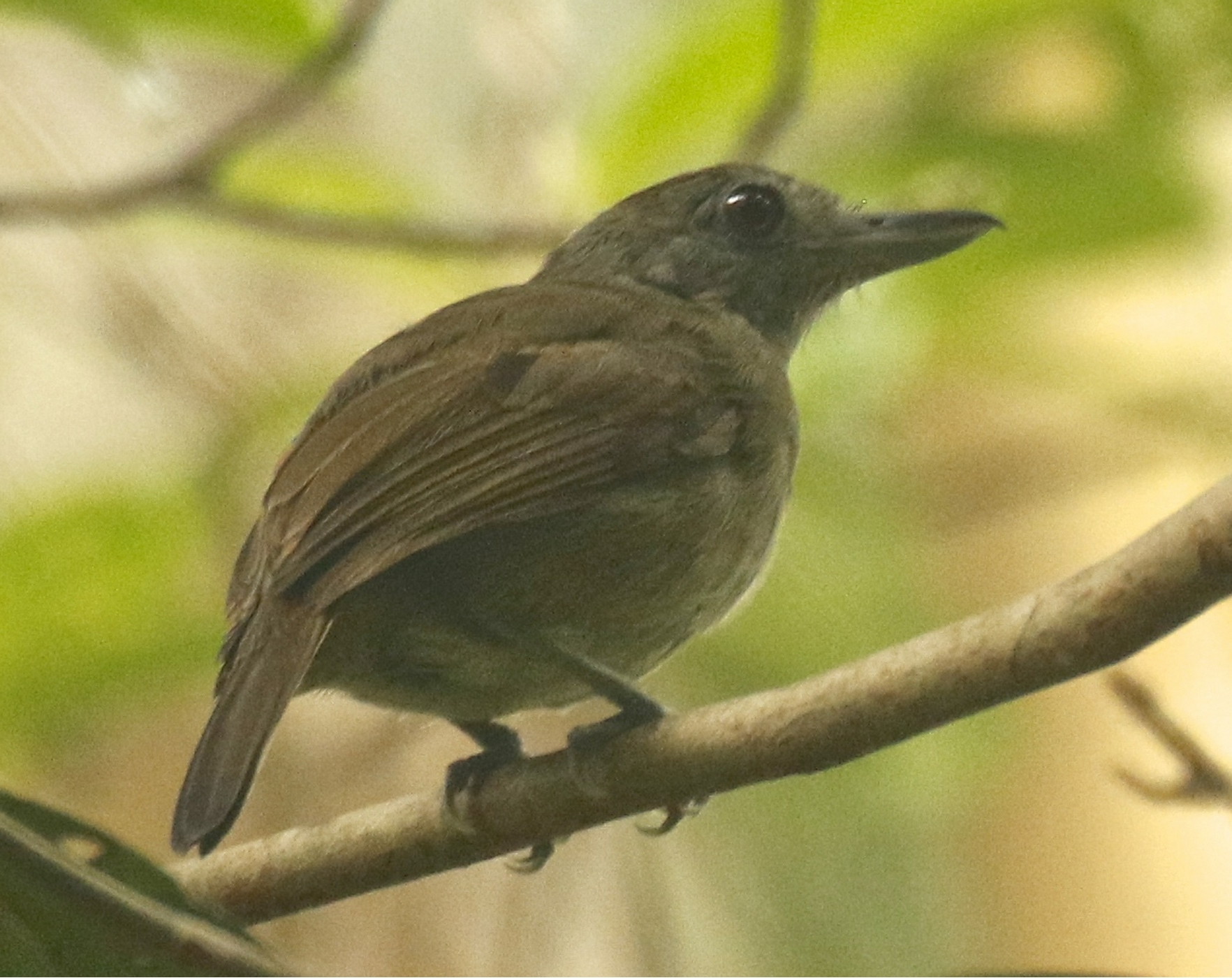
- Sacha Lodge - Ecuador

Conservation status
- Least Concern (IUCN 3.1)

Scientific classification
- Kingdom: Animalia
- Phylum: Chordata
- Class: Aves
- Order: Passeriformes
- Family: Thamnophilidae
- Genus: Thamnophilus
- Species: T. murinus

Binomial name
- Thamnophilus murinus Sclater, PL & Salvin, 1868

= Mouse-colored antshrike =

Species of bird

The mouse-colored antshrike (Thamnophilus murinus) is a species of bird in subfamily Thamnophilinae of family Thamnophilidae, the "typical antbirds". It is found in Bolivia, Brazil, Colombia, Ecuador, French Guiana, Guyana, Peru, Suriname, and Venezuela.

== Taxonomy and systematics ==
The mouse-colored antshrike was described by the English ornithologists Philip Sclater and Osbert Salvin in 1868 and given its current binomial name Thamnophilus murinus. It and the plain-winged antshrike (T. schistaceus) are sister species.

The mouse-colored antshrike has three subspecies, the nominate T. m. murinus (Sclater, PL & Salvin, 1868), T. canipennis (Todd, 1927), and T. cayennensis (Todd, 1927).

== Description ==
The mouse-colored antshrike is 13 to 14 cm (5.1 to 5.5 in) long and weighs 17 to 20 g (0.60 to 0.71 oz). Members of genus Thamnophilus are largish members of the antbird family; all have stout bills with a hook like those of true shrikes. This species exhibits significant sexual dimorphism. Adult males of the nominate subspecies have gray upperparts with a hidden white patch between their scapulars. Their wings are dark yellowish brown that is somewhat rufous in the eastern part of its range; their wing coverts are grayer with buffy white tips. Their tail is brownish black and gray with white feather tips. Their underparts are a paler gray than their upperparts, especially on their throat and belly, and the center of their belly often is white. Adult females have a dull rufous forehead and crown. Their upperparts are olive-brown. Their wings are brown, and like the males' more rufous in the east; their wing coverts and flight feathers have buffy white tips and edges. Their tail is warm brown with thin white tips on the outer feathers. Their underparts are pale gray with an olive tinge on the flanks and a yellowish brown tinge on the breast, sides, and crissum. Both sexes have a gray or brown iris. Males of subspecies T. cayennensis have somewhat more reddish brown wings than the nominate. Males of T. canipennis have gray wings and wing coverts with grayish white tips and edges; both sexes have a gray iris.

== Distribution and habitat ==
The nominate subspecies of the mouse-colored antshrike is found from east-central Colombia's Guainía and Vaupés departments east through southern Venezuela, Guyana, and Suriname and through Brazil north of the Amazon from the Negro River as far as northeastern Amazonas state. Subspecies T. cayennensis is found in French Guiana and in northeastern Brazil north of the Amazon in Amapá and Pará states. T. canipennis is found from southeastern Colombia's Amazonas Department south through most of eastern Ecuador into eastern Peru as far south as northwestern Madre de Dios Department and into extreme northern Bolivia. Its range also extends east into western Brazil to the Japurá River and beyond south of the Amazon to the Madeira River.

The mouse-colored antshrike primarily inhabits lowland terra firme and white-sand evergreen forest. It favors the forest understorey to mid-storey, usually in the forest interior but also at its edges. In elevation it is found below 400 m (1,300 ft) in Colombia, below 450 m (1,500 ft) in Ecuador, below 1,200 m (3,900 ft) in Peru, and below 1,300 m (4,300 ft) in Venezuela and Brazil.

== Behavior ==
=== Movement ===
The mouse-colored antshrike is presumed to be a year-round resident throughout its range.

=== Feeding ===
The mouse-colored antshrike's diet is not known in detail but is mostly insects and other arthropods. It usually forages singly or in pairs and infrequently joins mixed-species feeding flocks. In tall forest it usually forages between 5 and 10 m (15 and 35 ft) above the ground but will feed as high as 25 m (80 ft) and as low as 2 m (5 ft). In areas with a lower canopy it typically feeds between 3 and 8 m (10 and 25 ft) above the ground. It forages while hopping among branches, gleaning prey from leaves, stems, vines, and branches while perched, with short sallies, and while briefly hovering. There a few records of an individual following an army ant swarm to catch prey fleeing the ants.

=== Breeding ===
The mouse-colored antshrike's breeding season has not been defined. There are records of breeding activity in French Guiana in January, May, and September; its season in Brazil apparently spans from August to November. Its nest is a cup made mostly from fungal rhizomorphs with dried leaves and twigs on the outside. It is typically suspended by its rim in a branch fork about 2 to 3 m (7 to 10 ft) above the ground. The clutch size is two eggs and both parents incubate during the day. The incubation period, time to fledging, and other details of parental care are not known.

=== Vocalization ===
The mouse-colored antshrike's song is "slightly accelerating series of up to c. 15 similar notes". It has been written as "arr arr arr-arr wee'AWR". Its main call is "nasal and abrupt"; others are "a flat, raspy whine", "a clear note that becomes a raspy growl", "variable whines", and "abrupt notes".

== Status ==
The IUCN has assessed the mouse-colored antshrike as being of Least Concern. It has a large range; its population size is not known and is believed to be decreasing. No immediate threats have been identified. It is considered fairly common to common in most of its range but uncommon in Ecuador and uncommon to locally fairly common in Venezuela and Peru. "Vast areas of protected suitable habitat exist within its range [but it is] somewhat sensitive to selective logging."
