= Cubeo people =

Indigenous people in Colombia

The Cubeo are an ethnic group of the Vaupés Department (Colombia). Cubeo is a generic name that is used in local Spanish and appears in the literature in reference to a social and linguistic group. Although the term does not have any meaning in their language, the Cubeo refer to themselves by that name in interactions with others. There is no common native name, aside from referring to themselves as "people" (pâmiwâ) or, more precisely, "my people" (jiwa). An individual's social identification is based on their adscription to a mythical clan forebear whose name is used as an eponym.

== Location ==
The Cubeo live in the area of the Vaupés Department in Colombia, near the center of the Northwestern Cultural Area of the Amazon. Their villages are distributed along the median course of the capital Mitú (Cubeo: Ãrucuibo) and, above all, alongside its affluents the Cuduyari (Curujaríya) and Querary (Cʉrajaríya) rivers.

== Population ==
Reports of the population vary between 3,000 and 5,000 individuals. The national census of 1985 established the number of inhabitants at 4,368.

== Language ==
The language of the Cubeo has been classified as belonging to Eastern Tukano. Recently, however, a reclassification has been suggested to Middle Tukano, a subdivision of a possible Proto-Tukano. This language is one of the rare OVS languages in the world.

== See also ==
- Indigenous peoples in Colombia
- Tucanoan languages
