= Tito Hoz de Vila =

Minister of Education
- In office 1997–2001
- President: Hugo Banzer

Personal details
- Born: 12 April 1949 Cochabamba, Bolivia
- Died: 3 August 2015 (aged 66) Villa Fátima, Colombia
- Party: Nationalist Democratic Action
- Education: University of San Simón

Tito Hoz de Vila (12 April 1949 – 3 August 2015) was a Bolivian lawyer, businessman and politician. He was Minister of Education of Bolivia from 1997 to 2001, during the second government of President Hugo Banzer. He died on 3 August 2015 after the vehicle he was traveling in crashed on the way from Yungas to La Paz.

== Early life and education ==
Tito Hoz de Vila was born 12 April 1949 in Cochabamba, Bolivia. He completed education in Cochabamba, studying business administration at the University of San Simón.

== Career ==
During his working life, Hoz de Vila belonged to the Junior Chamber of Entrepreneurs, becoming executive vice president. He was primarily focused on business activities related to commercial companies but went on to become involved with Bolivian media initiatives. From 1982 to 1984 he served as executive secretary of the Confederation of Private Businessmen of Bolivia (CEPB) and from 1984 to 1989 he was director of the National Chamber of Industry. In 2002, Hoz de Vila was a vice presidential candidate, running with Ronald MacLean Abaroa on the Nationalist Democratic Action ticket.

== Death ==
On 3 August 2015 Hoz de Vila was traveling alone from Yungas to La Paz along the Yungas Road, when his car crashed and fell over 100 meters. He was rescued by the and taken to a nearby hospital in Villa Fátima, where he died of his injuries.
