= Tinigua language =

Endangered language of Colombia

Tinigua
- Tiniguas
- Tinigʷa
- Pronunciation: [tinigʷa]
- Native to: Colombia
- Region: Meta Department, Colombia; Serranía de la Macarena, Colombia
- Ethnicity: (undated figure of 1)
- Native speakers: 1 (2019)
- Language family: Tiniguan: Tinigua

Language codes
- ISO 639-3: tit
- Glottolog: tini1245
- ELP: Tinigua
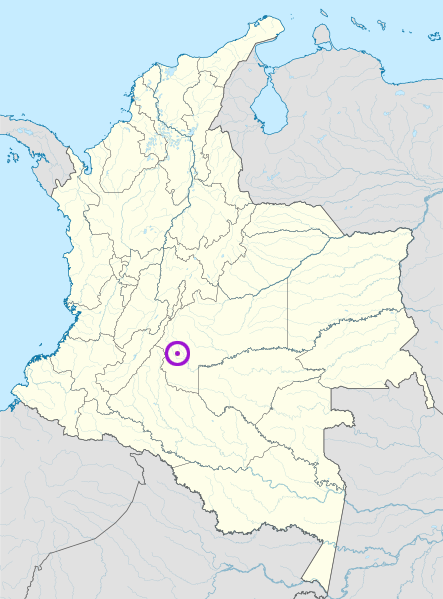

Tinigua (Tiniguas) is an endangered Tiniguan language spoken in Colombia that used to form a small language family with the now-extinct Pamigua language. It is spoken by only one person.

== Name ==
The name "Tinigua" comes from the words tiní 'old' and gwá 'as, like' and thus means 'language of the old'.

== Speakers ==
As of 2000, Tinigua had only two remaining speakers, Sixto Muñoz (Tinigua name: Sɨsɨthio ‘knife’) and his brother, Criterio. Criterio died around 2005, leaving behind Sixto as the last remaining speaker of Tinigua. Formerly a resident of the Serranía de la Macarena in Meta Department, Sixto Muñoz currently resides in Jiw village of Barrancón, near the main town of Guaviare Department. There may have been more speakers located elsewhere, as a farmer reportedly met others who spoke the same language as Sixto. They lived in Meta Department, between the Upper Guayabero and Yari rivers.

Muñoz also speaks Spanish and is thought to have been born somewhere from 1924 to 1929. He has five children, but he chose not to teach them Tinigua because they would not have any use for it.

== Phonology ==
The following phonological description of Tinigua is tentative due to the scarce documentation of the language. There are likely inaccuracies and missing phonological contrasts.

=== Vowels ===
Tinigua vowels
	Front	Central	Back
Close	i	ɨ	u
Mid	e		o
Open		a	

=== Consonants ===
Tinigua consonants
		Bilabial	Alveolar	Palatal	Velar		Glottal
		Bilabial	Alveolar	Palatal	voiceless	voiced	Glottal
Stop	plain	p	t		k	g	ʔ
Stop	aspirated		tʰ		kʰ		
Stop	labialized				kʷ	gʷ	
Affricate			t͡s	t͡ʃ			
Fricative		ɸ	s				h
Nasal		m	n	ɲ			
Approximant		w		j			

/g/ is not attested word-initially and has a limited distribution. /t͡ʃ/ and /t͡s/ sometimes alternate with each other, but also contrast with each other.

=== Phonotactics ===
Tinigua syllable structure is typically CV or CVC, where C represents any consonant and V any vowel. CVV structure is due to the phonetic lengthening of vowels word-finally.

== Morphology ==
=== Noun phrase ===
The noun phrase in Tinigua may contain pronouns, modifiers, quantifiers, and demonstratives, among others, and is structured as follows:

Tinigua noun phrase template
demonstrative	quantifier	possessor/noun	modifier

==== Nominal morphology ====
Nominal morphology in Tinigua is restricted to classifier and plural-marking endoclitics, the latter of which (=ha) may occur outside of the noun phrase, and the associative plural suffix.

jɨsɨ=tʰo ɲɨ́w=tʰo
canoe=CLF:sturdy be.small=CLF:sturdy
‘little canoe’

kʰakʰá nɨzɨ́=ha jitʰátʰako=ha
{here(this one)} boy=PL be.hungry=PL
‘These boys here are hungry.’

The morpheme handá (also endi ~ anda ~ andej) is used to mark subject noun phrases in clauses.

hawá-je, ɲaǃ endi hatsamí-j ɲísa
say-VSUFF here SBJ be.white-VSUFF woman
'"Here you go, (have this)!" the white woman said.'

== Vocabulary ==
=== Comparison ===
Below is a comparison of Tinigua forms elicited from Sixto Muñoz in 2019 compared with Tinigua and Pamigua words recorded in Castellví (1940).

English gloss	Tinigua (Sixto Muñoz)	Tinigua (Castellví)	Pamigua (Castellví)
eye	sɨ́ti	zőti, zə̀ti	sete, xete
water	ɲikʷájtʃi	ñikwáiši	nikagé
fire	hikʰítsa	ičísa	ekísa
woman	ɲísa	ñíza, ñísä	nixtá
dog	hanó	xamno, xámiu	xannó
jaguar	kʰíɲa ~ tʃíɲa	číña, ǰíña, xiña	xiñaga
corn	jóʔhá	t’óka, tióka	xukxá
manioc	komáha	xaačá	xoayoa
let's go	minahá	manaxǎí	menáxa
chili pepper	tsákʰa	ţáxa	saxa 'salt'
good	hajohási	ayuxáǐ	ayoxagua ‘good morning’
plantain	mandótʰa	madóxa	mandotá
spirit	hamajiéha	pan-kianóso	kinoxá ‘enemy’
man	tsɨtsía	psäţeyá	piksiga
five	tsátokʷahá (tsátho-kʷaʔa ‘left.side-hand’)	xopa-kuáxa	saksu-kuaxa
eleven	tapásaɲóha	čimatóse-kiésä	čipsé ipa-kiaxi

=== Swadesh list ===
Below is the 100-word Swadesh list for Tinigua.

Swadesh list for Tinigua
Number	Gloss	Tinigua
1	I	híkʷa
2	you (sg.)	kázɨ
3	we	hikʷáʔa ~ hikʷáha
4	this	hángi
5	that	híkʰá
6	who	nɨ́ʔa
7	what	kaɲígahe ~ kaɲí
8	not	hégʷa (negation particle)
9	all	tʰiána
10	many	hajusi ~ ajútsɨ ~ ajusi
11	one	kíʔ-je 'to be one, be first'
12	two	hatsajtʃa ~ hátsa
13	big	hajjúko
14	long	hatsɨ́ 'to be long, far, distant'
15	small	nɨ́o 'to be small'
16	woman	ɲísa
17	man	tsɨtsía
18	person	hanoso
19	fish	zɨsóha (pl.)
20	bird	tsɨtsáha (pl.)
21	dog	hanú
22	louse	hisía
23	tree	kíhi
24	seed	ɲihósea
25	leaf	kʰiwíha
26	root	kiʔtʰáha
27	bark	
28	skin	kʷátatsa
29	flesh	handá ɲisá
30	blood	hahájkʰía
31	bone	kʰitʰáh
32	grease	
33	egg	mákʰikʰí
34	horn	
35	tail	matsíɸʷajtʃa
36	feather	hatsówi
37	hair	zozíha
38	head	jɨéte
39	ear	tʃátsɨtoa
40	eye	sɨ́ti
41	nose	kʰízɨsɨ
42	mouth	kíwa
43	tooth	jióto
44	tongue	tʰinútsa
45	claw	
46	foot	sɨ́kina
47	knee	tʰízɨsa
48	hand	kʷáʔana
49	belly	jamako
50	neck	
51	breasts	jáʔzɨná
52	heart	jihéʔ
53	liver	máʔzɨʔná
54	(to) drink	jaɲekʷá
55	eat	jiʔú
56	bite	hakʷɨ́
57	see	ɲɨnzɨ́
58	hear	kʰahá
59	know	kʰahá
60	sleep	ɲiná
61	die	ɲimá
62	kill	pakʷá
63	swim	ɲisɨ́
64	(to) fly	jakʷjní
65	walk	kiwá
66	come	nakú
67	lie (down)	hatʃí
68	sit	hútʰjoí
69	stand	
70	give	nahánika
71	say	jajé hawá (also 'think')
72	sun	ɲíɸo
73	moon	hatsɨ́ ɲíɸo
74	star	ʋṍsa
75	water	ɲikʷájtʃe
76	rain	hatʰokútʃe
77	stone	ɲitsátsa
78	sand	tʃipawína
79	earth	towána
80	cloud	haɲíj natʰí
81	smoke	sɨnátʰi
82	fire	hikʰítsa
83	ash	
84	(to) burn	kʰaɸʷá
85	path	nátsɨ
86	mountain	
87	red	hatsambá 'to be red'
88	green	hasɨtsá 'to be green'
89	yellow	hasaná 'to be yellow'
90	white	hatsamá
91	black	hatʃandá 'to be black/dark'
92	night	hapɨ́jtʃa (also 'late')
93	hot	hanzá 'to be hot'
94	cold	hotsɨ́
95	full	hajítʰo
96	new	
97	good	hajohási ~ ajohási
98	round	
99	dry	hapawú 'to be dry'
100	name	jawú 'to be called/named'
