= List of Colombian departments by population =

This is a list of Colombian departments by population according to a general census taken in 2018, the 2005 census, and by estimates for 2020 made by the National Administrative Department of Statistics (Spanish: Departamento Administrativo Nacional de Estadística). The five most populous departments contain almost half of the total population.

Rank	Department	Population (2020)	Population (2018)	Population (2005)
1	Bogotá	7,743,955	7,412,566	6,778,691
2	Antioquia	6,677,930	6,407,102	5,601,507
3	Valle del Cauca	4,532,152	4,475,886	4,052,535
4	Cundinamarca	3,242,999	2,919,060	2,228,682
5	Atlántico	2,722,128	2,535,517	2,112,001
6	Santander	2,280,908	2,184,837	1,913,444
7	Bolívar	2,180,976	2,070,110	1,836,640
8	Nariño	1,627,589	1,630,592	1,498,234
9	Córdoba	1,828,947	1,784,783	1,462,909
10	Tolima	1,339,998	1,330,187	1,312,304
11	Cauca	1,491,937	1,464,488	1,182,022
12	Norte de Santander	1,620,318	1,491,689	1,208,336
13	Boyacá	1,242,731	1,217,376	1,255,311
14	Magdalena	1,427,026	1,341,746	1,136,819
15	Huila	1,122,622	1,100,386	1,001,476
16	Cesar	1,295,387	1,200,574	878,437
17	Caldas	1,018,453	998,255	898,490
18	Meta	1,063,454	1,039,722	713,772
19	La Guajira	965,718	880,560	655,943
20	Risaralda	961,055	943,401	859,666
21	Sucre	949,252	904,863	762,263
22	Quindío	555,401	539,904	518,691
23	Chocó	544,764	534,826	388,476
24	Caquetá	410,521	401,849	337,932
25	Casanare	435,195	420,504	281,294
26	Putumayo	359,127	348,182	237,197
27	Arauca	294,206	262,174	153,028
28	Guaviare	86,657	82,767	56,758
29	San Andrés y Providencia	63,692	61,280	59,573
30	Amazonas	79,020	76,589	46,950
31	Vichada	112,958	107,808	44,592
32	Vaupés	44,712	40,797	19,943
33	Guainía	50,636	48,114	18,797

== See also ==
- Colombia
- Demographics of Colombia
- List of Colombian municipalities by population
