= Mitú =

- City and municipality
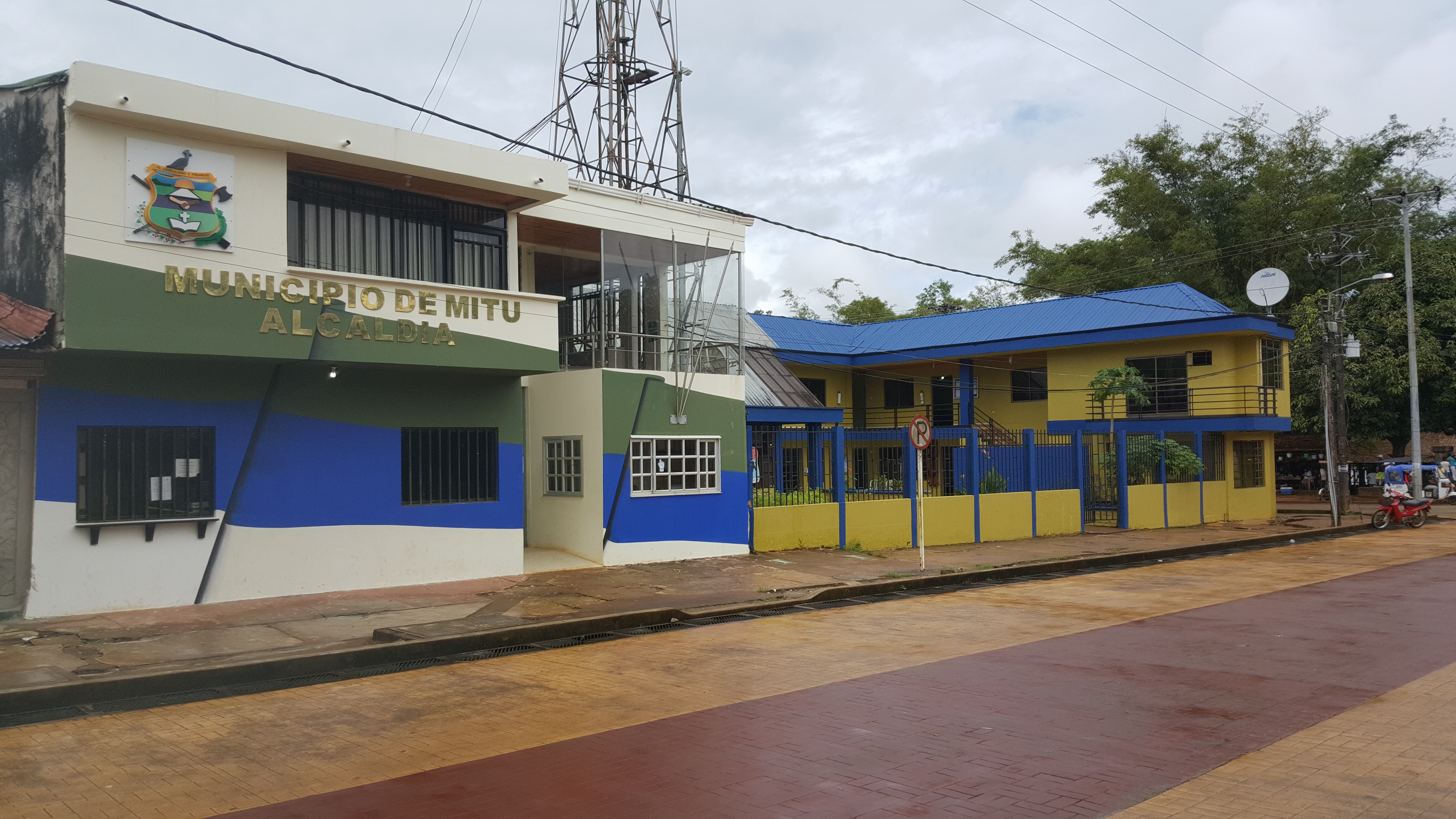
- View of Mitú

- Flag Coat of arms

- Location of the town and municipality of Mitú in the Department of Vaupés.

- Location within Colombia
- Coordinates: 1°11′54″N 70°10′24″W
- Country: Colombia
- Region: Amazonía
- Department: Vaupés
- Founded: 1936

Government
  - Mayor: Carlos Iván Ramiro Meléndez Moreno (L)

Area
  - Total: 16.422 km^{2} (6.341 sq mi)
- Elevation: 183 m (600 ft)

Population (2018)
  - Total: 29,850
  - Density: 1,818/km^{2} (4,708/sq mi)
- Demonym: Mituense
- Time zone: UTC-05:00 (COT)
- Area code: 57 + 8
- Climate: Af
- Website: Official website (in Spanish)

Mitú (Spanish pronunciation: [miˈtu]; Cubeo: Ãrucuibo) is the capital town of the department of Vaupés in Colombia. It is a small town located in South eastern Colombia in the Amazon Basin. Founded in 1936, Mitú lies next to the Vaupés River at 180 meters above sea level. It is where the core of the services (transport and trade) are provided to the Vaupés Department.

The Vaupés River serves as connecting link between Mitú and nearby hamlets on the riverbanks, but there are no roads connecting the town to rest of the country. Accessible only by airplane and the river, Mitú is the most isolated capital in Colombia.

== History ==
The founding of Mitú can be traced to the rivalry between Brazilians and Colombians exploiting rubber in the basins and ranges of the upper Guainía and Apaporis rivers. By 1903 there was an intense activity exploiting rubber in the area around the Vaupés river using the local Indians, of the ethnic groups tucano and carijonas, as slaves.

Mitú was erected as a modest hamlet in October 1936 by Miguel Cuervo Araoz. The town served as a meeting point between different indigenous communities, in addition to being a center of rubber tree exploitation, fur trade and missionary center. Its main activity was the rubber trade for food, clothing and fuel. After being for a time a township, in 1963 Mitú became the capital of the Vaupés Commissary (Comisaria). In 1974, it was made a municipality and in 1991 it became the capital of the new created department.

In November 1998, an estimated 1,500 FARC guerrilla members of the Eastern Bloc of the FARC-EP tried to take over the town by force, against 120 National Police members and one Colombian National Army Battalion in the Siege of Mitú. The Colombian Air Force and Army Aviation supported ground forces with air raids. The guerilla members seized the airport, and they blew up a communications tower. Mitú was left partially destroyed and some estimated 150 policemen and soldiers died, along with 10 civilians and over 800 guerrilla members. In their escape FARC took hostages as human shields including some 40 to 45 members of the Colombian Military.

On June 13 2010, two of the hostages captured in Mitú in 1998, National Police Col. (now Gen.) Luis Mendieta and National Police Col. Enrique Murillo were freed by the Colombian army in a rescue operation named Operation Chameleon, located in Calamar, Guaviare. The following day, two other police officers were found and freed.

== Climate ==
Mitú has a tropical rainforest climate (Köppen Af) and is hot, humid and wet throughout the year.

Climate data for Mitú
Month	Jan	Feb	Mar	Apr	May	Jun	Jul	Aug	Sep	Oct	Nov	Dec	Year
Record high °C (°F)	34.0 (93.2)	34.6 (94.3)	34.5 (94.1)	33.8 (92.8)	32.8 (91.0)	32.1 (89.8)	32.1 (89.8)	32.6 (90.7)	33.7 (92.7)	33.5 (92.3)	34.1 (93.4)	33.2 (91.8)	34.6 (94.3)
Mean daily maximum °C (°F)	31.3 (88.3)	31.5 (88.7)	32.0 (89.6)	31.2 (88.2)	29.2 (84.6)	29.5 (85.1)	29.2 (84.6)	30.1 (86.2)	30.8 (87.4)	30.6 (87.1)	31.0 (87.8)	30.9 (87.6)	30.6 (87.1)
Daily mean °C (°F)	26.4 (79.5)	26.3 (79.3)	26.5 (79.7)	26.4 (79.5)	25.6 (78.1)	25.2 (77.4)	25.1 (77.2)	25.7 (78.3)	25.9 (78.6)	26.3 (79.3)	25.9 (78.6)	26.3 (79.3)	26.0 (78.7)
Mean daily minimum °C (°F)	20.1 (68.2)	20.2 (68.4)	21.3 (70.3)	21.1 (70.0)	21.3 (70.3)	21.5 (70.7)	19.9 (67.8)	20.5 (68.9)	20.8 (69.4)	21.0 (69.8)	21.1 (70.0)	19.9 (67.8)	20.7 (69.3)
Record low °C (°F)	17.4 (63.3)	17.2 (63.0)	19.2 (66.6)	17.8 (64.0)	19.6 (67.3)	19.0 (66.2)	16.5 (61.7)	16.8 (62.2)	16.1 (61.0)	18.0 (64.4)	19.0 (66.2)	16.6 (61.9)	16.1 (61.0)
Average rainfall mm (inches)	257.1 (10.12)	209.5 (8.25)	228.8 (9.01)	331.2 (13.04)	381.5 (15.02)	373.6 (14.71)	385.4 (15.17)	301.2 (11.86)	241.0 (9.49)	234.0 (9.21)	219.0 (8.62)	193.3 (7.61)	3,355.6 (132.11)
Average rainy days	13	13	15	19	22	21	23	20	16	15	17	16	210
Mean monthly sunshine hours	139.2	106.7	125.1	113.1	106.4	100.6	110.2	129.8	131.5	127.9	121.8	120.4	1,432.7
Source: Instituto de Hidrologia Meteorologia y Estudios Ambientales

== Fabio Alberto León Bentley Airport ==
Fabio Alberto León Bentley Airport Aeropuerto Fabio Alberto León Bentley
- IATA: MVP; ICAO: SKMU

Summary
- Airport type: Public
- Location: Mitú, Colombia
- Elevation AMSL: 680 ft (210 m)
- Coordinates: 1°15′25″N 70°14′0″W

Map
- Location of airport in Colombia

Runways
Direction	Length		Surface
Direction	m	ft	Surface
02/20	1,880	6,168	Asphalt
- Sources: GCM

Fabio Alberto León Bentley Airport (Spanish: Aeropuerto Fabio Alberto León Bentley) (IATA: MVP, ICAO: SKMU) is an airport serving Mitú in the Vaupés Department of Colombia. It is next to the Vaupés River and runs along the entire length of the city. It has an asphalt runway sufficient for medium-sized passenger jets and military transport aircraft.

=== Airlines and destinations ===
Airlines	Destinations
SATENA	Bogotá, Villavicencio

=== Accidents and incidents ===
- On 17 February 1977, Douglas C-47B FAC-1125 of SATENA was damaged beyond economic repair in a take-off accident. All 28 people on board survived.
- On 5 May 2010, SATENA Flight 9634, an Embraer ERJ-145 overran the runway. The aircraft crashed through the airport fence and then came to rest in a field, suffering substantial damage. None of the 37 passengers and 4 crew were injured or killed. The runway at the time of the accident was wet as it had recently rained in the area.
