= Acaricuara =

- Corregimiento and town
- Location in Colombia
- Coordinates: 0°42′N 70°14′W
- Country: Colombia
- Department: Vaupés Department

Population (2012)
  - Total: 430
- Time zone: UTC-5 (Colombia Standard Time)

Acaricuara is a town and corregimiento located in the Vaupés Department, Republic of Colombia.
