= List of Colombian departments by area =

Colombian departments arranged by area

The list of Colombian departments by area lists the departments of Colombia according to their respective areas.

== Ranked by area total size ==
#	Department	Area (km²)
1	Amazonas	109,497
2	Vichada	100,063
3	Caquetá	88,965
4	Meta	82,830
5	Guainía	71,289
6	Antioquia	62,809
7	Guaviare	55,544
8	Vaupés	53,299
9	Chocó	48,353
10	Casanare	44,394
11	Nariño	33,268
12	Cauca	29,308
13	Santander	30,562
14	Bolívar	26,720
15	Putumayo	24,885
16	Córdoba	25,086
17	Tolima	24,140
18	Arauca	23,851
19	Boyacá	23,138
20	Magdalena	23,136
21	Cesar	22,565
22	Cundinamarca	22,370
23	Norte de Santander	21,857
24	Valle del Cauca	20,666
25	La Guajira	20,619
26	Huila	18,142
27	Sucre	10,592
28	Caldas	7,425
29	Risaralda	4,140
30	Atlántico	3,388
31	Quindío	1,934
32	Bogotá, Distrito Capital	1,623
33	San Andrés and Providencia	49
