= Tiniguan languages =

Moribund language family of Colombia

Tiniguan
- Tiniwan, Pamiguan
- Geographic distribution: Colombia
- Linguistic classification: One of the world's primary language families
- Subdivisions: Tinigua; Pamigua †; Majigua † (unattested)

Language codes
- Glottolog: None

The Tiniguan languages are one or two extinct and one moribund language of Colombia that form a small family.

Jolkesky (2016) also notes that there are lexical similarities with Andaqui.

== Languages ==
The Tiniwan languages are:

- Tinigua (Tiniwa)
- Pamigua (Pamiwa) †
- ?Majigua †

Nothing is known about Majigua. It was once spoken on the Ariari River in the Meta region of Colombia.

== Classification ==
Though data on Pamigua is extremely limited, the relationship seems to be fairly close: Tinigua manaxaí 'walk!', Pamigua menáxa 'let's go!'.

gloss	Tinigua	Pamigua
'eye'	zəti, zuti	sete
'man'	psätseyá	piksiga
'woman'	ñíza	ništá
'water'	ñikwáiši	nikagé
'fire'	ičísa	ekisá
'dog'	šámno	šannó
'jaguar'	žíña	šiñaga
'maize'	tʸoka	šukšá
'eleven'	čimatóse-kiésä	čipse ipa-kiaši
