= Siege of Mitú =

1998 rebel Colombian conflict siege

- Part of the Colombian conflict
Date	November 1–4, 1998
Location	Mitú, Colombia
Result	Occupation of the town by guerrillas; Destruction of much of Mitú by FARC; Colombian reinforcements quell attack four days later

Belligerents
FARC	Military Forces of Colombia; Colombian police

Commanders and leaders
	Luis Peña (executed); Julián Ernesto Guevara (POW); Luis Mendieta (POW); Enrique Murillo (POW)

Strength
~1,500	120

Casualties and losses
800 (killed by Colombian reinforcements)	~31–150 estimated; 31 confirmed; 61 abducted
- 11+ civilians killed by FARC; 40 buildings destroyed

From 3 to 5 November 1998 during the Colombian conflict, rebels belonging to the Revolutionary Armed Forces of Colombia (FARC) laid siege to the Colombian village of Mitú, Vaupés Department.

== Attack ==
On 1 November 1998, left-wing FARC guerillas launched an assault on the village (which is also the regional capital of Vaupés Department), FARC entered the city, taking over the aerodrome as they entered the fortified police station. The police had only 120 officers, making them outnumbered and overwhelmed by the 1,500 FARC militants. Casualties were heavy, and many policemen were taken hostage. Officer César Augusto Lasso recalled seeing 18 of his colleagues being killed by rebels.

The entire town fell under FARC control, which tried to cut off all communication with the outside world. Mitú, which is inaccessible to reach by land, had virtually all its communications severed. The last radio message was on 2 PM on 1 November, and only one plane, a Colombian Red Cross aircraft that managed to evacuate 4 injured youths ranging in age from 3 to 20 years old, was allowed to enter the village.

On 4 November, Colombian troops sent 500 reinforcements into Mitú, which crossed through Brazilian territory, which Brazil said was an illegal action. Mitú was retaken and over 800 guerillas were estimated to have been killed during the counter-offensive.

At least 37 soldiers and police officers were confirmed to have been killed. Other sources estimate that 43 were killed, and the local hospital put the toll at 150. At least 11 civilians, including a 19-year old teenager, were also killed by FARC. After the battle FARC soldiers were also reported to have executed many of the 61 people they had captured, including mayor Luis Peña after he complained about his living conditions. Soldier César Augusto Lasso was not released until 2014, making him FARC's longest-held hostage.

Much of Mitú was destroyed during the battle. Historian Harvey F. Kline says that at least 40 buildings, including a courthouse and a hospital were destroyed by FARC and 200 explosives were detonated. The United States Department of State said that guerillas had destroyed entire city blocks, "including private homes, a church, and a school."
