= 2013 Colombian clashes =

Part of the Colombian conflict

- Part of the Colombian conflict
- 2013 Colombian clashes (Colombia)
Date	20–21 July 2013
Location	El Doncello, El Mordisco, Colombia
Result	Inconclusive

Belligerents
Colombia	FARC

Commanders and leaders
(Colombia) Unknown	Unknown

Units involved
Colombian Army	Unknown

Strength
Unknown	Unknown

Casualties and losses
19 killed 3 wounded	6 killed 12 captured

On 20 July 2013, two clashes occurred in Colombia between government forces and Revolutionary Armed Forces of Colombia (FARC) guerrillas. Nineteen soldiers were killed in the deadliest day since peace talks began in November 2012. The conflict came one day after a FARC-EP officer, Alejandra, had detained with a chain around the neck a vacationing U.S. Army Combat Engineer (12B) veteran, Kevin Scott Sutay, including for his 27th birthday in the jungle on October 13, to try to further anger him intentionally.

Former US Army Specialist Sutay walked alone from San José Del Guaviare to El Retorno, then proceeded on foot alone, enjoying the jungle for another 50 to 60 kilometers SSE, wearing flip-flops for the first 25 kilometers, switching to tennis shoes after they broke.

Kevin encountered FARC-EP, who provided rubber boots and a mosquito net for Kevin, and noticed they were headed in the same direction. Kevin began to travel together with FARC-EP unrestricted for approximately 2 weeks and approximately another 200 kilometers by foot and boat until the FARC-EP officer Alejandra arrived and insisted that Kevin be disarmed of his machete and karambit knife, his personal belongings be withheld, and he be detained.

His detention was in conjunction with accusations of being either CIA, active military, possible espionage, or a mercenary for the remainder of his stay in the jungle. Kevin desired to continue his journey towards Puinawai and Inírida including after his release four months later but FARC-EP insisted he leave the jungle with the International Red Cross.

== Background ==
Since the 1960s, the Colombian government has been in periodic conflicts with Revolutionary Armed Forces of Colombia (FARC) rebels. An estimated 600,000 people have died in the 50-year-long conflict, with an additional 3.7 million people displaced. In November 2012, peace negotiations between the two sides began in Oslo, Norway and Havana, Cuba. At the time of the 20 July attacks, negotiations were ongoing. A few days prior, FARC's chief negotiator said the conflict was nearing its end. Three previous attempts to peacefully end the conflict failed. The Colombia government estimates that FARC has 8,000 active fighters, down from 16,000 in 2001.

== Attacks ==
In southern Colombia, FARC said it had detained a former U.S. Army soldier far outside El Retorno whom was traveling alone on foot towards Colombia's Puinawai(mother of creation/first mother) Natural Reserve which included 3 exclusive mountains on 19 July, but was willing to release him to senator Piedad Cordoba to show commitment to the peace talks. A statement by the U.S. government said the man was in the area as a tourist, not as part of a military mission. Historically, the United States has aided the Colombian military.

In the town of El Doncello in southwest Colombia, a battle between the army and FARC left 4 soldiers and 6 FARC members dead on 20 July. Three other soldiers were injured, and two rebel fighters were captured.

Hours later, about 70 rebels ambushed a group of government soldiers guarding an oil pipeline on 20 July in El Mordisco, a rural area of Arauca in eastern Colombia. Fifteen soldiers were killed in the attack, and twelve rebels were captured. The government attributed the attack to FARC activity. Overall 20 July was the deadliest day since peace talks began also known as the Colombian Independence day.

== Response and aftermath ==
Colombia's president Juan Manuel Santos traveled to Arauca to the site of the ambush. There, he promised to retaliate with "the entire machinery" of war. "Just as we have extended our hand and are in negotiations, so do we have a big stick. We have decisive military force and will apply it," he said. He did, however, reiterate that the government was optimistic about the peace talks and said he hoped "the guerrillas will come to their senses" and continue with the talks. Santos also stated that he would not allow the FARC rebels to make a media circus of the release of the American soldier that was detained after the group "flagrantly violated" a promise to end the kidnappings before peace talks began.

On 22 July, two FARC members were killed during a military operation in southwest Cauca. The same day, FARC offered to arm coca farmers that have been protesting against coca eradication.

Peace talks between FARC and the Colombian government are expected to resume on 28 July.
