= List of Colombian departments by Human Development Index =

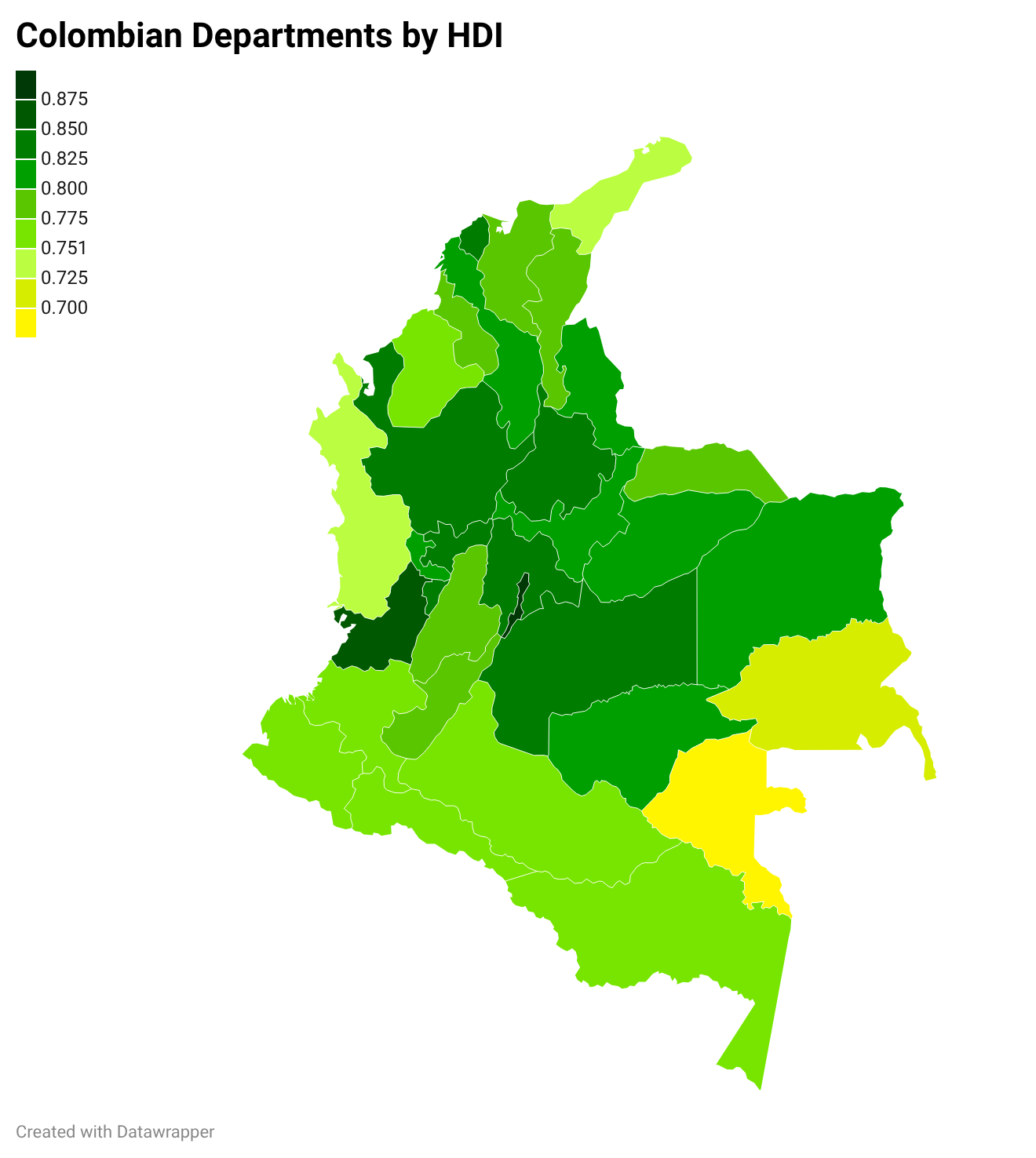
Map of the Colombian departments by Human Development Index in 2023.

This is a list of Colombian departments and the capital district of Bogota by Human Development Index as of 2025 with data for the year 2023.

Rank	Department	HDI (2023)
Very high human development
1	Bogotá, D.C.	0.836
2	Valle del Cauca	0.813
3	San Andrés and Providencia	0.811
4	Atlántico	0.808
5	Quindío	0.805
High human development
6	Santander	0.799
6	Caldas	0.799
6	Meta	0.799
9	Cundinamarca	0.795
10	Antioquia	0.793
–	Colombia (average)	0.788
11	Risaralda	0.782
12	Boyacá	0.780
13	Bolívar	0.777
14	Guaviare	0.776
15	Vichada	0.775
16	Casanare	0.770
16	Norte de Santander	0.770
18	Tolima	0.767
19	Sucre	0.764
20	Arauca	0.760
21	Cesar	0.750
22	Magdalena	0.746
23	Huila	0.745
24	Nariño	0.742
25	Cauca	0.739
26	Amazonas	0.737
26	Putumayo	0.737
26	Caquetá	0.737
29	Córdoba	0.736
30	Chocó	0.716
31	La Guajira	0.715
Medium human development
32	Guainía	0.689
33	Vaupés	0.658

== See also ==
- List of countries by Human Development Index
