= Villa Fátima =

Coordinates: 0.9727°N 69.9500°W

- Corregimiento and town
- Interactive map of Villa Fátima
- Country: Colombia
- Department: Vaupés Department
- Time zone: UTC-5 (Colombia Standard Time)

Villa Fátima (Cubeo: Ãmecãpido) is a town and corregimiento located in the Vaupés Department of the Republic of Colombia.
