= Pamigua language =

Extinct language of Colombia

Pamigua
- Native to: Colombia
- Region: Meta Department
- Extinct: c. 1930s
- Language family: Tiniguan: Pamigua

Language codes
- ISO 639-3: None (mis)
- Glottolog: pami1248

Pamigua (sometimes called Pamiwa) is an extinct language of Colombia, related to Tinigua. It was spoken at the mission of San Concepción de Arama in Meta Department, Colombia.

== Vocabulary ==
Pamigua vocabulary
gloss	Pamigua
eye	sete, xete
water	nikagé
fire	ekísa
woman	nixtá
dog	xannó
jaguar	xiñaga
corn	xukxá
manioc	xoayoa
let's go	menáxa
chile pepper	saxa
good morning	ayoxagua
plantain	mandotá
enemy	kinoxá
man	piksiga
five	saksu-kuaxa
eleven	čipsé ipa-kiaxi

=== Ernst (1891) ===
Pamigua vocabulary
gloss	Pamigua
god	chimaja, chuimaja
man	picsiga
woman	nixtá
boy	mecvé
girl	nixtá-mecvé
spirit	amayijagá
body	gocuá
head	blusteá
fire	equisá
water	nicagué
salt	saja
let's go	menája
good morning, good night	ayojagua
friend	comijaguiga
enemy	quinojá
band-tailed guan	nontacá
jaguar	jiñagá
banana	mandotá
manioc	joayoa
corn	jucjá
dog	jannó
eye	sete (jete?)
one	chijance
two	sajancesá
three	sajance, sanchicanse
four	chijastijance
five	saksu-kuaxa
six	coadsucuaja ayipaquiaji
seven	sabsepsa ayipaquiaji
eight	sabsepsa chibsuaja
nine	chiastipsa ipaquiaji
ten	patsucuaja ipaquiaji
eleven	chipsé ipaquiaji
twenty	cinchiná ipaquiaji
