= Cubeo language =

Language spoken by the Cubeo people

Cubeo
- pãmié
- Native to: Brazil, Colombia
- Ethnicity: Cubeo
- Native speakers: 6,300 (2009)
- Language family: Tucanoan: Central; Cubeo

Language codes
- ISO 639-3: cub
- Glottolog: cube1242
- ELP: Kubeo
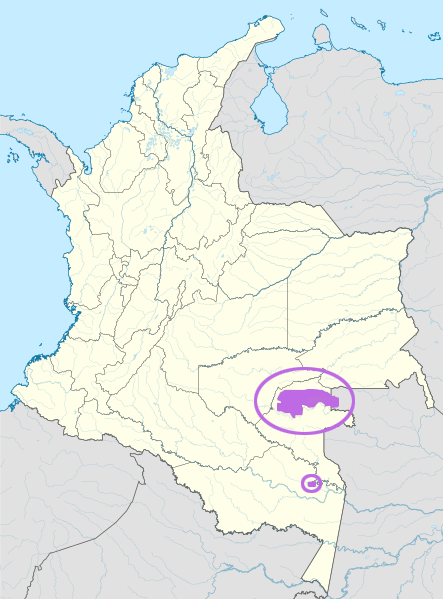

The Cubeo language (also spelled Cuveo) is the language spoken by the Cubeo people in the Vaupés Department, the Cuduyari and Querarí Rivers and their tributaries in Colombia, and in Brazil and Venezuela. It is a member of the central branch of the Tucanoan languages. Cubeo has borrowed a number of words from the Nadahup languages, and its grammar has apparently been influenced by Arawak languages. The language has been variously described as having a subject–object–verb or an object–verb–subject word order, the latter very rare cross-linguistically. It is sometimes called Pamiwa, the ethnic group's autonym, but it is not to be confused with the Pamigua language, sometimes called Pamiwa.

== Phonology ==
=== Vowels ===
There are six oral vowels and six nasal vowels. /ɨ/ is pronounced as in roses.

	Front		Central		Back	
High	i	ĩ	ɨ	ɨ̃	u	ũ
Low	ɛ	ɛ̃	a	ã	o	õ

=== Consonants ===
		Labial	Alveolar	Palatal	Velar
Stop	voiced	b	d		
Stop	voiceless	p	t	tʃ	k
Continuant		w	r	j	x

Unusually, Cubeo has a velar fricative /x/ but no strident fricative /s/. When older Cubeos use Spanish loans with /s/, they pronounce it as /tʃ/ before vowels. The /s/ deletes in word-final position in loans as in [xeˈtʃu] < Sp. Jesús [xeˈsus] 'Jesus' (cf. Colombian Spanish [heˈsus]).

=== Stress ===
The stressed syllable is the first syllable with high tone in the phonological word (usually the second syllable of the word). Stress (and by extension, the position of the first high-tone syllable) is contrastive.

=== Nasality ===
Most morphemes belong to one of three categories:

1. Nasal (many roots, as well as suffixes like -xã 'associative')
2. Oral (many roots, as well as suffixes like -pe 'similarity', -du 'frustrative')
3. Unmarked (only suffixes, e.g. -RE 'in/direct object')

No root is unmarked with respect to this nasal/oral division, but some roots are partially oral and nasal, /bãˈkaxa-/ [mãˈkaxa-] 'to defecate'.

Suffixes that begin with consonants without nasal allophones may be only nasal or oral, not unmarked, but suffixes that begin with consonants that have nasal allophones (/b, d, j, w, x, r/) may belong to any of the three classes above. It is impossible to predict the class to which a nasalizable consonant-initial suffix may belong.

There are some suffixes that are partially oral and partially nasal, like -kebã 'suppose'. There is no case in modern Cubeo in which -kebã is divided into separate oral and nasal suffixes.

==== Nasal assimilation ====
Nasality spreads rightward from the nasal vowel, nasalizing all oral vowels within a word if they are not nasal and all intervening consonants can be nasalized (/b, d, j, w, x, r/)

bu-bI-ko
/buˈe-bi-ko/
[buˈebiko]
'She recently studied.'

Unlike the previous example, in the next one, nasality spreads from the initial vowel to the following one, but it is blocked from the third syllable by a non-nasalizable /k/:

dĩ-bI-ko
/dĩ-bĩ-ko/
[nĩmĩko]
'She recently went.'

Nasal spreading is blocked by underlyingly oral suffixes or vowels that are underlyingly oral in a nasal/oral morpheme.

== Writing system ==
Cubeo alphabet
a	ã	b	c	ch	d	ꟈ	e	ẽ
i	ĩ	j	m	n	ñ	o	õ	p
qu	r	t	u	ũ	ʉ	ʉ̃	v	y

Đ is used in its bowl-struck form, approximately ⟨ꟈ⟩.

== Bibliography ==
- Morse, Nancy L.; Maxwell, Michael B. (1999). Gramática del cubeo (PDF) (in Spanish). Trans. Bernardo Montes. Bogotá: Editorial Alberto Lleras Camargo. ISBN 978-958-9281-29-1.
- Chacon, Thiago Costa (2012). The phonology and morphology of Kubeo: the documentation, theory, and description of an Amazonian language (Ph.D. thesis). University of Hawaii at Manoa. hdl:10125/101344.
