= Guaviare Department =

Department of Colombia

Department of Guaviare Departamento del Guaviare
- Department
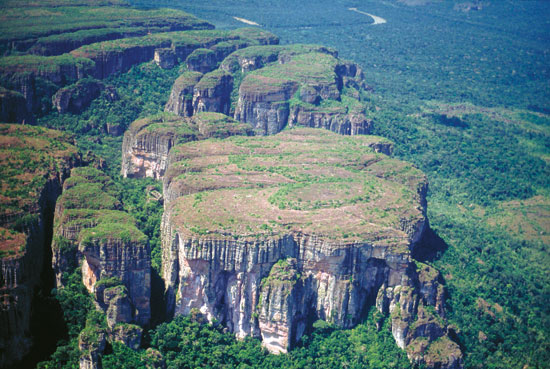
- Chiribiquete National Park

- Flag Coat of arms

- Guaviare shown in red

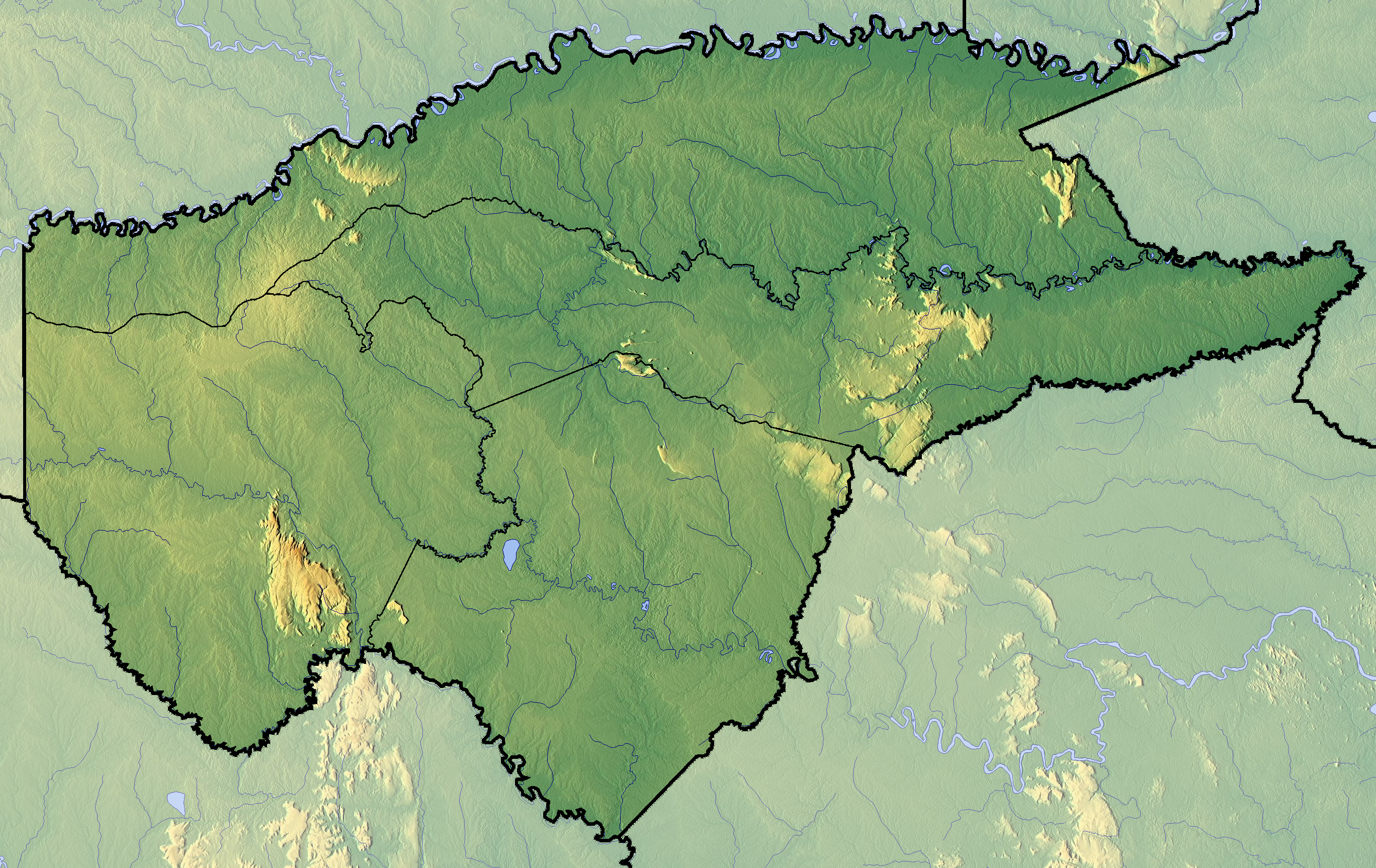
- Topography of the department
- Coordinates: 2°34′N 72°38′W
- Country: Colombia
- Region: Amazon Region
- Established: July 4, 1991
- Capital: San José del Guaviare

Government
  - Governor: Nebio De Jesus Echeverry Cadavid (2016–2019)

Area
  - Total: 53,460 km^{2} (20,640 sq mi)
  - Rank: 8th

Population (2018)
  - Total: 82,767
  - Rank: 28th
  - Density: 1.548/km^{2} (4.010/sq mi)

GDP
  - Total: COP 1,124 billion (US$ 0.3 billion)
- Time zone: UTC-05
- ISO 3166 code: CO-GUV
- HDI: 0.776 high · 14th of 33

Guaviare (Spanish pronunciation: [ɡwaˈβjaɾe]) is a department of Colombia. It is in the southern central region of the country. Its capital is San José del Guaviare. Guaviare was created on July 4, 1991, by the new Political Constitution of Colombia. Up until that point, it was a national territory that operated as a commissariat, segregated from territory of the then Commissariat of Vaupés on December 23, 1977.

== Municipalities ==
1. Calamar
2. El Retorno
3. Miraflores
4. San José del Guaviare

== History ==
Originally inhabited by the indigenous Nukak people, Guaviare was one of the regions colonized during the Amazon rubber boom of the 1910s and 1940s. Many families migrated from the centre of the country, seeking fast revenue and escaping from the bi-partisan violence taking place in other regions of Colombia. Nevertheless, the 'rubber fever' ended quickly, leaving the new inhabitants of Guaviare alone in an immense rainforest difficult to conquer. The boom of cocaine in the second half of the 20th century attracted new colonizers who migrated from other impoverished regions attracted by the coca revenues. Following this new wave of colonization, the territory started growing almost 30,000 hectares (74,000 acres) of coca per year. Several segments of Guaviare's territory were controlled by drug traffickers and the Revolutionary Armed Forces of Columbia (FARC) guerrilla group during this period in which violence was widespread and clashes between the factions of the Colombian armed conflict were constant. According to Colombia's Victims Unit, the conflict in Guaviare has had more than 93,000 victims since 1985, with more than 83,000 displaced and 6,612 dead.

The Colombian government's efforts to fight against coca cultivation have faced several difficulties. Aerial aspersion of glyphosate over the coca crops was suspended by a judicial order as it was potentially risky for the health of the inhabitants. Additionally, plans to replace coca with other crops have encountered legal, environmental, and economic restrains that limit their viability. None of these crops could match the level of profit that coca provided. The introduction of cattle to the region has reduced the farmers' dependence on coca by generating alternative sources of income. However, deforestation caused by cattle-ranching has led to droughts, fires, and loss of biodiversity.

The demobilization of the FARC in 2016 has led to the improvement of the living conditions in rural areas of Guaviare, although FARC dissident groups that did not demobilize still exert territorial control of some zones of the department.

== Demographics ==
Historical population
Year	Pop.	±%
1985	47,073	—
1993	97,602	+107.3%
2005	95,551	−2.1%
2018	82,767	−13.4%

=== Racial makeup ===
- Mestizo Colombians (90.09%)
- Afro-Colombians (5.86%)
- Indigenous peoples (4.05%)

The Nukak, a nomadic tribe that was uncontacted until 1988, live in Guaviare.
