= El Retorno =

Coordinates: 2.33056°N 72.6278°W

- Municipality and town
- Flag Coat of arms

- Location of the municipality and town of El Retorno in the Guaviare Department of Colombia.
- Country: Colombia
- Department: Guaviare Department

Population (Census 2018)
  - Total: 11,340
- Time zone: UTC-5 (Colombia Standard Time)
- Climate: Am

El Retorno is a town and municipality in the Guaviare Department, Colombia.
