= Calamar, Guaviare =

Coordinates: 1°55′14″N 72°33′15″W

- Municipality and town
- Flag

- Location of the municipality and town of Calamar, Guaviare in the Guaviare Department of Colombia.
- Country: Colombia
- Department: Guaviare Department
- Founded: 1890

Government
  - Mayor: Pedro Pablo Novoa Bernal

Area
  - Municipality and town: 16,200 km^{2} (6,300 sq mi)

Population (2015)
  - Municipality and town: 9,091
  - Density: 0.561/km^{2} (1.45/sq mi)
  - Metro: 5,305
- Time zone: UTC-5 (Colombia Standard Time)
- Climate: Am

Calamar is a town and municipality in the Guaviare Department, Colombia.

Ten former members of Revolutionary Armed Forces of Colombia (FARC) were killed in a military bombing on Calamar on March 3, 2021. Three “dissidents” were captured.
