= Vaupés Department =

Department of Colombia

Department of Vaupes Departamento del Vaupés
- Department
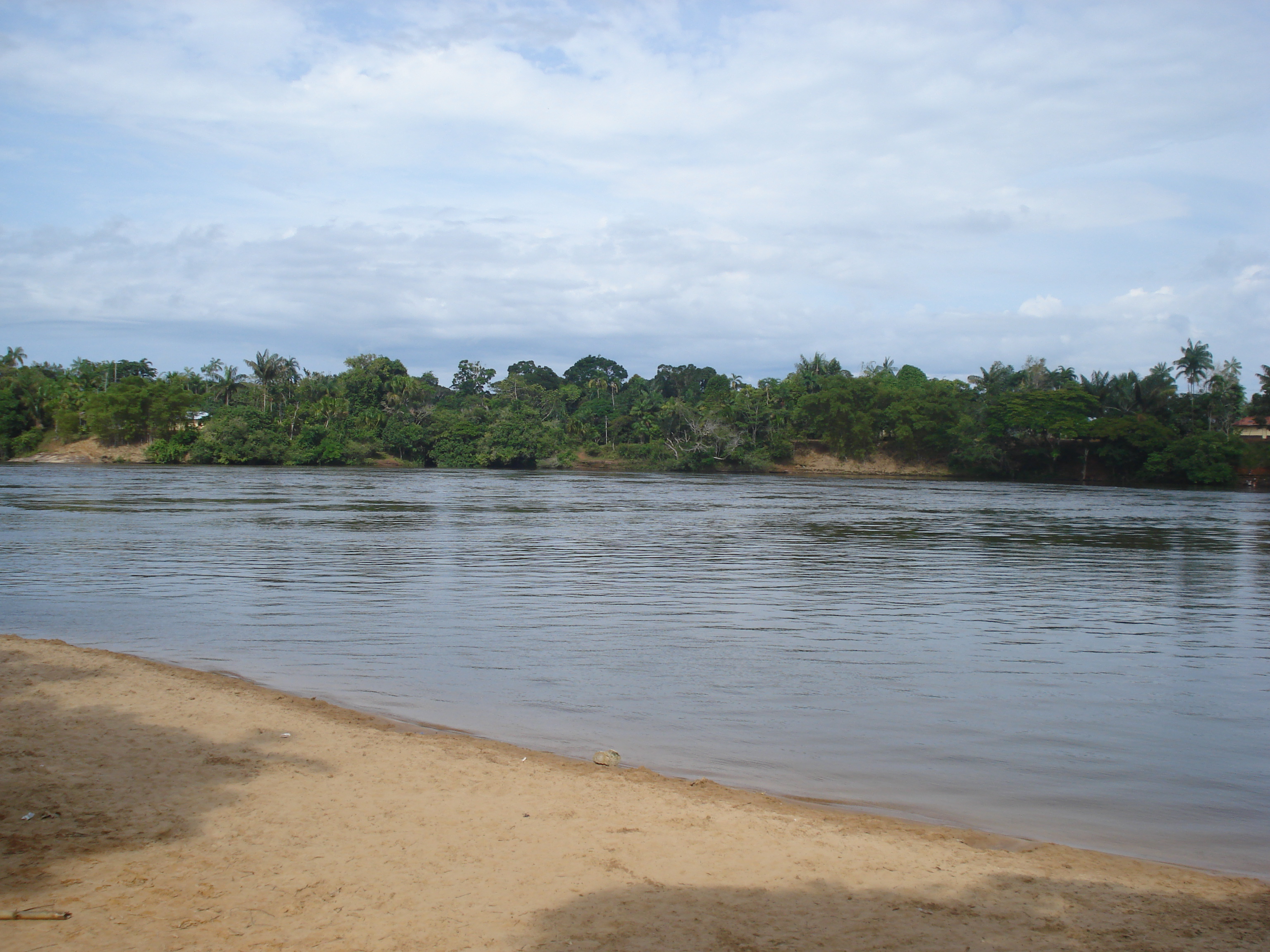
- Vaupés River

- Flag Coat of arms

- Vaupés shown in red

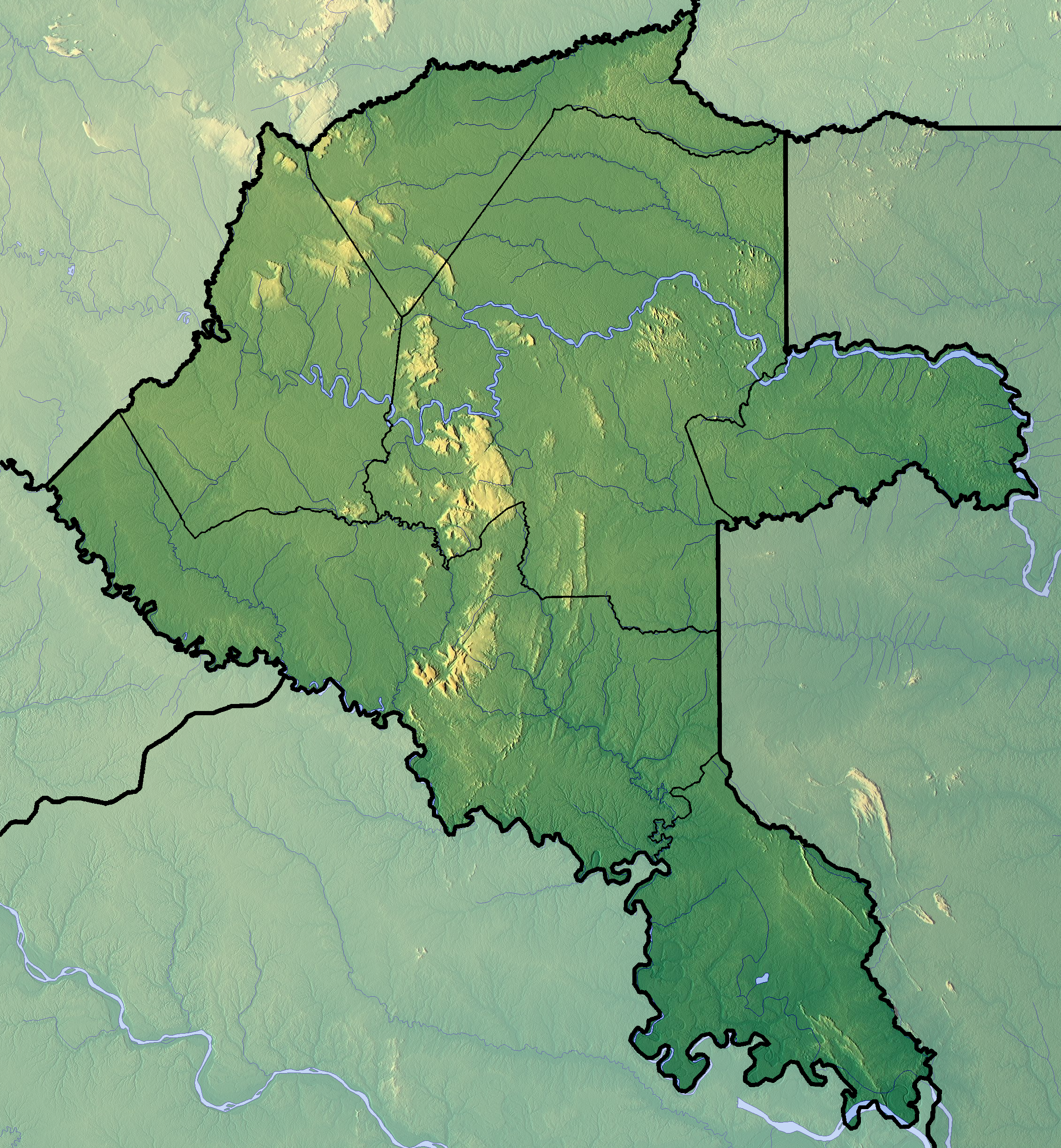
- Topography of the department
- Coordinates: 1°12′N 70°10′W
- Country: Colombia
- Region: Amazonía Region
- Established: July 4, 1991
- Capital: Mitú

Government
  - Governor: Luis Alfredo Gutierrez Garcia

Area
  - Total: 54,135 km^{2} (20,902 sq mi)
  - Rank: 7th

Population (2018)
  - Total: 40,797
  - Rank: 32nd
  - Density: 0.75362/km^{2} (1.9519/sq mi)

GDP
  - Total: COP 382 billion (US$ 0.1 billion)
- Time zone: UTC−05
- ISO 3166 code: CO-VAU
- Municipalities: 6
- HDI: 0.663 medium · 33rd of 33
- Website: www.vaupes.gov.co

Vaupés (Spanish pronunciation: [bawˈpes]) is a department of southeastern Colombia in the jungle covered Amazonía Region. It is located in the southeast part of the country, bordering Brazil to the east, the department of Amazonas to the south, Caquetá to the west, and Guaviare, and Guainía to the north; covering a total area of 54,135 km^{2}. Its capital is the town of Mitú. As of 2018, the population was 40,797, making it the least populous department in Colombia.

== History ==
During the colonization by the Spanish and first days of the first republic, the territory of Vaupes was part of the Province of Popayán, during the Greater Colombia. After the independence from Spain between 1821 and 1830 became part of the first version of the Boyacá Department. Between 1831 and 1857 the territory became part of the National Territory of Caquetá to later be part of the Sovereign State of Cauca. In 1886 became part of the then recently created Cauca Department.

With the expansion of the rubber industry and the industrial revolution, exploration for rubber reached the area bringing colonizers that altered and in some cases extinguished the majority of the indigenous population.

The territory was first made into a territorial division in 1910 and functioned as Commissaries (Comisarias) with the town of Calamar as capital (located in present-day Guaviare) but later moved to the town of Mitú to make an "act of presence" near the border with Brazil. In 1963 Guainía segregated from the Vaupes and became a commissary. In 1977, Guaviare followed the same path.

The department was created after the Colombian Constitution of 1991 which established it as a Department of Colombia on July 4, 1991.

== Economy ==
The department's main economic activities feature logging and fishing, with much exportation to neighboring Brazil.

== Demographics ==
The vast majority of the population consists of indigenous inhabitants. It is the least populated department in the country.

Historical population
Year	Pop.	±%
1973	23,250	—
1985	26,178	+12.6%
1993	24,671	−5.8%
2005	39,279	+59.2%
2018	40,797	+3.9%

== Transportation ==
Because of its location in the Amazon jungle, it has no roads connecting it with the rest of the country or internally from settlement to settlement, and commerce and contact with the outside world is achieved through travel along the main rivers and by means of air travel. Several of the small settlements have airstrips with service to the department's capital, Mitú, and from there with the rest of the country.

== Administrative divisions ==
Because of its small population and vast extension of land, Vaupés only has three municipalities. Other sections of the department were classified as special types of corregimientos, which has certain hybrid functions from a municipality and corregimiento.

=== Municipalities ===
1. Carurú
2. Mitú
3. Taraira

=== Department Corregimientos ===
1. Pacoa
2. Papunahua
3. Yavaraté

=== Municipal Corregimientos ===
1. Acaricuara
2. Villa Fátima

== See also ==
- Barasana-Eduria language
- Cubeo language
- Tucanoan languages
