= Riomar =

- Locality
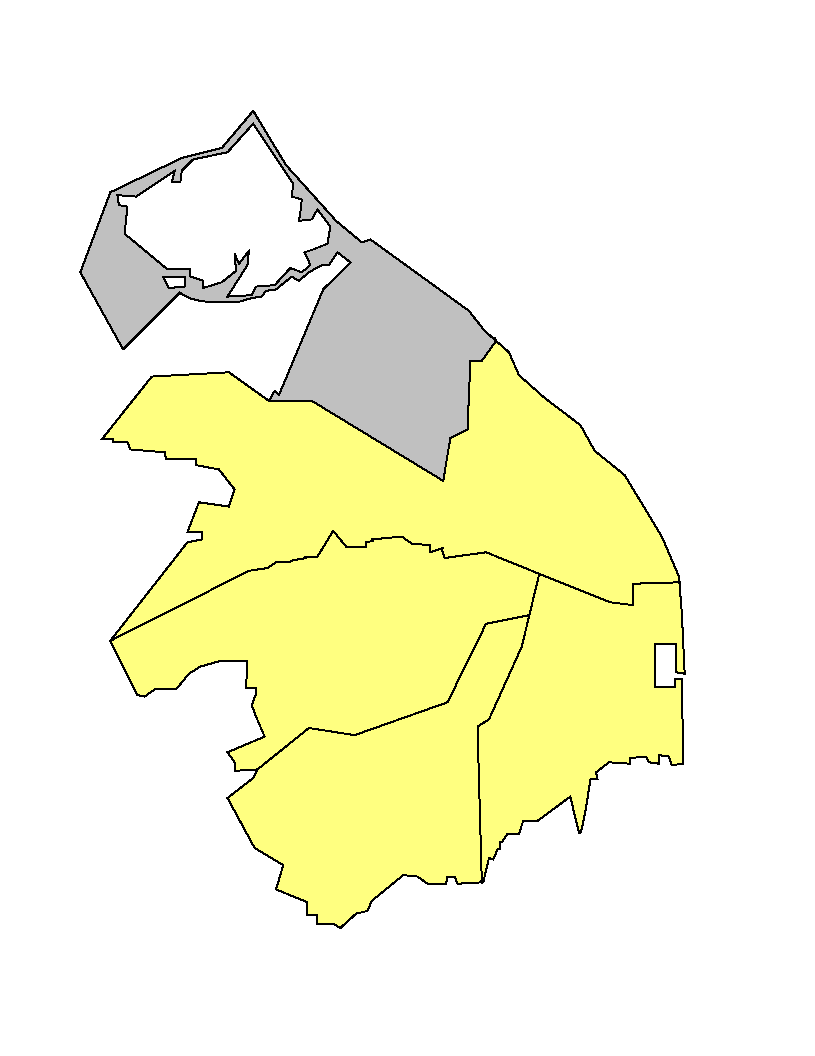
- Location of Riomar in Barranquilla
- Country: Colombia
- City district: Barranquilla
- HDI: High

Population
  - Total: 78,000

Riomar is locality in the north of Barranquilla city, Colombia. It gets its name from its proximity with the Caribbean Sea and the Magdalena River. Its boundaries are the "Calle 84" and the "Carrera 46".

== List of barrios ==
The locality has 25 neighborhoods and one township. Is manage for a local mayor and an Administrative Local Board integrate for 15 councilors.

| Villa Santos; El Poblado; Altamira; San Vicente; Altos del Limón; Altos de Riomar; Santa Mónica; Riomar; Andalucía; Villa Campestre; Las Flores; La Floresta; San Salvador | Siape; Las Tres Avemarías; Villa del Este; El Castillo; Solaire; Parte de Paraíso; El Limoncito; Parte de Altos del Prado; La Castellana; Villa Carolina |
