= Barrios and Localities of Barranquilla =

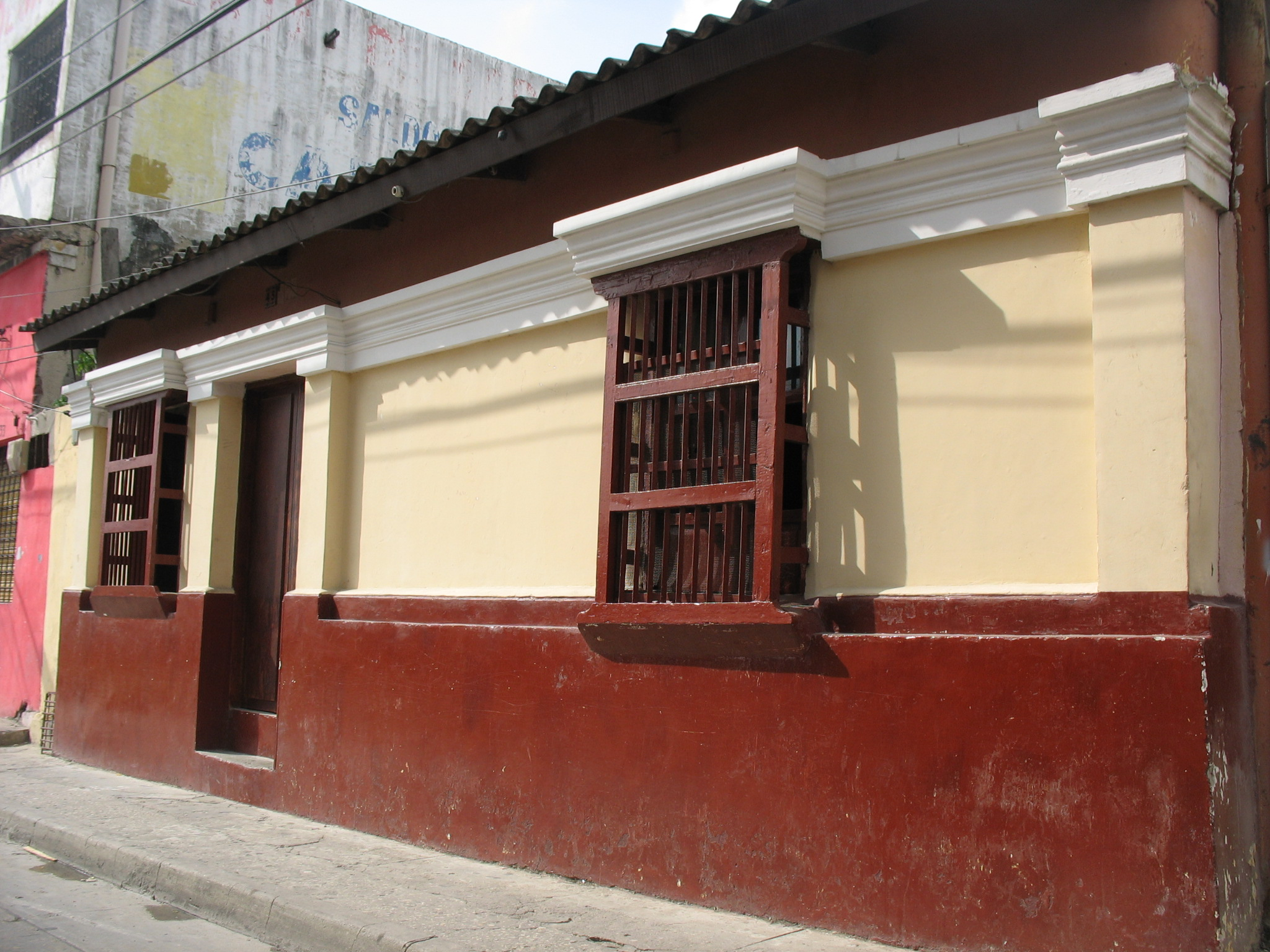
Typical house of Barrio Abajo.

The neighborhoods of Barranquilla are territorial divisions that make up the five locations into which the Colombian city is divided: South East, South West, North-Central Historical, Metropolitan and Riomar.

== List of neighborhoods in the localities ==
Riomar

Villa Santos; El Poblado; Altamira; San Vicente; Altos del Limón; Altos de Riomar; Santa Mónica; Riomar; Andalucía; Villa Campestre; Las Flores; La Floresta; San Salvador	Siape; Las Tres Avemarías; Villa del Este; El Castillo; Solaire; Parte de Paraíso; El Limoncito; Parte de Altos del Prado; La Castellana; Villa Carolina; Brinca y Pea

Norte-Centro Histórico

La Campiña; El Tabor; Miramar; Granadillo; Los Alpes; Nuevo Horizonte; El Porvenir; Altos del Prado; El Golf; Ciudad Jardín; El Country; Paraíso; Los Nogales; La Concepción; San Francisco; Santa Ana; América; Colombia; El Prado; Bellavista; Modelo	Montecristo; Abajo; La Cumbre; Nuevo Horizonte; Campo Alegre; Las Colinas; Los Jobos; Las Mercedes; Betania; Las Delicias; El Recreo; Boston; El Rosario; Centro; Barlovento; Villanueva; El Boliche

Metropolitana

La Sierra; La Victoria; Los Continentes; Kennedy; La Sierrita; El Santuario; Las Américas; Carrizal; Buenos Aires; Santo Domingo de Guzmán; Villa San Pedro; San Luis	Veinte de Julio; Santa María; Villa Sevilla; Las Granjas; Siete de Abril; Los Girasoles; Ciudadela Veinte de Julio; Parte de La Victoria; Santa Helena; San Roque; Realengo

Sur Occidente

La Pradera; Los Olivos; El Pueblo; Las Estrellas; Pastoral Social; Villa del Rosario; Las Terrazas; Mercedes Sur; Por Fin; La Paz; Mequejo; La Manga; 7 de agosto; Evaristo Sourdis; Lipaya; Olaya; El Silencio; La Libertad; Nueva Granada	Santo Domingo; Lucero; Los Pinos; Loma Fresca; San Isidro; Alfonso López; Los Andes; San Felipe; Carlos Meisel; Nueva Colombia; Las Malvinas; Los Rosales; Pumarejo; Villate; El Carmen; Buena Esperanza; La Sierra; La Ceiba; La Esmeralda; El Bosque	Chiquinquirá; Parte de El Recreo; San Pedro Alejandrino; La Gloria; Villa Flor; El Romance; California; San Pedro; Cordialidad; Las Torres; Ciudad Modesto; Paloquemao; Cevillar; Atlántico; Parte de Villa Blanca; El Valle

Sur Oriente

Chiquinquirá; San Roque; Rebolo; Atlántico; Montes; San José; Boyacá; Los Trupillos; La Luz; La Chinita; Las Nieves; Santa Helena; La Unión; Parte de La Victoria; El Campito; Las Palmas; La Magdalena; El Limón; El Tayrona	Universal; Las Dunas; San Nicolás; José Antonio Galán (Cacho Solo); Villa Blanca; El Milagro; Los Laureles; Bella Arena; Villa del Carmen; La Alboraya; Ciudad Cisneros; El Parque; Las Gaviotas; Parte de Buenos Aires; Simón Bolívar
