= List of heteronymous municipalities of Colombia =

List of Colombian municipalities whose name differs from that of their municipal seat

In Colombia, the name of a municipality generally matches the name of its municipal seat; however, there are around forty municipalities whose seat has a different name. More than half of these municipalities are located in the departments of Nariño and Chocó.

The following is a list of Colombian municipalities whose name differs from that of their seat.

Municipality	Municipal seat	Department
Alto Baudó	Pie de Pató	Chocó
Arboleda	Berruecos	Nariño
Ariguaní	El Difícil	Magdalena
Armero	Guayabal	Tolima
Bahía Solano	Ciudad Mutis	Chocó
Bajo Baudó	Pizarro	Chocó
Bojayá	Bellavista	Chocó
Calima	El Darién	Valle del Cauca
Chíquiza	San Pedro de Iguaque	Boyacá
Cuaspud	Carlosama	Nariño
El Atrato	Yuto	Chocó
El Cantón de San Pablo	Managrú	Chocó
Francisco Pizarro	Salahonda	Nariño
La Paz	Robles	Cesar
Lorica	Santa Cruz de Lorica	Córdoba
Los Andes	Sotomayor	Nariño
Mallama	Piedrancha	Nariño
Medio Atrato	Beté	Chocó
Medio Baudó	Puerto Meluk	Chocó
Medio San Juan	Andagoya	Chocó
Nuevo Belén de Bajirá	Belén de Bajirá	Chocó
Olaya Herrera	Bocas de Satinga	Nariño
Páez	Belalcázar	Cauca
Pasto	San Juan de Pasto	Nariño
Patía	El Bordo	Cauca
Providencia	Santa Isabel	San Andrés and Providencia
Puracé	Coconuco	Cauca
Río Iró	Santa Rita de Iró	Chocó
Río Quito	Paimadó	Chocó
Roberto Payán	San José de Telembí	Nariño
San Estanislao	Arenal	Bolívar
San Miguel	La Dorada	Putumayo
Santa Bárbara	Iscuandé	Nariño
Santacruz	Guachavés	Nariño
Sotará	Paispamba	Cauca
Tiquisio	Puerto Rico	Bolívar
Valle del Guamuez	La Hormiga	Putumayo
Zapayán	Punta de Piedras	Magdalena
Zona Bananera	Prado Sevilla	Magdalena

== See also ==
- Municipalities of Colombia
- List of municipalities in Colombia
- Hetero-
- Nominal
