= Baudo =

Baudo may refer to:

== Places ==
=== Geographical features ===
- Baudó Mountains, a mountain range on the Pacific coast of Colombia
- Baudó River, Colombia

=== Towns ===
- Alto Baudó, a municipality and town in Chocó, Colombia
- Bajo Baudó, a municipality and town in Chocó, Colombia
- Medio Baudó, a municipality and town in Chocó, Colombia

== People ==
- Antonio Baudo, Italian motorcycle designer
- Étienne Baudo (1903–2001), French oboist and teacher
- Lisa Ervin-Baudo (born 1977), American figure skater
- María del Carmen Hornillos Baudo (1962–2014), Spanish journalist and television presenter
- Pippo Baudo (1936–2025), Italian television presenter
- Serge Baudo (born 1927), French conductor

== Animal species ==
- Baudó oropendola, bird species
- Baudo guan, bird species

== Other uses ==
- Baudo language, spoken in Colombia

== See also ==
- Baudot (disambiguation)
- Boudot, a surname
