= San Isidro, Chocó =

San Isidro
- Populated center
- Location in Chocó and Colombia San Isidro (Colombia)
- Coordinates: 5°37′34.5″N 76°44′59.0″W
- Country: Colombia
- Department: Chocó
- Municipality: Río Quito Municipality
- Elevation: 148 ft (45 m)

Population (2005)
  - Total: 437
- Time zone: UTC-5 (Colombia Standard Time)

San Isidro is a populated center of Colombia in Río Quito Municipality, Chocó Department in Colombia.

== Climate ==
San Isidro has a very wet tropical rainforest climate (Af). .

Climate data for San Isidro
Month	Jan	Feb	Mar	Apr	May	Jun	Jul	Aug	Sep	Oct	Nov	Dec	Year
Mean daily maximum °C (°F)	30.0 (86.0)	30.5 (86.9)	30.7 (87.3)	31.1 (88.0)	31.3 (88.3)	31.1 (88.0)	31.1 (88.0)	31.2 (88.2)	31.0 (87.8)	30.6 (87.1)	30.2 (86.4)	30.0 (86.0)	30.7 (87.3)
Daily mean °C (°F)	26.0 (78.8)	26.3 (79.3)	26.6 (79.9)	26.6 (79.9)	26.6 (79.9)	26.5 (79.7)	26.5 (79.7)	26.4 (79.5)	26.3 (79.3)	26.0 (78.8)	25.9 (78.6)	25.9 (78.6)	26.3 (79.3)
Mean daily minimum °C (°F)	23.0 (73.4)	23.1 (73.6)	23.0 (73.4)	23.3 (73.9)	23.3 (73.9)	23.1 (73.6)	22.8 (73.0)	22.8 (73.0)	22.8 (73.0)	22.8 (73.0)	23.0 (73.4)	22.8 (73.0)	23.0 (73.4)
Average rainfall mm (inches)	516.0 (20.31)	469.6 (18.49)	493.6 (19.43)	601.8 (23.69)	625.6 (24.63)	648.3 (25.52)	708.8 (27.91)	723.9 (28.50)	542.5 (21.36)	507.4 (19.98)	561.7 (22.11)	501.8 (19.76)	6,901 (271.69)
Average rainy days	24	20	21	24	26	25	26	26	26	25	25	25	293
Average relative humidity (%)	90	88	88	88	88	88	88	88	88	88	89	90	88
