= Quito (disambiguation) =

Quito is the capital city of Ecuador and the seat of the Quito canton.

Quito may also refer to:

== Places ==
=== Ecuador ===
- Municipality of Quito, the governing body of the city of Quito, Ecuador and the canton that shares its name
- Puerto Quito, an urban parish in Pichincha Province, Ecuador
- Quito Canton, Pichincha Province, Ecuador

=== Elsewhere ===
- Quito, Mississippi, United States
- Quito Square, a public square in Bucharest, Romania
- Río Quito, a town and municipality in Choco Department, Colombia

== Other uses ==
- Emerita Quito (1929–2017), Filipino philosopher and academic
- Deportivo Quito, an Ecuadorian professional football club
- "Quito", a song by The Mountain Goats on the album We Shall All Be Healed
- Quito, the nickname of André Raposo, a Brazilian water polo player
