= Noanamá, Chocó =

Noanamá
- Populated center
- Location in Chocó and Colombia Noanamá (Colombia)
- Coordinates: 4°41′17.6″N 76°56′3.4″W
- Country: Colombia
- Department: Chocó
- Municipality: Medio San Juan Municipality
- Elevation: 130 ft (40 m)

Population (2018)
  - Total: 800 (approx.)
  - Ethnicities: Afro-Colombian
- Time zone: UTC-5 (Colombia Standard Time)

Noanamá is a populated center of Colombia in Medio San Juan Municipality, Chocó Department in Colombia.

== History ==
Noanamá's population was estimated at 300 in 1957.

The village was occupied by National Liberation Army militants in early 2018.

== Geography ==
Noanamá is situated in the Colombian rainforest, on the bank of a river. The main resources in Noanamá are gold, coca and an indigenous pancoger, as the local river is too polluted to fish or log timber. Sugarcane was grown in the area in the early 20th century.

== Climate ==
Noanamá has a very wet tropical rainforest climate (Af).

Climate data for Noanamá
Month	Jan	Feb	Mar	Apr	May	Jun	Jul	Aug	Sep	Oct	Nov	Dec	Year
Mean daily maximum °C (°F)	29.5 (85.1)	29.9 (85.8)	30.1 (86.2)	30.1 (86.2)	30.2 (86.4)	29.9 (85.8)	29.9 (85.8)	29.9 (85.8)	29.8 (85.6)	29.3 (84.7)	29.3 (84.7)	29.3 (84.7)	29.8 (85.6)
Daily mean °C (°F)	26.0 (78.8)	26.2 (79.2)	26.3 (79.3)	26.4 (79.5)	26.3 (79.3)	26.1 (79.0)	26.1 (79.0)	26.0 (78.8)	25.9 (78.6)	25.8 (78.4)	25.8 (78.4)	25.8 (78.4)	26.1 (78.9)
Mean daily minimum °C (°F)	22.4 (72.3)	22.5 (72.5)	22.6 (72.7)	22.7 (72.9)	22.7 (72.9)	22.5 (72.5)	22.4 (72.3)	22.4 (72.3)	22.3 (72.1)	22.3 (72.1)	22.4 (72.3)	22.5 (72.5)	22.5 (72.5)
Average rainfall mm (inches)	453.9 (17.87)	367.4 (14.46)	415.3 (16.35)	498.7 (19.63)	535.5 (21.08)	511.6 (20.14)	592.0 (23.31)	668.1 (26.30)	600.5 (23.64)	568.5 (22.38)	528.5 (20.81)	514.2 (20.24)	6,254.2 (246.21)
Average rainy days	25	21	23	25	26	26	28	28	26	27	26	25	306
Average relative humidity (%)	91	91	91	91	90	91	91	91	91	91	92	92	91
Mean monthly sunshine hours	71.3	76.2	74.4	81.0	89.9	84.0	105.4	99.2	75.0	74.4	75.0	71.3	977.1
Mean daily sunshine hours	2.3	2.7	2.4	2.7	2.9	2.8	3.4	3.2	2.5	2.4	2.5	2.3	2.7
