= Buchadó =

- Populated center
- Location within Colombia
- Coordinates: 6°25′15″N 76°46′52″W
- Country: Colombia
- Department: Antioquia Department
- Subregion: Urabá
- Municipality: Vigía del Fuerte
- Time zone: UTC-5 (Colombia Standard Time)

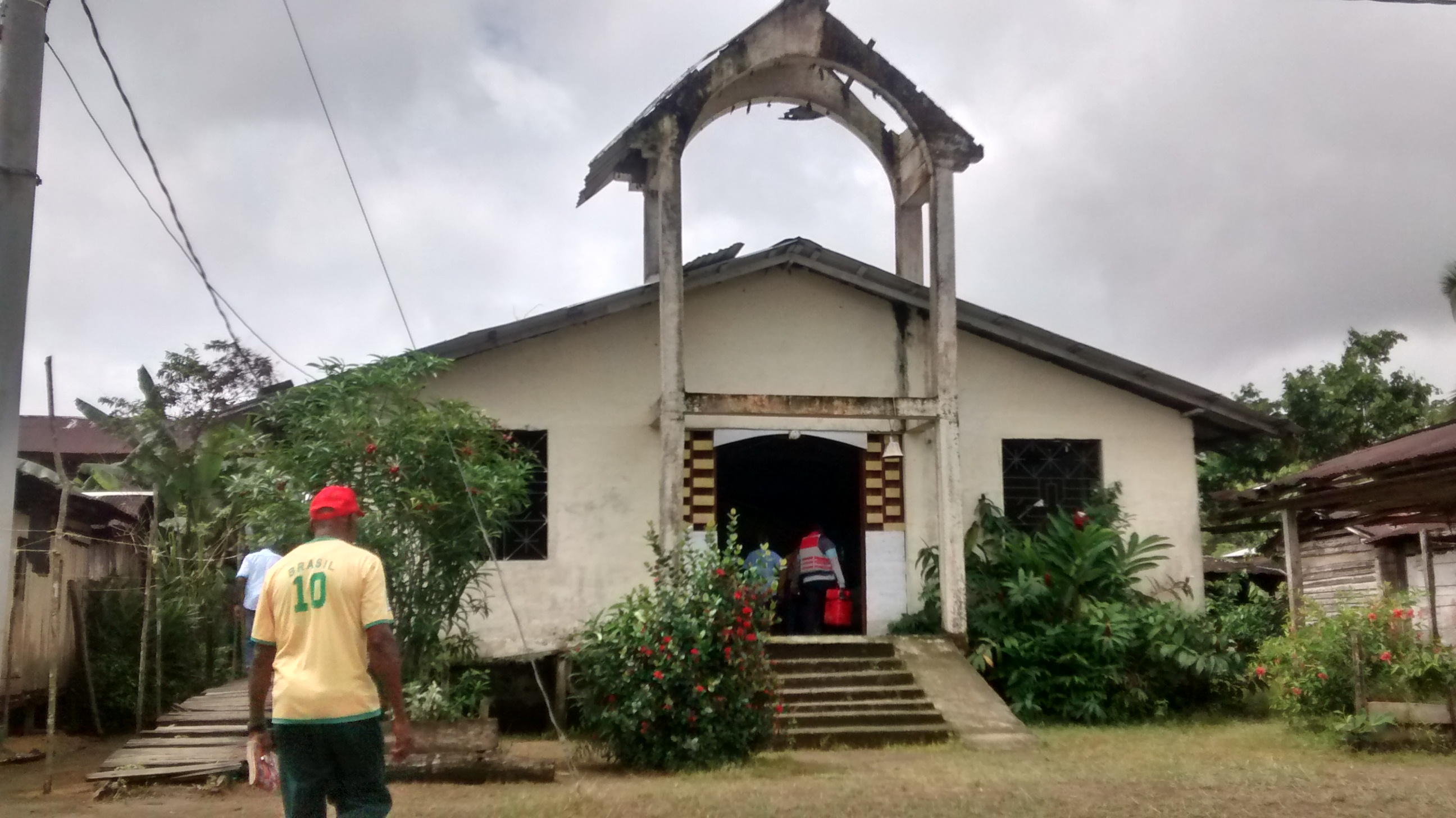
Church Buchado

Buchadó is a populated center of Colombia in the municipality of Vigía del Fuerte in the Colombian department of Antioquia. The village is situated on the east bank of the Atrato river, which marks the border with the Chocó department on the west bank.

== Climate ==
Buchadó has a very wet tropical rainforest climate (Af).

Climate data for Buchadó
Month	Jan	Feb	Mar	Apr	May	Jun	Jul	Aug	Sep	Oct	Nov	Dec	Year
Mean daily maximum °C (°F)	30.4 (86.7)	30.6 (87.1)	30.9 (87.6)	30.7 (87.3)	29.8 (85.6)	29.9 (85.8)	30.0 (86.0)	30.0 (86.0)	29.3 (84.7)	29.1 (84.4)	29.3 (84.7)	29.9 (85.8)	30.0 (86.0)
Daily mean °C (°F)	26.1 (79.0)	26.4 (79.5)	26.7 (80.1)	26.6 (79.9)	26.1 (79.0)	26.1 (79.0)	26.1 (79.0)	26.2 (79.2)	25.8 (78.4)	25.6 (78.1)	25.6 (78.1)	26.2 (79.2)	26.1 (79.0)
Mean daily minimum °C (°F)	22.9 (73.2)	23.2 (73.8)	23.6 (74.5)	23.6 (74.5)	23.5 (74.3)	23.4 (74.1)	23.3 (73.9)	23.4 (74.1)	23.4 (74.1)	23.1 (73.6)	22.9 (73.2)	23.5 (74.3)	23.3 (74.0)
Average rainfall mm (inches)	351 (13.8)	324 (12.8)	316 (12.4)	640 (25.2)	605 (23.8)	537 (21.1)	654 (25.7)	551 (21.7)	429 (16.9)	497 (19.6)	471 (18.5)	447 (17.6)	5,822 (229.1)
