= Pie de Pepe =

Village in Chocó, Colombia

- Populated center
- Location in Chocó and Colombia Pie de Pepe (Colombia)
- Coordinates: 5°7′8.238″N 76°49′27.7464″W
- Country: Colombia
- Department: Chocó
- Municipality: Medio Baudó Municipality
- Elevation: 187 ft (57 m)

Population (2005)
  - Total: 1,468
- Time zone: UTC-5 (Colombia Standard Time)

Pie de Pepe is a populated center of Colombia in Medio Baudó Municipality, Chocó Department in Colombia.

== Climate ==
Pie de Pepe has a very wet tropical rainforest climate (Af).

Climate data for Pie de Pepe
Month	Jan	Feb	Mar	Apr	May	Jun	Jul	Aug	Sep	Oct	Nov	Dec	Year
Mean daily maximum °C (°F)	30.6 (87.1)	30.4 (86.7)	31.0 (87.8)	30.8 (87.4)	31.1 (88.0)	30.7 (87.3)	31.0 (87.8)	30.8 (87.4)	30.6 (87.1)	30.2 (86.4)	29.9 (85.8)	30.1 (86.2)	30.6 (87.1)
Daily mean °C (°F)	26.5 (79.7)	26.3 (79.3)	26.7 (80.1)	26.6 (79.9)	26.8 (80.2)	26.4 (79.5)	26.7 (80.1)	26.5 (79.7)	26.4 (79.5)	26.1 (79.0)	26.0 (78.8)	26.2 (79.2)	26.4 (79.6)
Mean daily minimum °C (°F)	22.4 (72.3)	22.2 (72.0)	22.5 (72.5)	22.5 (72.5)	22.5 (72.5)	22.2 (72.0)	22.4 (72.3)	22.2 (72.0)	22.2 (72.0)	22.1 (71.8)	22.1 (71.8)	22.3 (72.1)	22.3 (72.1)
Average rainfall mm (inches)	561.4 (22.10)	476.0 (18.74)	491.4 (19.35)	468.6 (18.45)	506.3 (19.93)	518.3 (20.41)	626.0 (24.65)	582.4 (22.93)	547.3 (21.55)	555.2 (21.86)	549.1 (21.62)	545.1 (21.46)	6,427.1 (253.05)
Average rainy days	17	14	16	16	17	17	18	18	16	17	17	17	200
Source 1:
Source 2:
