= Bebedó, Chocó =

Village in Chocó, Colombia

Bebedó
- Populated center
- Location in Chocó and Colombia Bebedó (Colombia)
- Coordinates: 4°55′58.6″N 76°49′40.2″W
- Country: Colombia
- Department: Chocó
- Municipality: Medio San Juan Municipality
- Elevation: 160 ft (50 m)

Population (2005)
  - Total: 1,454
- Time zone: UTC-5 (Colombia Standard Time)

Bebedó is a populated center of Colombia in Medio San Juan Municipality, Chocó Department in Colombia.

== Climate ==
Bebedó has an extremely wet tropical rainforest climate (Af).

Climate data for Bebedó
Month	Jan	Feb	Mar	Apr	May	Jun	Jul	Aug	Sep	Oct	Nov	Dec	Year
Mean daily maximum °C (°F)	29.9 (85.8)	29.8 (85.6)	30.3 (86.5)	30.2 (86.4)	30.3 (86.5)	30.1 (86.2)	30.3 (86.5)	30.1 (86.2)	30.0 (86.0)	29.5 (85.1)	29.2 (84.6)	29.4 (84.9)	29.9 (85.9)
Daily mean °C (°F)	26.0 (78.8)	25.9 (78.6)	26.3 (79.3)	26.2 (79.2)	26.2 (79.2)	26.0 (78.8)	26.1 (79.0)	26.0 (78.8)	26.0 (78.8)	25.6 (78.1)	25.5 (77.9)	25.6 (78.1)	26.0 (78.7)
Mean daily minimum °C (°F)	22.1 (71.8)	22.0 (71.6)	22.3 (72.1)	22.3 (72.1)	22.2 (72.0)	22.0 (71.6)	22.0 (71.6)	22.0 (71.6)	22.0 (71.6)	21.8 (71.2)	21.9 (71.4)	21.9 (71.4)	22.0 (71.7)
Average rainfall mm (inches)	673.5 (26.52)	556.8 (21.92)	604.2 (23.79)	675.4 (26.59)	725.8 (28.57)	710.9 (27.99)	809.2 (31.86)	822.6 (32.39)	757.4 (29.82)	737.9 (29.05)	691.3 (27.22)	715.5 (28.17)	8,480.5 (333.89)
Average rainy days	19	16	15	17	19	20	20	21	19	20	19	20	225
