= Vigía del Fuerte Airport =

Airport in Colombia

- IATA: none; ICAO: SKVF; LID: SK-025

Summary
- Airport type: Public
- Serves: Vigía del Fuerte
- Elevation AMSL: 72 ft / 22 m
- Coordinates: 6°34′05″N 76°53′15″W

Map

Runways
Direction	Length		Surface
Direction	m	ft	Surface
14/32	1,250	4,101	Grass
- Sources: GCM Google Maps

Vigía del Fuerte Airport (ICAO: SKVF) is an airstrip serving the river town of Vigía del Fuerte and the surrounding area, in the Antioquia Department of Colombia. The runway is on the eastern bank of the Atrato River, 2 kilometres (1.2 mi) upstream, south of the town. The airstrip used to be located inside the town, and made of grass. As the town expanded the airstrip was relocated, the old airstrip was refurbished to be a park, retaining its original shape.

The river is locally the boundary between the Antioquia and Chocó Departments of Colombia.

In 2013, presumed FARC rebels attacked the new airstrip and set fire to an aircraft.

== See also ==
- Transport in Colombia
- List of airports in Colombia
