= Dorobanți =

Neighborhood in Bucharest, Romania

Coordinates: 44.459178°N 26.094997°E

Dorobanți on the map of Bucharest

Dorobanți is a neighborhood in Sector 1, Bucharest. The neighborhood is dominated by red brick buildings and glass buildings. Main intersections/squares are Perla, Dorobanți Square, Alexandru Lahovari Square, Charles de Gaulle Square, and Quito Square. Main streets are Calea Dorobanților, Iancu de Hunedoara Avenue, Lascăr Catargiu Boulevard, and a small part of Ștefan cel Mare Boulevard. The district features many embassy buildings, and local cafés are regarded as meeting places of Bucharest's nouveau riche.

== History ==
Calea Dorobanți is one of the oldest streets with heavy traffic in Bucharest. The area around the street was designed and built as an exclusive district. The current name was given to the street in 1878, after the Romanian War of Independence, as a tribute to the Romanian infantry troops (Dorobanți in Romanian) who fought at Pleven, Vidin and Grivitsa. The street runs from Lahovari Square to the south to Dorobanți Square to the north. The Ion Luca Caragiale National College is located at the northern end of Calea Dorobanți.

In 1947, the Zambaccian Museum was founded in the neighbourhood.

== Borders ==
Dorobanți neighborhood is delimited in the south by Piața Romană, in the south-east by Mihai Eminescu Street, in the east by Polonă Street, Floreasca Avenue, and the Floreasca district, in the north-east by Primăverii neighborhood, in the north by Herăstrău neighborhood, in the west by Aviatorilor Avenue and Victory Square, and in the south-west by Lascăr Catargiu Avenue.

== Transport ==
- There are four metro stations, one located in each corner of the neighborhood: Aviatorilor in the north; Victoriei on the west; Romană in the south; and Ștefan cel Mare in the east.
- Bucharest Transit Corporation (RATB) lines 331, 301, 131, 282, 182, 330, 684, 335, and 783 and a tram-line serve this district.

== Gallery ==
Visarion Orthodox Church

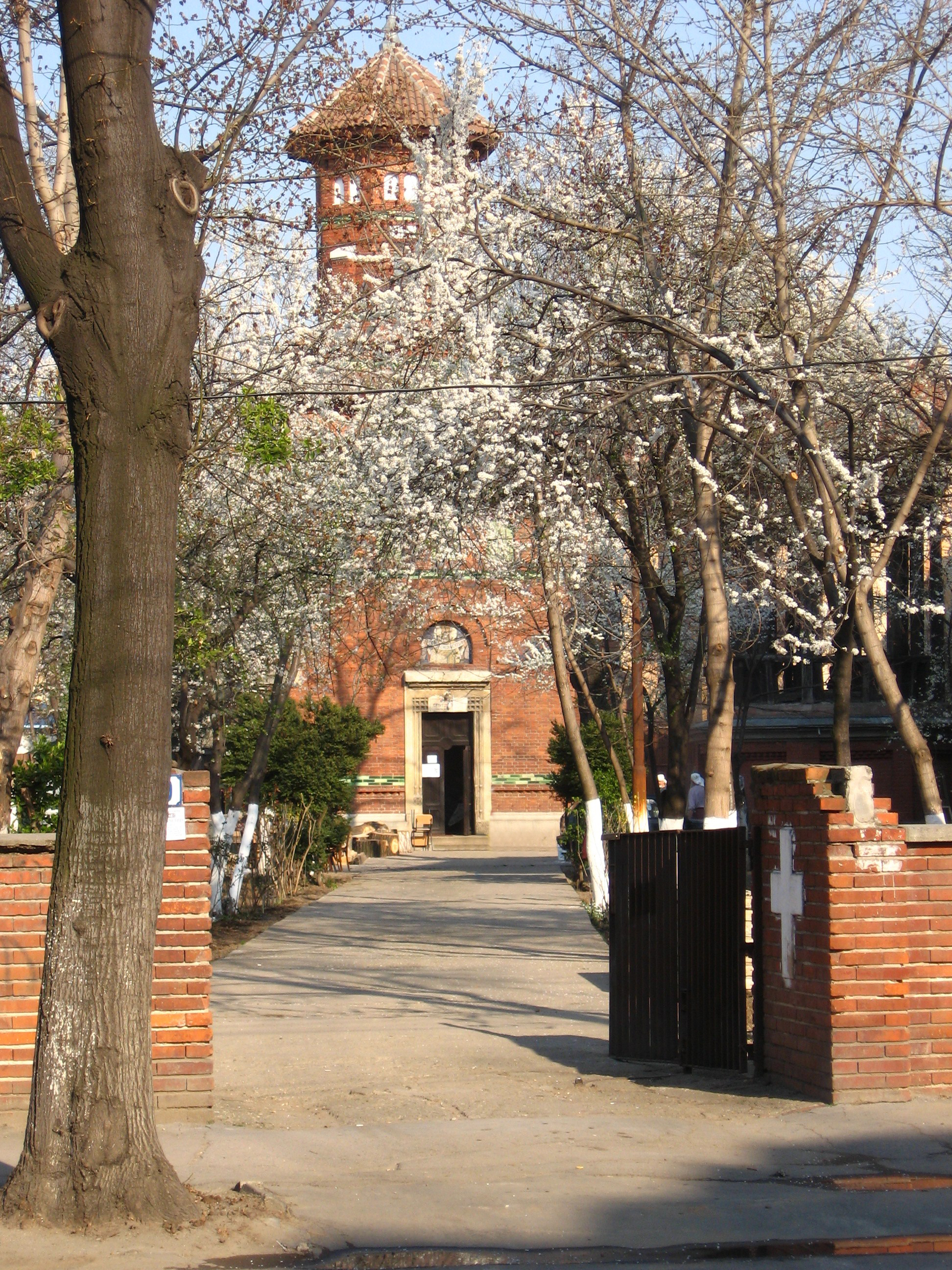
Greek-Catholic Cathedral of Saint Basil the Great in Strada Polonă

Broșteanu Orthodox Church

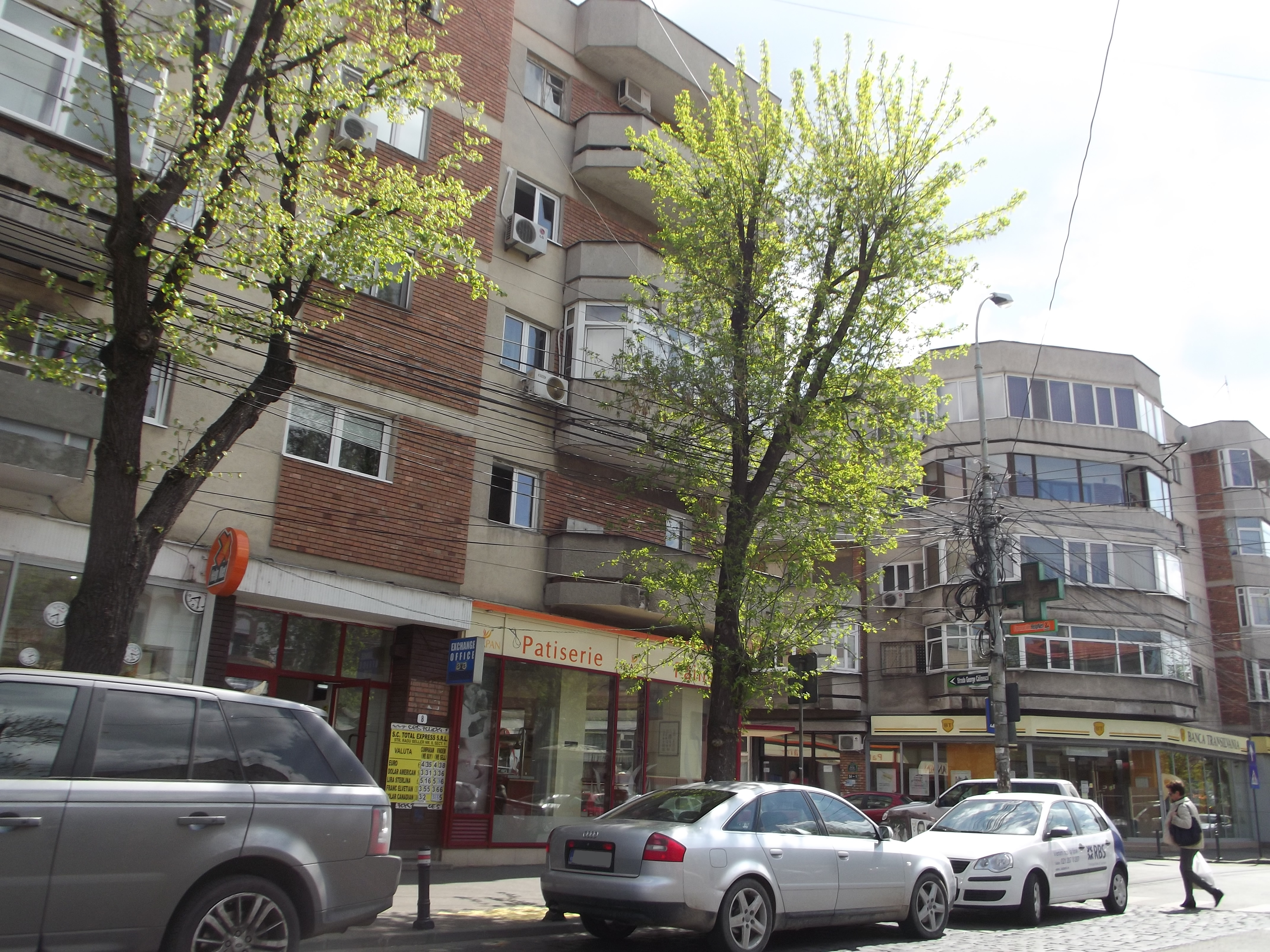
Apartment blocks in Dorobanți

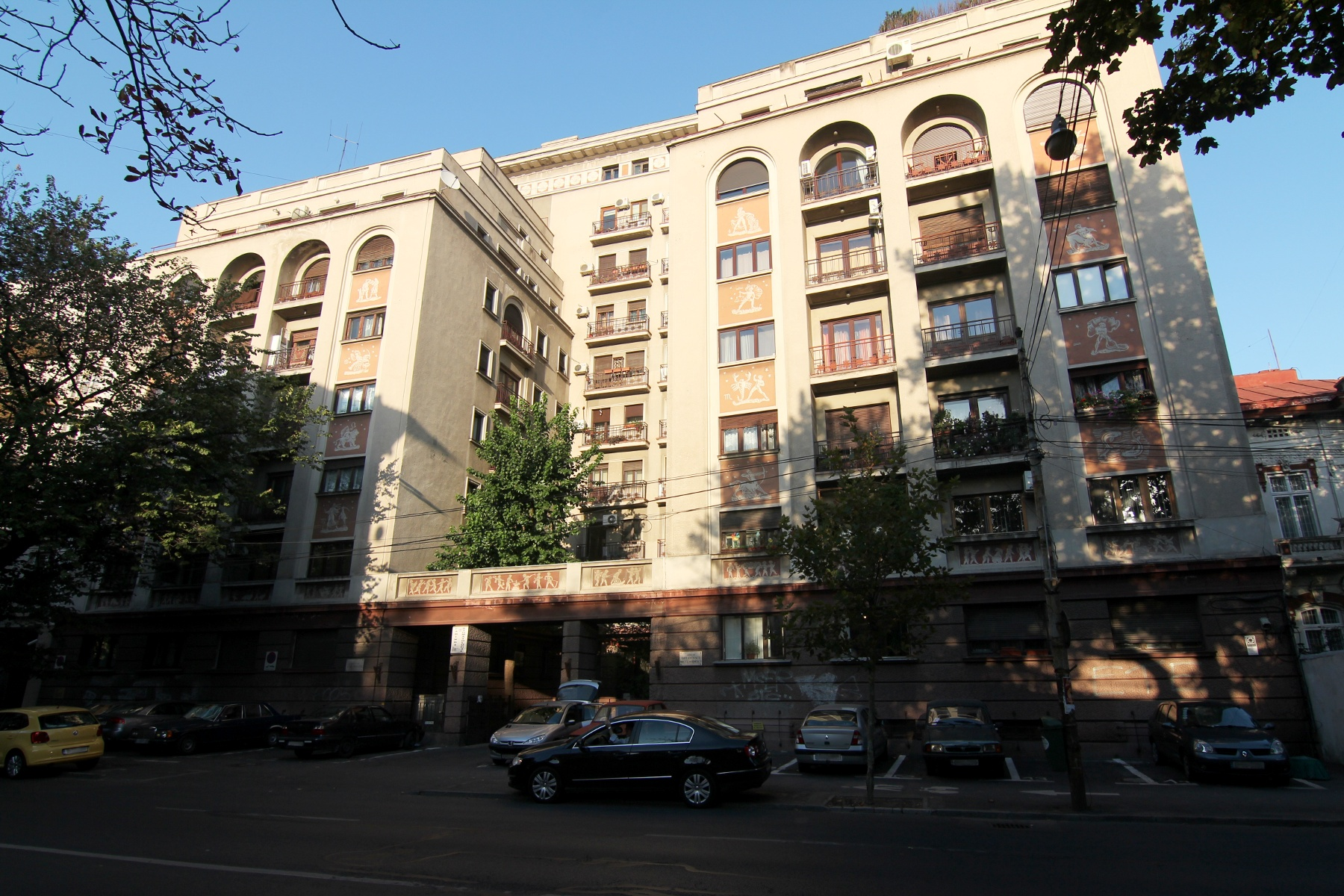
Zodiac building, on Calea Dorobanților

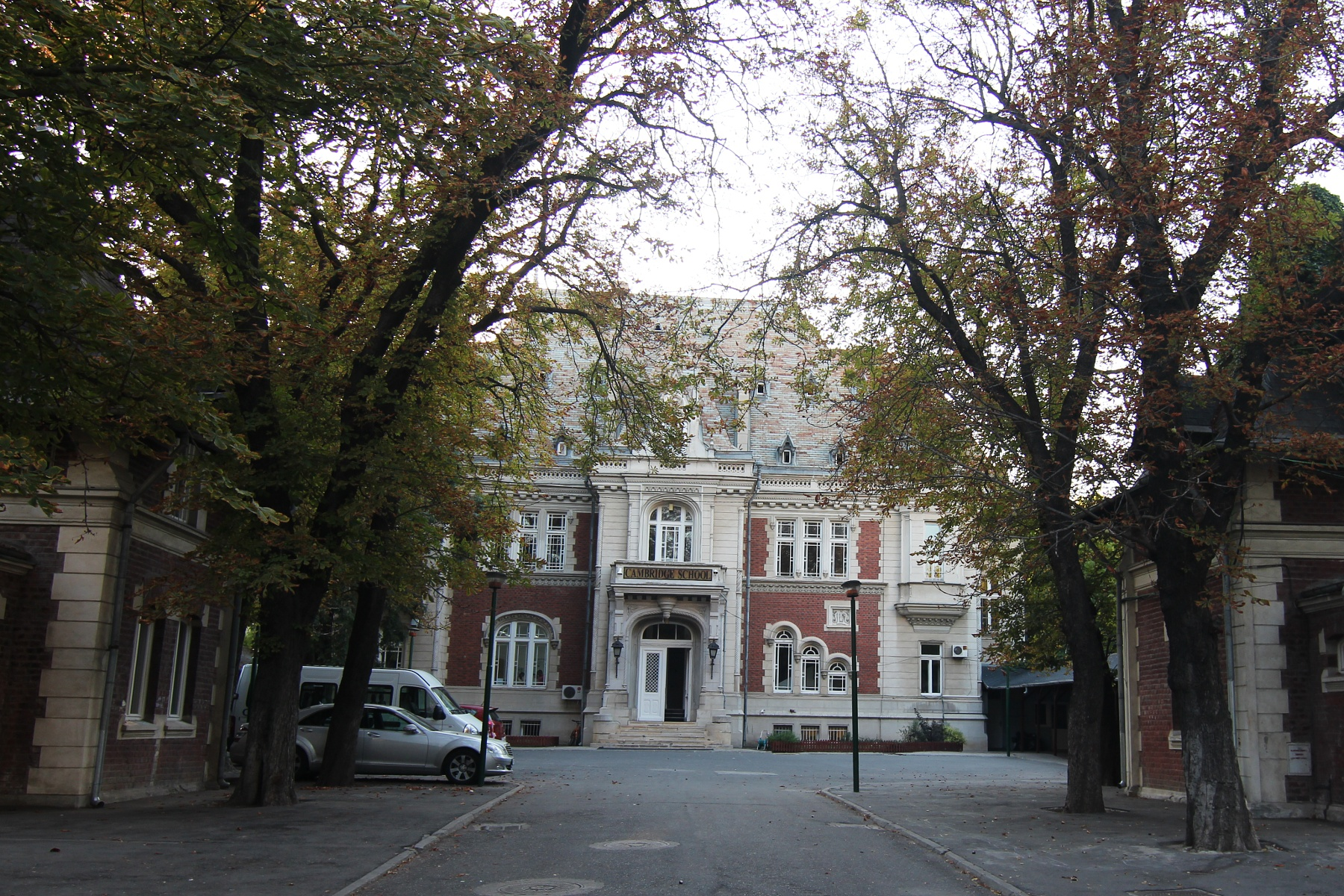
Maria Lahovary house, on Calea Dorobanților

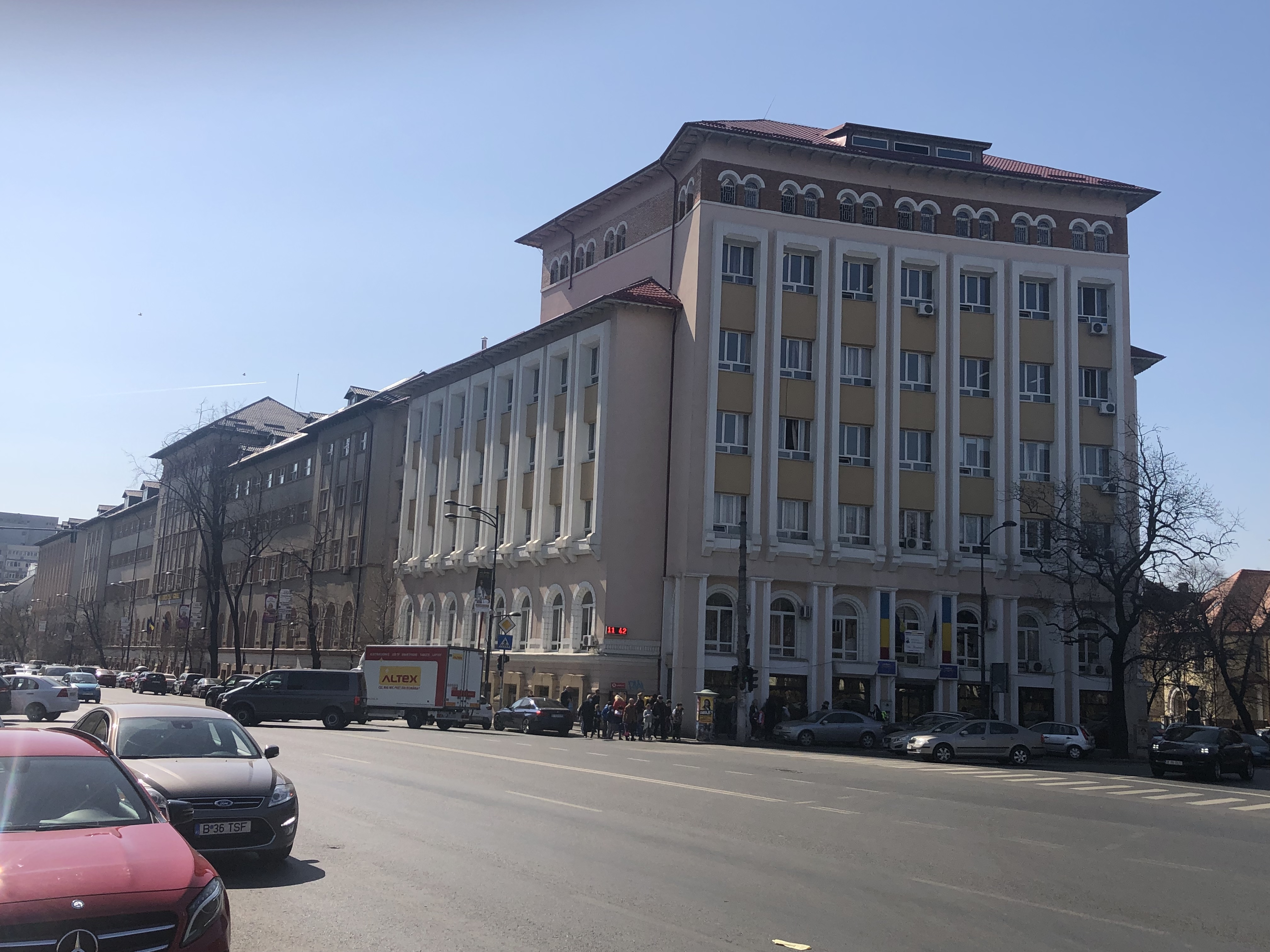
Ion Luca Caragiale National College, viewed from Dorobanți Square
