= Domingo Chalá =

Colombian singer and gravedigger

- Born: Domingo Chalá Valencia; 1945 or 1946 (age 79–80)
- Occupations: gravedigger, singer, songwriter
- Musical career
- Genres: vallenato

Domingo Chalá Valencia is a Colombian gravedigger and vallenato singer. Chalá was the gravedigger of Bellavista during the Bojayá massacre; in the aftermath he was interviewed several times by Colombian and international media. Radio Nacional de Colombia wrote that Chalá "is synonymous with art and resilience, his vallenatos reverberate nationally and internationally, bringing a message of peace and reconciliation to the whole of Colombian society."

== Biography ==
Chalá was born in 1945 or 1946. He was the gravedigger of Bellavista, a town in Bojayá, Colombia, for much of his life.

On 2 May 2002, a large number of FARC fighters arrived in Bellavista, searching for a group of paramilitaries. A gas cylinder bomb fired by the FARC hit a church where people were sheltering, killing 98, including 48 children. Chalá removed the dead from the church; many had to be buried without having been identified. The event became known as the Bojayá massacre, and in the aftermath Chalá was interviewed several times by both the Colombian and international media.

Chalá became interested in vallenato following his military service in 1964. He began writing songs following the Bojayá massacre, with lyrics addressing the experience as well as the decades of war that preceded it. Chalá's debut album Vallenatos del Medio Atrato was released in November 2024. Diego Londoño of El Colombiano called the album "a sonorous vindication of a born singer...He sings to the war and to oblivion." Chalá recorded the album with the help of Andrés Felipe Restrepo, an artist and photographer, and distributed the album on USB sticks sold through his Instagram. The album artwork was created by students at the Pontifical Bolivarian University.

== Albums ==
- Vallenatos del Medio Atrato (2024)
