= Atrato (disambiguation) =

Atrato is the name of a town and municipality in Colombia. After it are named:

- The Atrato River, which flows from the Cordillera Occidental to the Gulf of Urabá
- RMS Atrato (1853), a Royal Mail Steam Packet Company (RMSP) paddle steamer built in 1853
- RMS Atrato (1888), an RMSP screw steamer built in 1888 that became the armed merchant cruiser HMS Viknor in 1914
