= Paimadó =

- Location in Chocó and Colombia Paimadó (Colombia)
- Coordinates: 5°28′53.8″N 76°44′27.1″W
- Country: Colombia
- Department: Chocó
- Municipality: Río Quito Municipality
- Elevation: 115 ft (35 m)

Population (2005)
  - Total: 2,124
- Time zone: UTC-5 (Colombia Standard Time)

Paimadó is the capital of Río Quito Municipality, Chocó Department in Colombia.

== Climate ==
Paimadó has a very wet tropical rainforest climate (Af).

Climate data for Paimadó
Month	Jan	Feb	Mar	Apr	May	Jun	Jul	Aug	Sep	Oct	Nov	Dec	Year
Mean daily maximum °C (°F)	30.5 (86.9)	30.4 (86.7)	31.0 (87.8)	30.8 (87.4)	31.0 (87.8)	30.7 (87.3)	31.0 (87.8)	30.8 (87.4)	30.6 (87.1)	30.2 (86.4)	29.8 (85.6)	30.1 (86.2)	30.6 (87.0)
Daily mean °C (°F)	26.5 (79.7)	26.4 (79.5)	26.9 (80.4)	26.8 (80.2)	26.9 (80.4)	26.6 (79.9)	26.8 (80.2)	26.7 (80.1)	26.5 (79.7)	26.3 (79.3)	26.1 (79.0)	26.3 (79.3)	26.6 (79.8)
Mean daily minimum °C (°F)	22.6 (72.7)	22.5 (72.5)	22.8 (73.0)	22.8 (73.0)	22.8 (73.0)	22.5 (72.5)	22.6 (72.7)	22.6 (72.7)	22.4 (72.3)	22.4 (72.3)	22.4 (72.3)	22.5 (72.5)	22.6 (72.6)
Average rainfall mm (inches)	421.3 (16.59)	425.5 (16.75)	392.9 (15.47)	451.6 (17.78)	480.3 (18.91)	443.2 (17.45)	573.4 (22.57)	485.6 (19.12)	451.3 (17.77)	421.4 (16.59)	453.9 (17.87)	418.8 (16.49)	5,419.2 (213.36)
Average rainy days	15	14	15	16	18	16	18	18	17	15	17	15	194
Source 1:
Source 2:
