= Bagadó =

Coordinates: 5°25′N 76°25′W

- Municipality and town
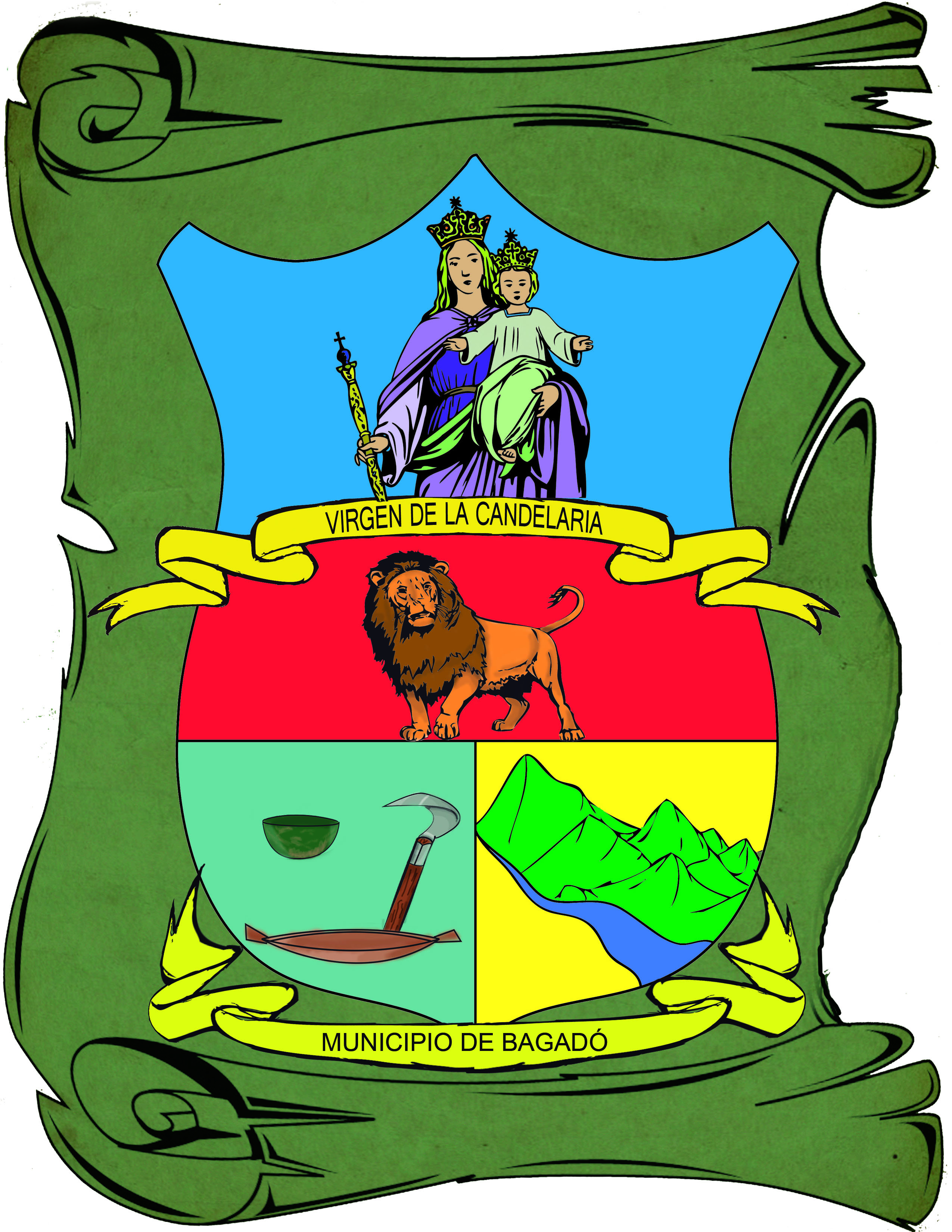
- Flag Coat of arms

- Location of the municipality and town of Bagadó in the Caquetá Department of Colombia.
- Country: Colombia
- Department: Chocó Department
- Founded: 1578

Government
  - Mayor: Marinella Palomeque Serna

Area
  - Municipality and town: 777 km^{2} (300 sq mi)
- Elevation: 200 m (660 ft)

Population (2015)
  - Municipality and town: 13,174
  - Density: 16.96/km^{2} (43.9/sq mi)
  - Urban: 2,540
- Time zone: UTC-5 (Colombia Standard Time)

Bagadó (Spanish pronunciation: [baɣaˈðo]) is a municipality and town in the Chocó Department, Colombia. It is the site of the Tahami Indigenous reservation.

== Climate ==
Bagadó has an extremely wet tropical rainforest climate (Af).

Climate data for Bagadó
Month	Jan	Feb	Mar	Apr	May	Jun	Jul	Aug	Sep	Oct	Nov	Dec	Year
Mean daily maximum °C (°F)	30.1 (86.2)	30.2 (86.4)	30.6 (87.1)	30.3 (86.5)	30.2 (86.4)	30.0 (86.0)	30.3 (86.5)	30.3 (86.5)	30.2 (86.4)	29.7 (85.5)	29.5 (85.1)	29.7 (85.5)	30.1 (86.2)
Daily mean °C (°F)	26.2 (79.2)	26.3 (79.3)	26.6 (79.9)	26.5 (79.7)	26.4 (79.5)	26.2 (79.2)	26.3 (79.3)	26.3 (79.3)	26.3 (79.3)	25.9 (78.6)	25.8 (78.4)	26.0 (78.8)	26.2 (79.2)
Mean daily minimum °C (°F)	22.4 (72.3)	22.4 (72.3)	22.7 (72.9)	22.8 (73.0)	22.7 (72.9)	22.4 (72.3)	22.4 (72.3)	22.4 (72.3)	22.5 (72.5)	22.2 (72.0)	22.2 (72.0)	22.3 (72.1)	22.5 (72.4)
Average rainfall mm (inches)	553 (21.8)	461 (18.1)	507 (20.0)	657 (25.9)	721 (28.4)	684 (26.9)	636 (25.0)	766 (30.2)	732 (28.8)	794 (31.3)	714 (28.1)	641 (25.2)	7,866 (309.7)
