= Litoral del San Juan =

Coordinates: 4.25861°N 77.3675°W

- Municipality and town
- Flag Coat of arms

- Location of the municipality and town of Litoral del Sanjuán in the Chocó Department of Colombia.
- Country: Colombia
- Department: Chocó Department

Area
  - Total: 3,755 km^{2} (1,450 sq mi)

Population (Census 2018)
  - Total: 11,579
  - Density: 3.084/km^{2} (7.987/sq mi)
- Time zone: UTC-5 (Colombia Standard Time)

Litoral del San Juan is a municipality and town in the Chocó Department, Colombia.

== Climate ==
Litoral del San Juan has an extremely wet tropical rainforest climate (Af) with very heavy to extremely heavy rainfall year-round. The following climate data is for Santa Genoveva de Docordó, the capital of the municipality.

Climate data for Docordó
Month	Jan	Feb	Mar	Apr	May	Jun	Jul	Aug	Sep	Oct	Nov	Dec	Year
Mean daily maximum °C (°F)	29.3 (84.7)	29.6 (85.3)	29.9 (85.8)	30.0 (86.0)	29.9 (85.8)	29.6 (85.3)	29.4 (84.9)	29.0 (84.2)	28.6 (83.5)	28.1 (82.6)	28.3 (82.9)	28.6 (83.5)	29.2 (84.5)
Daily mean °C (°F)	25.8 (78.4)	25.9 (78.6)	26.2 (79.2)	26.3 (79.3)	26.3 (79.3)	26.0 (78.8)	25.9 (78.6)	25.7 (78.3)	25.4 (77.7)	25.1 (77.2)	25.2 (77.4)	25.5 (77.9)	25.8 (78.4)
Mean daily minimum °C (°F)	22.3 (72.1)	22.3 (72.1)	22.6 (72.7)	22.6 (72.7)	22.7 (72.9)	22.4 (72.3)	22.4 (72.3)	22.5 (72.5)	22.3 (72.1)	22.2 (72.0)	22.2 (72.0)	22.4 (72.3)	22.4 (72.3)
Average rainfall mm (inches)	374 (14.7)	311 (12.2)	365 (14.4)	476 (18.7)	630 (24.8)	640 (25.2)	660 (26.0)	733 (28.9)	794 (31.3)	802 (31.6)	767 (30.2)	601 (23.7)	7,153 (281.7)
Source: Climate-Data.org
