= Boudot =

Boudot is a surname. Notable people with the surname include:

- Léon Boudot (1851–1930), French painter
- Martin Boudot (born 1985), French investigative journalist and documentary filmmaker
- Paul Boudot (1571–1635), bishop of Saint-Omer and bishop of Arras
- Pierre-Charles Boudot (born 1992), French flat racing jockey

== See also ==
- Baudo (disambiguation)
