= Unión Panamericana =

Coordinates: 5°16′53″N 76°37′48″W

- Municipality and town
- Flag

- Location of the municipality and town of Unión Panamericana in the Chocó Department of Colombia.
- Country: Colombia
- Department: Chocó Department

Area
  - Total: 1,600 km^{2} (620 sq mi)

Population (Census 2018)
  - Total: 6,590
  - Density: 4.1/km^{2} (11/sq mi)
- Time zone: UTC-5 (Colombia Standard Time)

Unión Panamericana is a municipality and town in the Chocó Department, Colombia.
