= Cértegui =

Coordinates: 5°24′N 76°36′W

- Municipality and town
- Flag

- Location of the municipality and town of Cértegui in the Chocó Department of Colombia.
- Country: Colombia
- Department: Chocó Department

Area
  - Total: 342 km^{2} (132 sq mi)
- Elevation: 43 m (141 ft)

Population (Census 2018)
  - Total: 4,683
  - Density: 13.7/km^{2} (35.5/sq mi)
- Time zone: UTC-5 (Colombia Standard Time)

Cértegui (Spanish pronunciation: [ˈseɾteɣi]) is a municipality and town in the Chocó Department, Colombia.

== Climate ==
Cértegui has an extremely wet tropical rainforest climate (Af).

Climate data for Cértegui town
Month	Jan	Feb	Mar	Apr	May	Jun	Jul	Aug	Sep	Oct	Nov	Dec	Year
Mean daily maximum °C (°F)	30.5 (86.9)	30.4 (86.7)	30.9 (87.6)	30.6 (87.1)	30.7 (87.3)	30.5 (86.9)	30.8 (87.4)	30.7 (87.3)	30.5 (86.9)	30.1 (86.2)	29.9 (85.8)	30.0 (86.0)	30.5 (86.8)
Daily mean °C (°F)	26.9 (80.4)	26.8 (80.2)	27.2 (81.0)	27.0 (80.6)	27.1 (80.8)	26.9 (80.4)	27.1 (80.8)	27.0 (80.6)	26.9 (80.4)	26.5 (79.7)	26.5 (79.7)	26.5 (79.7)	26.9 (80.4)
Mean daily minimum °C (°F)	23.3 (73.9)	23.2 (73.8)	23.5 (74.3)	23.5 (74.3)	23.5 (74.3)	23.3 (73.9)	23.4 (74.1)	23.3 (73.9)	23.3 (73.9)	23.0 (73.4)	23.1 (73.6)	23.1 (73.6)	23.3 (73.9)
Average rainfall mm (inches)	621.6 (24.47)	589.8 (23.22)	600.6 (23.65)	733.9 (28.89)	688.8 (27.12)	717.3 (28.24)	750.1 (29.53)	826.8 (32.55)	738.0 (29.06)	726.5 (28.60)	662.6 (26.09)	624.1 (24.57)	8,280.1 (325.99)
Average rainy days	20	17	18	20	21	21	22	23	22	21	20	20	245
