= Vigía del Fuerte =

- Municipality and town
- Flag
- Motto: "Ethnia, Pluralidad, Libertad"
- Location of the municipality and town in the Antioquia Department of Colombia

- Location in Colombia
- Coordinates: 6°35′20″N 76°53′45″W
- Country: Colombia
- Department: Antioquia Department
- Subregion: Urabá

Area
  - Municipality and town: 1,801 km^{2} (695 sq mi)
  - Urban: 2 km^{2} (0.77 sq mi)
- Elevation: 12 m (39 ft)

Population (2020)
  - Municipality and town: 5,624
  - Urban: 2,106
- Projections based on 2005 estimations by DANE - Government of Colombia
- Demonym: Vigideño/ Vigideña
- Time zone: UTC-5 (Colombia Standard Time)

Vigía del Fuerte is a town and municipality in the Colombian department of Antioquia. It is part of the Urabá Antioquia sub-region.

The town is on the eastern bank of the Atrato River, which locally forms the border between the Antioquia and Chocó Departments of Colombia. Vigía del Fuerte neighbours Bellavista, and played a significant role, suffering losses during, and receiving those fleeing the Bojayá massacre in 2002.

== Town ==
Most of the buildings and roads in the town are elevated on poles because of the wet soil and frequent flooding. The town is connected only by river to neighbouring towns, and to Quibdó, the capital of the Chocó Department.

The town is served by the Vigía del Fuerte Airstrip, receiving a more or less daily charter flight in the form of a small propeller plane, connecting it to Medellin.

The town hosts two colleges. One generic college serving the town and nearby villages and communities. And the Institución Educativa Embera Atrato Medio, a semi-residential college aimed exclusively at the Embera people living in the region. The latter is run primarily by the Misioneras de la Madre Laura, residing in the town.

== Armed conflict ==
On 25 March 2000, around 300 members of the 57th and 34th fronts of the Northwestern Bloc of the FARC-EP took over the town from AUC control. During the surprise attack they simultaneously attacked the house that the AUC was using as a base and the police station in the centre of the town. The guerrilleros ended up launching a cilindro bomba, a makeshift, heavy explosive, into the police station. The resulting explosion took out the concrete police station and damaged the neighbouring church beyond repair. Afterwards, they went into the police station with drawn machetes, none of the 22 policemen survived. Besides the policemen around 9 civilians were killed, bystanders or expected collaborators of the AUC. Among the dead was the major of the town, whose body they burned.

Two men were killed on 1 May 2002 the day preceding the Bojayá Massacre. Three men were confirmed to have been killed on 4 May by members of the FARC upon the accusation of having stolen gasoline for the paramilitaries. All of the 5 aforementioned men are buried in the mausoleum with the victims of the 2 May massacre in Bojayá.

On October 11, 2013, presumed FARC rebels attacked the municipality's airport, destroying an aircraft in the process.

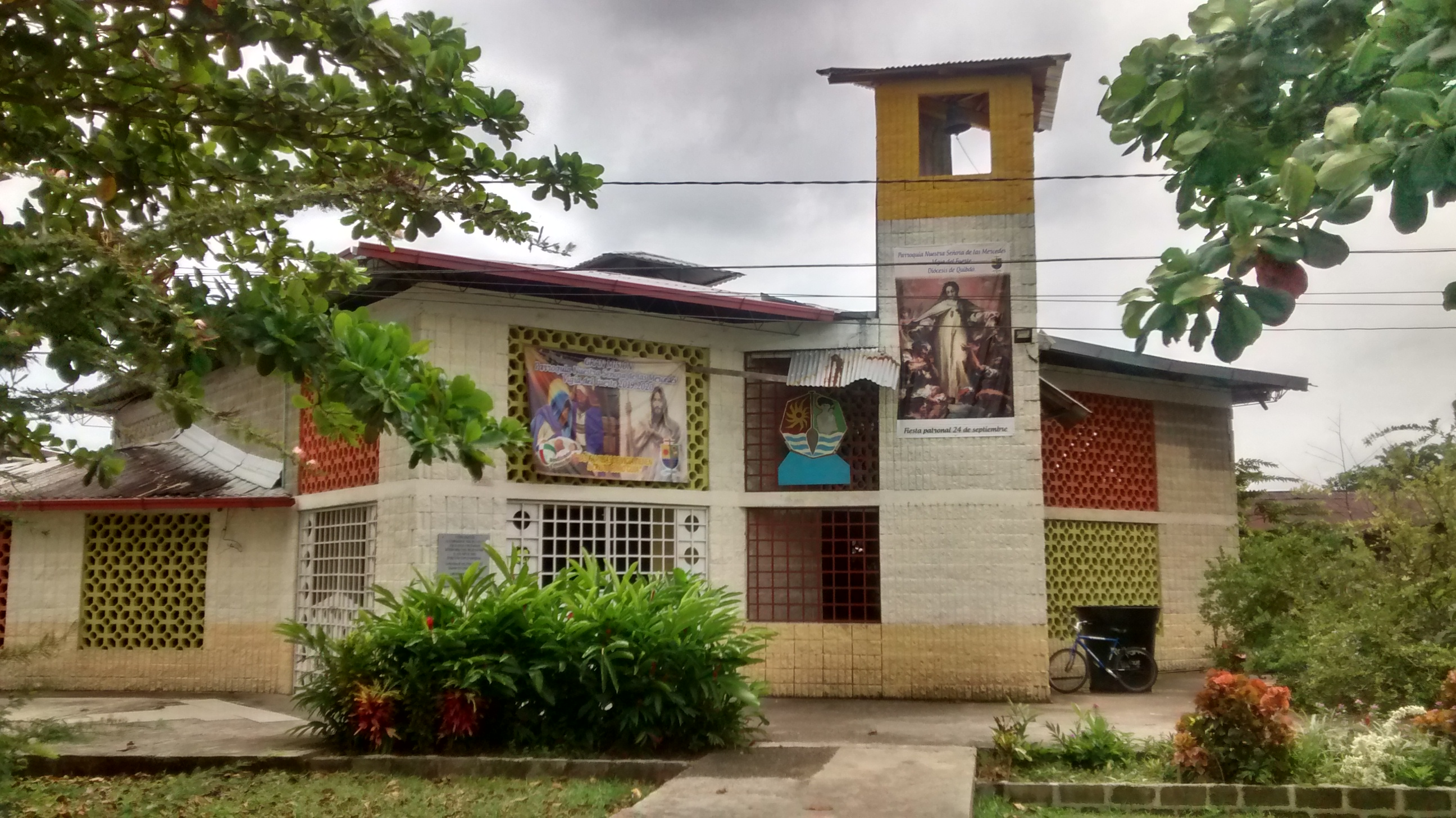
Catholic Church

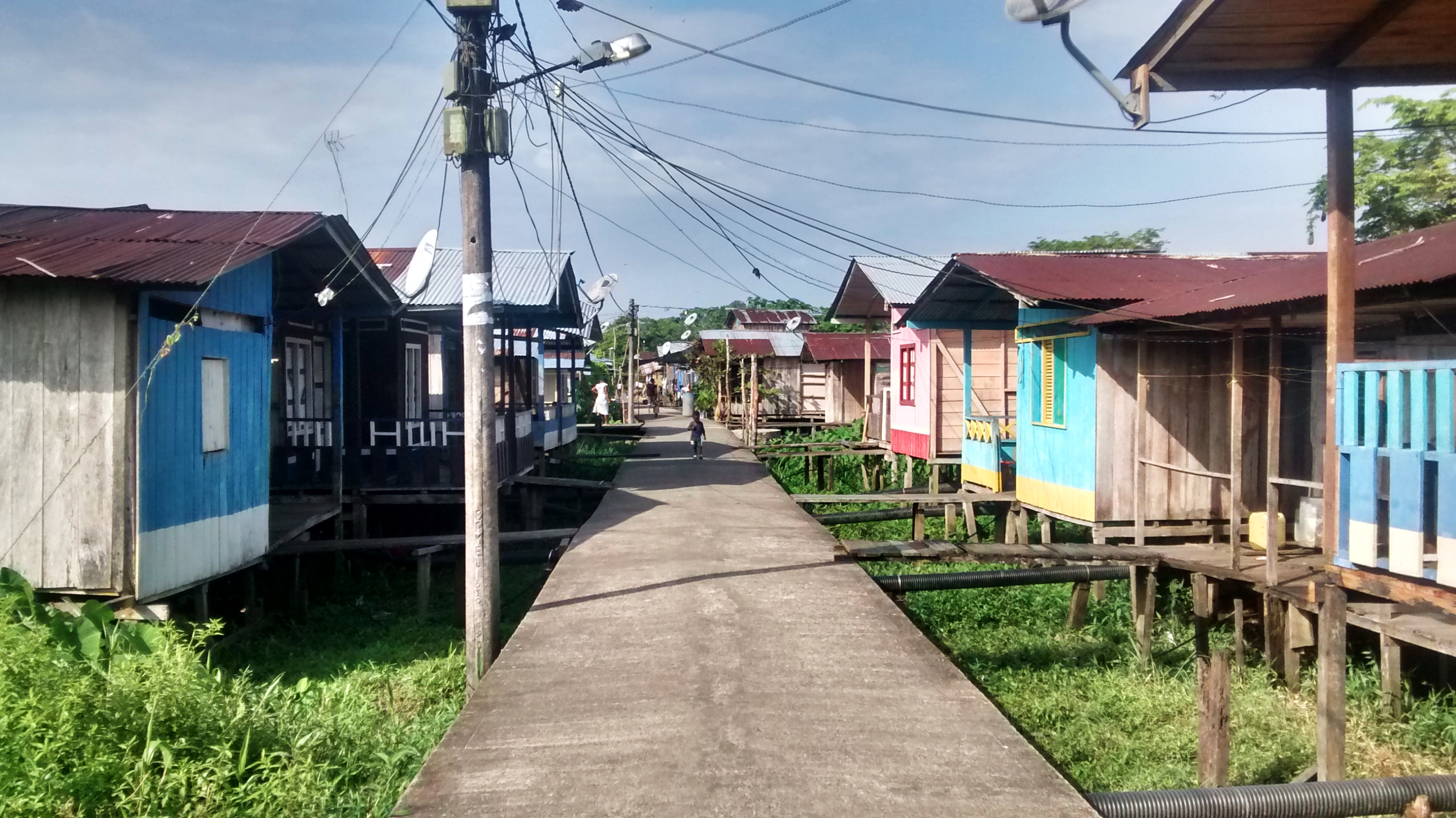
Vigía del Fuerte - Carrera 5a

The fighting and consequent displacement has continued, even after the 2002 Bojayá massacre, or the 2016 peace deal with the FARC. Displacement has forced inhabitants of the region to flee, many whom have settled in Vigía and the neighbouring Bellavista, Quibdó or have left the Chocó region altogether.

== Climate ==
Vigía del Fuerte has a very wet tropical rainforest climate (Af).

Climate data for Vigía del Fuerte
Month	Jan	Feb	Mar	Apr	May	Jun	Jul	Aug	Sep	Oct	Nov	Dec	Year
Mean daily maximum °C (°F)	30.6 (87.1)	30.7 (87.3)	31.1 (88.0)	30.9 (87.6)	29.9 (85.8)	30.0 (86.0)	30.1 (86.2)	30.0 (86.0)	29.4 (84.9)	29.1 (84.4)	29.3 (84.7)	29.8 (85.6)	30.1 (86.1)
Daily mean °C (°F)	26.4 (79.5)	26.5 (79.7)	27.0 (80.6)	26.8 (80.2)	26.4 (79.5)	26.4 (79.5)	26.4 (79.5)	26.3 (79.3)	26.1 (79.0)	25.7 (78.3)	25.7 (78.3)	26.2 (79.2)	26.3 (79.4)
Mean daily minimum °C (°F)	22.2 (72.0)	22.4 (72.3)	22.9 (73.2)	22.8 (73.0)	22.9 (73.2)	22.8 (73.0)	22.7 (72.9)	22.7 (72.9)	22.8 (73.0)	22.4 (72.3)	22.2 (72.0)	22.7 (72.9)	22.6 (72.7)
Average rainfall mm (inches)	327.5 (12.89)	296.6 (11.68)	272.3 (10.72)	454.6 (17.90)	540.5 (21.28)	522.6 (20.57)	524.2 (20.64)	610.5 (24.04)	599.7 (23.61)	534.6 (21.05)	575.4 (22.65)	442.5 (17.42)	5,701 (224.45)
Average rainy days	12	10	10	16	19	18	19	20	20	20	20	17	201
Source: IDEAM
