= Bojayá massacre =

2002 FARC massacre in Colombia

- Part of the Colombian conflict
- The church after the bombing

- Bojayá massacre (Colombia)
- Location: 6.5211°N 76.9726°W; Bojayá, Chocó; Colombia
- Date: 2 May 2002
- Target: Civilians caught in the crossfire between the AUC paramilitaries and FARC guerrillas
- Attack type: Massacre, war crime
- Weapon: IED
- Deaths: 119 civilians (including 45 children)
- Injuries: 98
- Perpetrator: FARC

The Bojayá massacre (Spanish: La Masacre de Bojayá) was a massacre that occurred on May 2, 2002, in the town of Bellavista, Bojayá Municipality, Chocó Department, Colombia. Revolutionary Armed Forces of Colombia (FARC) guerrillas attacked the town in an attempt to take control of the Atrato River region from United Self-Defense Forces of Colombia (AUC) paramilitaries. During the fighting, a gas cylinder bomb (known in Spanish as a pipeta or cilindro bomba) launched at the AUC paramilitaries positioned by the walls of a church from a FARC mortar went through the roof of the church instead, landing on the altar inside and detonating. 119 civilians died in the attack; approximately 300 inhabitants of the town had taken refuge in the church, and 79 died in the explosion.

== Background ==
A 2001 publication prepared by the Colombian Ministry of National Defence, "Annual Report on Human Rights and International Humanitarian Law, 2000", provided the following description of the situation in Bojayá:

"The armed confrontation in the region between the guerrillas and the illegal self-defence forces is very violent due to the economic and strategic interests in play, including, among others: drug trafficking, the inter-oceanic connection, the development of megaprojects like the Panamerican Highway, and the proximity of ports and hydroelectric stations. The region furthermore represents advantages for these groups as a route for the import of arms and supplies from Central America and to provide favourable routes for drug trafficking."

== Preceding events ==
At least 250 paramilitary combatants moved in to Bellavista, the administrative centre of the municipality of Bojayá, on 21 April 2002. They remained there despite protests by local residents. The UNHCHR sent an official communication to the Colombian government on April 23 expressing their concern regarding the presence of the paramilitaries and the possible consequences for the local people. The Ombudsman's Office of Colombia also visited the region on April 26 and released an early warning regarding the threat of an armed confrontation in the area.

Intense fighting broke out on May 1 in a neighboring town, Vigía del Fuerte, and spread to Bellavista later in the day. Around 300 residents took shelter in the local church, 100 in the adjoining parsonage, and another 100 in the Augustinian Missionary residence, over the course of the night.

== Details of the attack ==
According to the official UN investigation report, in the morning of May 2 the AUC paramilitaries had established positions around the church, using the rare concrete buildings and the cement wall around the church yard for protection. The FARC took up positions to the north (in Barrio Pueblo Nuevo), and began launching gas cylinder bombs (pipetas) toward the paramilitary positions. Two of the bombs landed nearby and the third went through the roof of the church, where it exploded on the altar.

The UN investigation found the FARC in violation of several principles of international humanitarian law, including an indiscriminate attack causing unnecessary civilian casualties, failure to distinguish between civilian and combatant, failure to take efforts to protect civilians from avoidable harm, and attacks against cultural property. Prohibitions against these acts are found in Common Article 3 of the 1949 Geneva Conventions and Articles 4, 13, and 16 of Additional Protocol II. The UN also considered the FARC responsible for the forced displacement of civilians generated as a consequence of the attack on the church, placing the act in violation of Article 17 of Protocol II.

The UN found the AUC to be in violation of various aspects of international humanitarian law, including using civilians as human shields, failing to protect civilians from the effects of their military operations, and for causing massive forced displacement of civilian populations in the region due to their acts, threats and combat operations in the area. Given reports of theft by the AUC of goods, equipment and vehicles belonging to local residents, the UN also found the AUC guilty of pillage (a violation of Article 17 of Protocol II).

The UNHCHR additionally found that the Colombian government failed to act, in order to prevent the massive human suffering which ensued from the events in Bojaya; suffering that was predicted and of which the government was explicitly warned of beforehand.

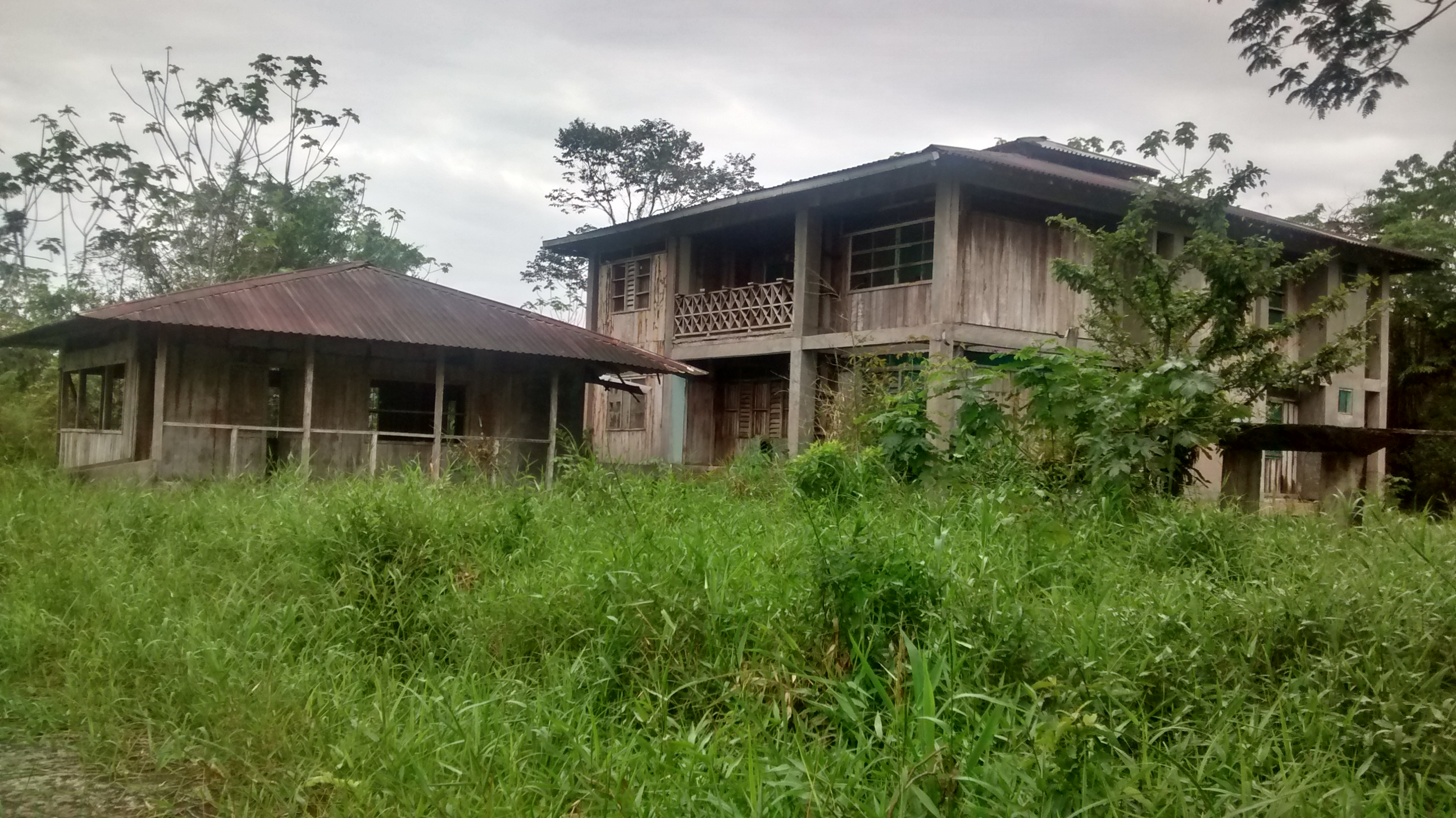
The residence of the Augustinian Nuns as of 2020, where around 100 people took refuge during the fighting in 2002, now abandoned.

== Bellavista Nuevo ==
The attack caused significant physical damage to Bellavista. In its aftermath, some 4,000 citizens fled Bojayá, including all residents of Bellavista. Five days after the attack the Colombian government announced that a new town would be constructed. Support from the residents of Bellavista for this decision was largely favourable, though not unanimous. Siting and planning was undertaken by graduate students at Universidad Javeriana in Bogotá, who selected a location roughly one kilometre from the old town for its low risk of flooding.

The buildings of the new settlement were well-constructed, and connected to a network of municipal utilities and services. The original town of Bellavista was abandoned, and is now referred to as Bellavista Viejo ("Old Bellavista"). The new settlement took the name Bellavista Nuevo.

== Responsibility of the state ==
The First Administrative Court of Quibdo, Chocó sentenced the Colombian State to a billion and a half Colombian peso compensation to relatives of two of the dead victims on May 29, 2008. It ruled the State was administratively responsible and had neglected to protect its citizens, despite the warnings of the ombudsman.

== Death of perpetrator ==
At dawn of 22 February 2012, nearly 10 years after the event, a Colombian Air Force Embraer EMB 314 Super Tucano identified the camp of FARC's 57th Front, 15 kilometers north of Bojayá near the border with Panama. The Super Tucano dropped two high-precision bombs, destroying the camp and killing six FARC rebels (including Pedro Alfonso Alvarado a.k.a. "Mapanao"), who are believed to have been responsible for the massacre.

== See also ==
- List of massacres in Colombia
- Domingo Chalá
