= Belén de Bajirá =

Nuevo Belén de Bajirá
- Municipality
- Location of the municipality and town of Belén de Bajirá in Chocó Department of Colombia

- Location in Colombia
- Coordinates: 07°22′21″N 76°42′53″W
- Country: Colombia
- Department: Chocó Department

Area
  - Total: 2,015 km^{2} (778 sq mi)

Population
  - Total: 13,438
  - Density: 6.669/km^{2} (17.27/sq mi)
- Time zone: UTC-05:00 (Colombia Standard Time)

Nuevo Belén de Bajirá is a Municipalities of Colombia in Chocó Department. It is located in the Urabá subregion.

The place is rich in gold, nickel, oil, copper, petrol and oil palm, but its population is evidently poor.

In December 2022, New Belén de Bajirá becoming the municipality separates from the Riosucio.

== Climate ==
New Belén de Bajirá has a tropical rainforest climate (Af) with heavy to very heavy rainfall year-round.

Climate data for Belén de Bajirá
Month	Jan	Feb	Mar	Apr	May	Jun	Jul	Aug	Sep	Oct	Nov	Dec	Year
Mean daily maximum °C (°F)	30.1 (86.2)	30.3 (86.5)	30.9 (87.6)	30.9 (87.6)	29.4 (84.9)	29.5 (85.1)	29.8 (85.6)	29.7 (85.5)	29.2 (84.6)	28.9 (84.0)	29.0 (84.2)	29.2 (84.6)	29.7 (85.5)
Daily mean °C (°F)	26.1 (79.0)	26.5 (79.7)	27.0 (80.6)	26.9 (80.4)	26.2 (79.2)	26.1 (79.0)	26.3 (79.3)	26.2 (79.2)	26.0 (78.8)	25.8 (78.4)	25.8 (78.4)	25.8 (78.4)	26.2 (79.2)
Mean daily minimum °C (°F)	22.2 (72.0)	22.8 (73.0)	23.1 (73.6)	23.0 (73.4)	23.1 (73.6)	22.8 (73.0)	22.9 (73.2)	22.8 (73.0)	22.9 (73.2)	22.8 (73.0)	22.7 (72.9)	22.5 (72.5)	22.8 (73.0)
Average rainfall mm (inches)	110 (4.3)	96 (3.8)	97 (3.8)	308 (12.1)	449 (17.7)	482 (19.0)	451 (17.8)	502 (19.8)	434 (17.1)	481 (18.9)	432 (17.0)	304 (12.0)	4,146 (163.3)
