= El Cantón de San Pablo =

Coordinates: 5°20′N 76°44′W

- Municipality and town
- Flag

- Location of the municipality and town of El Cantón de San Pablo in the Chocó Department of Colombia.
- Country: Colombia
- Department: Chocó Department

Area
  - Municipality and town: 386 km^{2} (149 sq mi)

Population (2015)
  - Municipality and town: 7,970
  - Urban: 3,486
- Time zone: UTC-5 (Colombia Standard Time)

El Cantón de San Pablo is a municipality and town in the Chocó Department, Colombia.

== Climate ==
El Cantón de San Pablo has a very wet tropical rainforest climate (Af). The following data is for Managrú, the capital of the municipality.

Climate data for Managrú
Month	Jan	Feb	Mar	Apr	May	Jun	Jul	Aug	Sep	Oct	Nov	Dec	Year
Mean daily maximum °C (°F)	30.1 (86.2)	29.9 (85.8)	30.5 (86.9)	30.3 (86.5)	30.4 (86.7)	30.1 (86.2)	30.4 (86.7)	30.3 (86.5)	30.2 (86.4)	29.7 (85.5)	29.5 (85.1)	29.7 (85.5)	30.1 (86.2)
Daily mean °C (°F)	26.5 (79.7)	26.3 (79.3)	26.8 (80.2)	26.8 (80.2)	26.8 (80.2)	26.5 (79.7)	26.7 (80.1)	26.6 (79.9)	26.6 (79.9)	26.2 (79.2)	26.1 (79.0)	26.3 (79.3)	26.5 (79.7)
Mean daily minimum °C (°F)	23.0 (73.4)	22.8 (73.0)	23.2 (73.8)	23.3 (73.9)	23.2 (73.8)	23.0 (73.4)	23.1 (73.6)	23.0 (73.4)	23.0 (73.4)	22.8 (73.0)	22.8 (73.0)	22.9 (73.2)	23.0 (73.4)
Average rainfall mm (inches)	534 (21.0)	492 (19.4)	476 (18.7)	618 (24.3)	650 (25.6)	657 (25.9)	614 (24.2)	780 (30.7)	739 (29.1)	747 (29.4)	634 (25.0)	575 (22.6)	7,516 (295.9)
Average rainy days	16	14	15	18	19	18	19	18	18	17	16	15	203
