= Río Iró =

Coordinates: 5.18333°N 76.4833°W

- Municipality and town
- Flag

- Location of the municipality and town of Río Iró in the Chocó Department of Colombia.
- Country: Colombia
- Department: Chocó Department

Area
  - Total: 892 km^{2} (344 sq mi)

Population (Census 2018)
  - Total: 4,525
  - Density: 5.07/km^{2} (13.1/sq mi)
- Time zone: UTC-5 (Colombia Standard Time)

Río Iró is a municipality and town in the Chocó Department, Colombia.
