= Medio Atrato =

Coordinates: 5°59′42″N 76°46′57″W

- Municipality and town
- Flag

- Location of the municipality and town of Medio Atrato in the Chocó Department of Colombia.
- Country: Colombia
- Department: Chocó Department

Area
  - Municipality and town: 562 km^{2} (217 sq mi)
- Elevation: 25 m (82 ft)

Population (2015)
  - Municipality and town: 29,487
  - Density: 52.47/km^{2} (135.9/sq mi)
  - Urban: 1,093
- Time zone: UTC-5 (Colombia Standard Time)

Medio Atrato (Spanish pronunciation: [ˈmeðjo aˈtɾato]) is a municipality and town in the Chocó Department, Colombia.

== Climate ==
Medio Atrato has an extremely wet tropical rainforest climate (Af).

Climate data for Medio Atrato
Month	Jan	Feb	Mar	Apr	May	Jun	Jul	Aug	Sep	Oct	Nov	Dec	Year
Mean daily maximum °C (°F)	30.9 (87.6)	30.8 (87.4)	31.1 (88.0)	31.0 (87.8)	30.5 (86.9)	30.5 (86.9)	30.5 (86.9)	30.6 (87.1)	30.3 (86.5)	29.8 (85.6)	30.1 (86.2)	30.4 (86.7)	30.5 (87.0)
Daily mean °C (°F)	26.8 (80.2)	26.7 (80.1)	27.0 (80.6)	27.0 (80.6)	26.7 (80.1)	26.7 (80.1)	26.6 (79.9)	26.8 (80.2)	26.7 (80.1)	26.2 (79.2)	26.4 (79.5)	26.6 (79.9)	26.7 (80.0)
Mean daily minimum °C (°F)	22.7 (72.9)	22.6 (72.7)	23.0 (73.4)	23.1 (73.6)	23.0 (73.4)	22.9 (73.2)	22.8 (73.0)	23.0 (73.4)	23.1 (73.6)	22.6 (72.7)	22.7 (72.9)	22.9 (73.2)	22.9 (73.2)
Average rainfall mm (inches)	581.4 (22.89)	484.0 (19.06)	528.6 (20.81)	746.7 (29.40)	817.8 (32.20)	729.0 (28.70)	785.2 (30.91)	828.8 (32.63)	659.6 (25.97)	665.9 (26.22)	728.5 (28.68)	692.2 (27.25)	8,247.7 (324.72)
Average rainy days	14	11	12	18	20	19	19	19	18	17	18	18	203
