= Baudot =

Baudot may refer to:

People:

- Marc Antoine Baudot (1765-1837), deputy during the French Revolution
- Émile Baudot (1845-1903), French telegraph engineer, inventor of the Baudot code
- Marie-Antoinette Tonnelat (née Baudot) (1912-1980), French theoretical physicist
- Anatole de Baudot (1834-1915), French architect

Technology:

- Baudot code, a way to encode characters for sending over a communication channel
