= Río Quito =

- Municipality and town
- Flag

- Location of the municipality and town of Río Quito in the Chocó Department of Colombia
- Coordinates: 5°28′58″N 76°44′23″W
- Country: Colombia
- Department: Chocó Department

Area
  - Total: 70,000 km^{2} (27,000 sq mi)

Population (2011)
  - Total: 8,000
- Time zone: UTC-5 (Colombia Standard Time)

Río Quito is a municipality and town in the Chocó Department, Colombia. The capital of Río Quito is Paimadó.

== Background ==
=== Climate ===
Rio Quito has a very wet tropical rainforest climate (Af). The following climate data is for Paimadó, the capital of the municipality.

Climate data for Río Quito (San Isidro), elevation 45 m (148 ft), (1981–2010)
Month	Jan	Feb	Mar	Apr	May	Jun	Jul	Aug	Sep	Oct	Nov	Dec	Year
Mean daily maximum °C (°F)	30.0 (86.0)	30.5 (86.9)	30.7 (87.3)	31.1 (88.0)	31.3 (88.3)	31.1 (88.0)	31.1 (88.0)	31.2 (88.2)	31.0 (87.8)	30.6 (87.1)	30.2 (86.4)	30.0 (86.0)	30.8 (87.4)
Daily mean °C (°F)	26.0 (78.8)	26.3 (79.3)	26.6 (79.9)	26.6 (79.9)	26.6 (79.9)	26.5 (79.7)	26.5 (79.7)	26.4 (79.5)	26.3 (79.3)	26.0 (78.8)	25.9 (78.6)	25.9 (78.6)	26.3 (79.3)
Mean daily minimum °C (°F)	23.0 (73.4)	23.1 (73.6)	23.0 (73.4)	23.3 (73.9)	23.3 (73.9)	23.1 (73.6)	22.8 (73.0)	22.8 (73.0)	22.8 (73.0)	22.8 (73.0)	23.0 (73.4)	22.8 (73.0)	22.9 (73.2)
Average precipitation mm (inches)	516.0 (20.31)	469.6 (18.49)	493.6 (19.43)	601.8 (23.69)	625.6 (24.63)	648.3 (25.52)	708.8 (27.91)	723.9 (28.50)	542.5 (21.36)	507.4 (19.98)	561.7 (22.11)	501.8 (19.76)	6,792.3 (267.41)
Average precipitation days	24	20	21	24	26	25	26	26	26	25	25	25	288
Average relative humidity (%)	90	88	88	88	88	88	88	88	88	88	89	90	88
Source: Instituto de Hidrologia Meteorologia y Estudios Ambientales
