= Quito Square =

Square in Bucharest, Romania

Coordinates: 44°27′25.35″N 26°5′29.26″E

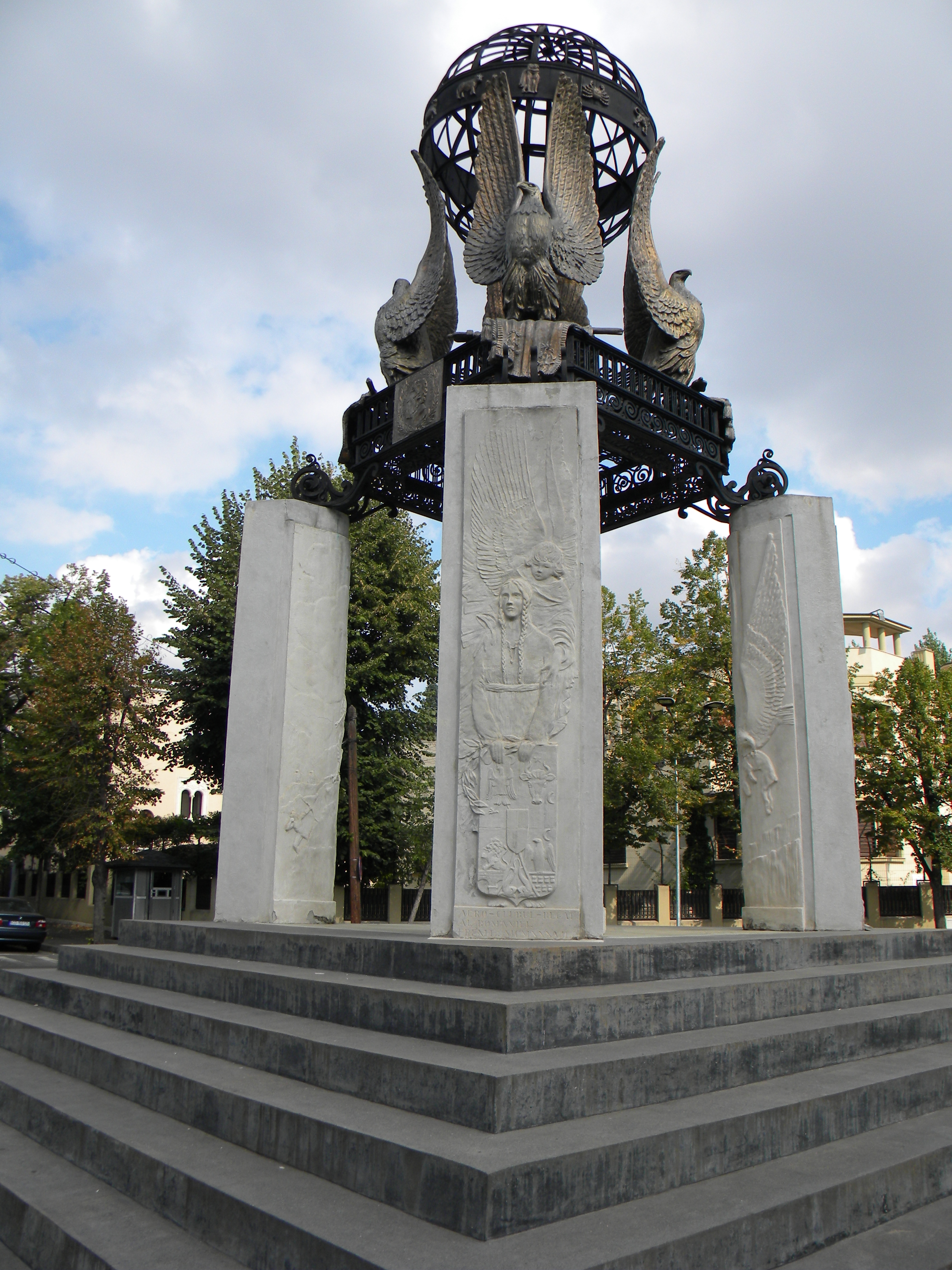
The monument in Quito Square, recently restored

Quito Square (Piața Quito) is located in the center of Bucharest, near Victory Square, right in the middle of Paris Street.

At its centre is a sculpture dedicated to Mircea Zorileanu (October 14, 1883 – February 10, 1919), one of the pioneers of aviation in Romania, the second best aviator in Romania. On June 22, 1905, Mircea Zorileanu was promoted to the rank of second lieutenant, being assigned to the 1st Roșiori regiment in Galați. In the summer of 1910, he suffered an injury during horse riding; due to his fractures he was declared unfit for riding. While recovering in the summer of 1910, he became interested in aviation, especially after Louis Blériot's first flight to Romania on October 31, 1909. In the autumn of 1910, with the little money he had, he traveled to France to attend Roger Sommer's Blériot aviation school, at Mourmelon-le-Grand. He attended the school from November 12, 1910 to February 13, 1911, but did not obtain a pilot's license at that time. When he returned to Romania, Zorileanu was asked to demonstrate his skills at Prince George Valentin Bibescu's flight school in Bucharest. on July 15, 1911 he executed before a military commission a flight with a Blériot monoplane, following which he received the second flight license granted in Romania.

On one of the corners of Quito Square is the villa of engineer and builder Emil Prager, where he lived with his whole family. The project, in the Art Deco style, was carried out by the architect Arghir Culina between 1930 and 1932.
