= Bojayá =

- Municipality
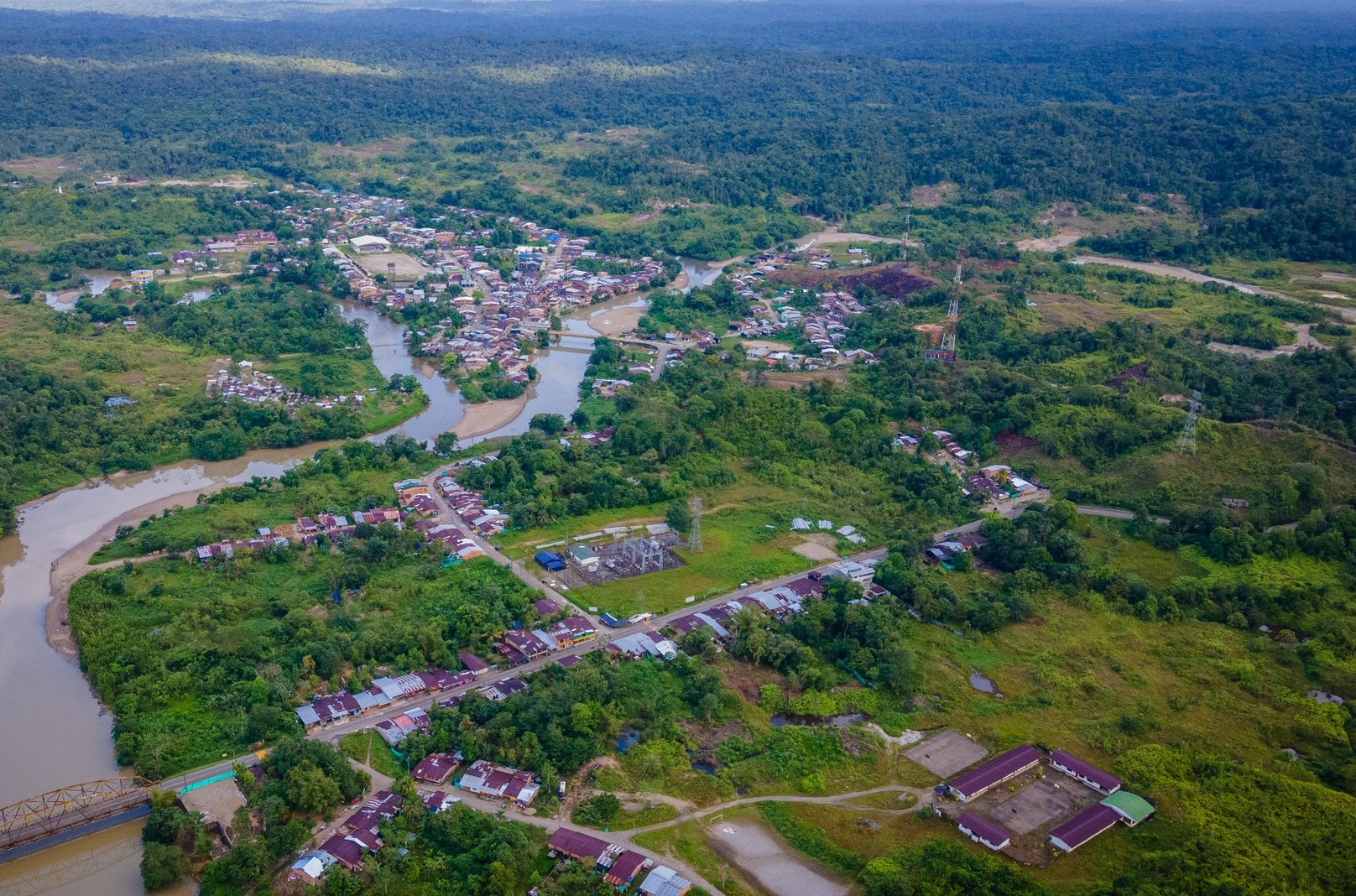

- Flag Coat of arms
- Motto: "Creatividad, Trabajo y Decisión" transl. Creativity, work and decision
- The municipality of Bojayá within the Chocó Department of Colombia. Its municipal centre, Bellavista Nuevo, is midway along its eastern edge.
- Coordinates: 6°31′25″N 76°58′28″W
- Country: Colombia
- Department: Chocó Department

Area
  - Municipality: 3,693 km^{2} (1,426 sq mi)

Population (2005)
  - Municipality: 9,941
  - Urban: 4,572
- Estimation by DANE - Government of Colombia
- Time zone: UTC-5 (Colombia Standard Time)

Bojayá (Spanish pronunciation: [boxaˈʝa]) is a municipality in the Chocó Department, Colombia. Its municipal centre is Bellavista Nuevo.

== Bojaya municipality ==
The Bojaya municipality, according to a 2005 census, has 9,941 inhabitants. 58.4% of the population of the municipality are Afro-Colombian, and 41.4% are indigenous Embera. 95.86% of the population do not have their basic needs met.

The municipality contains part of the Utría National Natural Park.

There has been a long-enduring presence of paramilitary and National Liberation Army forces in the region, with tensions and violence between the groups still a significant threat to its population.

== Bojayá massacre ==
On May 2, 2002, FARC guerrillas conducted an attack on members of the United Self-Defense Forces of Colombia present within Bellavista. The FARC had established their presence in the town the previous month, with the attack catalysed by the break-out of fighting in nearby Vigía del Fuerte. Amid the fighting, a gas cylinder bomb fired from a FARC improvised mortar, directed at USDFC forces positioned behind the town's church, missed its target, breaking through the church roof and detonating, with the blast killing 79 of the roughly 300 civilians sheltering inside. In full, the attack resulted in 119 civilian deaths, 49 of which were children, 98 injured citizens, significant physical damage to much of the town and the fleeing of its remaining residents. The attack is since referred to as the Bojayá massacre. Now referred to as Bellavista Viejo (Old Bellavista), the town was abandoned, with its returning citizens having been rehomed in a settlement newly-built nearby.

== Bellavista Nuevo ==
The decision to build a new town for the citizens of Bellavista was announced by president Andrés Pastrana five days after the Boyaja Massacre. The attack had resulted in the deaths of 119 residents, left 98 injured, damaged much of the town, and its remaining population were among the roughly 4,000 citizens who fled Bojayá in its aftermath. The majority of the town was in favour of the intention to relocate, but not unanimously.

The project of this new town was assigned to an interdisciplinary group of graduate students studying urban and regional planning at Universidad Javeriana. They selected a site 800 metres from Bellavista, primarily for its lower risk of flooding, a reality not exclusive to Bellavista but rather common to the region. The planned town was to have buildings constructed of concrete, including 265 houses, which were to be connected to a network of utilities and services. Construction began in 2003, and the town was inaugurated in 2007 as Bellavista Nuevo (New Bellavista), and the original town was renamed Bellavista Viejo (Old Bellavista).

After the massacre, only a part of the population remained or returned to Bojayá. Half of the inhabitants of the region live in its municipal centre. The remains of the victims of the massacre are buried in the new town and a mausoleum has also been built in their memory.

== Bellavista Viejo ==
The old town, Bellavista Viejo, is currently completely abandoned. The church damaged in the bombing, San Pablo Apóstol, has been restored after the massacre, and is being maintained in memory of the tragic event. An annual memorial is held in the church on the second of May. During this service el Christo Mutilado de Bojaya, a statue of Christ mutilated in the massacre, is brought from the new church in Bellavista Nuevo to Bellavista Viejo in a procession by river.

== Climate ==
Bojayá has a very wet tropical rainforest climate, as shown in these data from Bellavista Nuevo.

Climate data for Bellavista Nuevo
| Month | Jan | Feb | Mar | Apr | May | Jun | Jul | Aug | Sep | Oct | Nov | Dec | Year |
|---|---|---|---|---|---|---|---|---|---|---|---|---|---|
| Mean daily maximum °C (°F) | 30.5 (86.9) | 30.5 (86.9) | 30.9 (87.6) | 30.8 (87.4) | 29.8 (85.6) | 29.9 (85.8) | 30.0 (86.0) | 29.9 (85.8) | 29.2 (84.6) | 28.9 (84.0) | 29.1 (84.4) | 29.8 (85.6) | 29.9 (85.9) |
| Daily mean °C (°F) | 26.3 (79.3) | 26.3 (79.3) | 26.2 (79.2) | 26.3 (79.3) | 26.2 (79.2) | 26.3 (79.3) | 26.3 (79.3) | 26.2 (79.2) | 25.8 (78.4) | 25.5 (77.9) | 25.5 (77.9) | 26.2 (79.2) | 26.1 (79.0) |
| Mean daily minimum °C (°F) | 22.1 (71.8) | 22.2 (72.0) | 22.6 (72.7) | 22.8 (73.0) | 22.7 (72.9) | 22.7 (72.9) | 22.6 (72.7) | 22.6 (72.7) | 22.5 (72.5) | 22.2 (72.0) | 22.0 (71.6) | 22.6 (72.7) | 22.5 (72.5) |
| Average rainfall mm (inches) | 362.8 (14.28) | 288.9 (11.37) | 284.2 (11.19) | 460.1 (18.11) | 482.3 (18.99) | 409.4 (16.12) | 512.3 (20.17) | 495.1 (19.49) | 398.7 (15.70) | 421.4 (16.59) | 481.5 (18.96) | 470.3 (18.52) | 5,067 (199.49) |
| Average rainy days | 17 | 14 | 15 | 21 | 23 | 23 | 23 | 24 | 23 | 24 | 23 | 23 | 253 |
Source: Institute of Hydrology, Meteorology and Environmental Studies (Colombia)

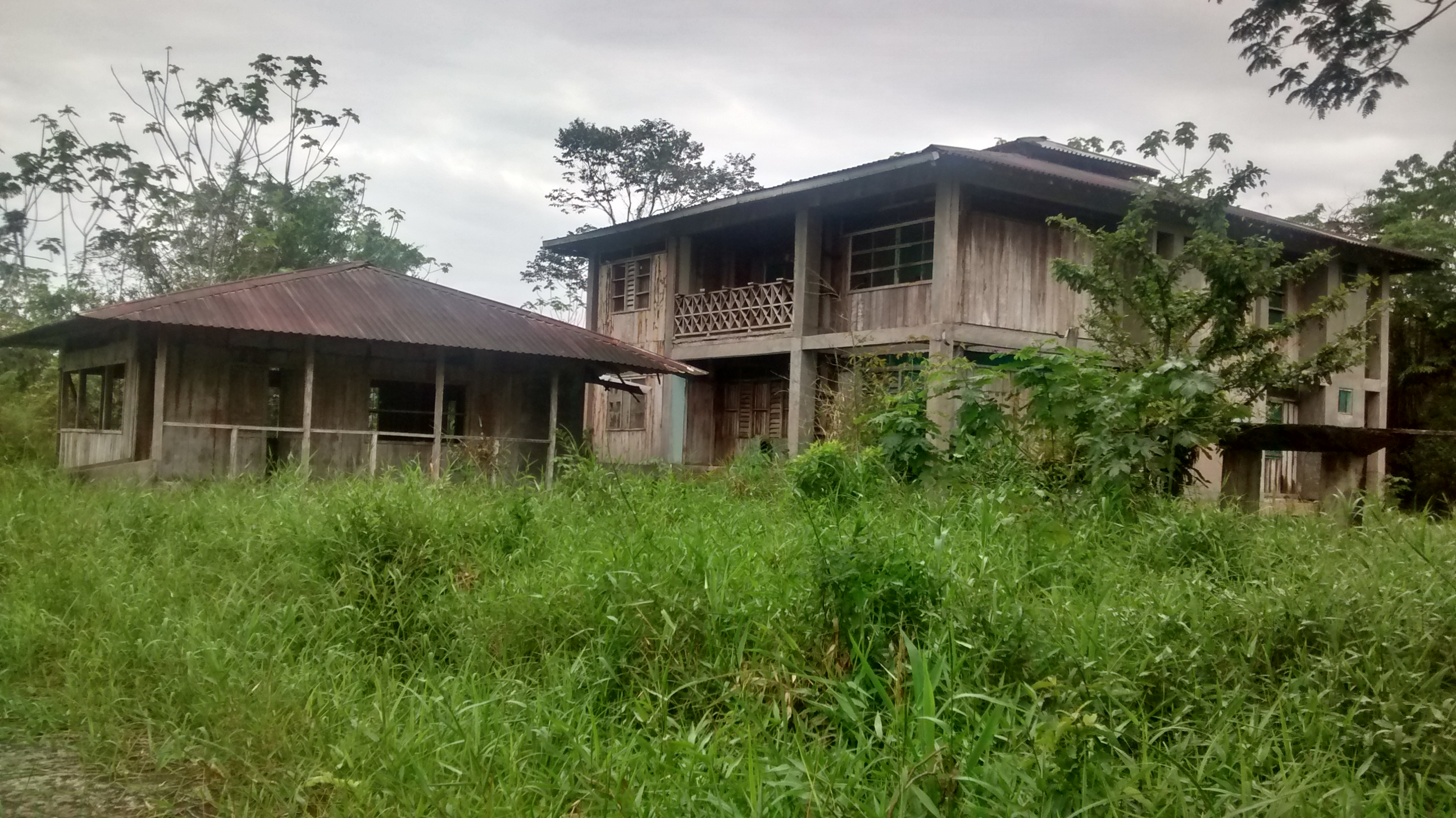
Casa de las Hermanas Agustinas, here about 100 inhabitants took refuge during the massacre in 2002.

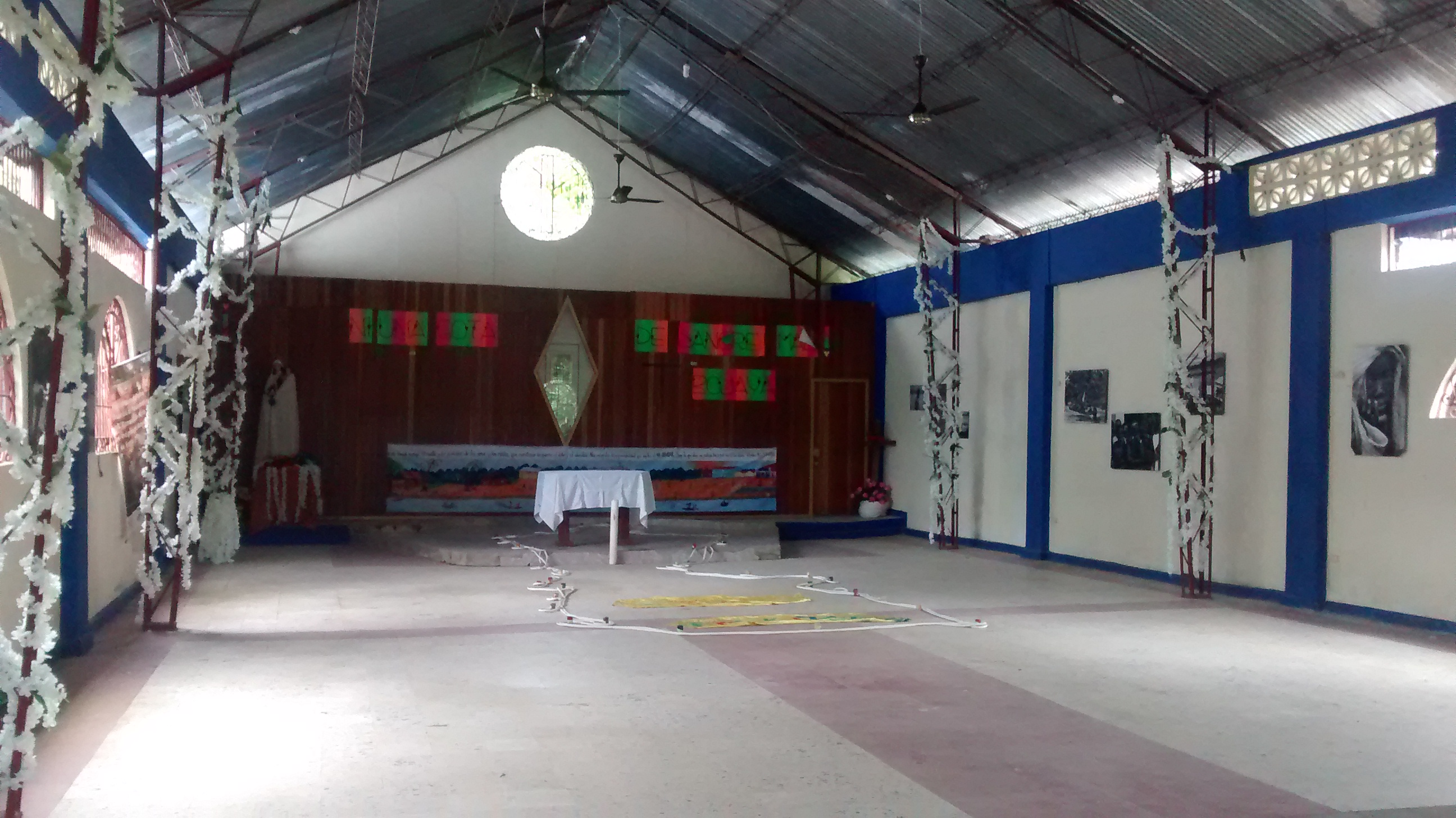
The current interior of the Bellavista Viejo church, where the Bojayá Massacre took place in 2002.

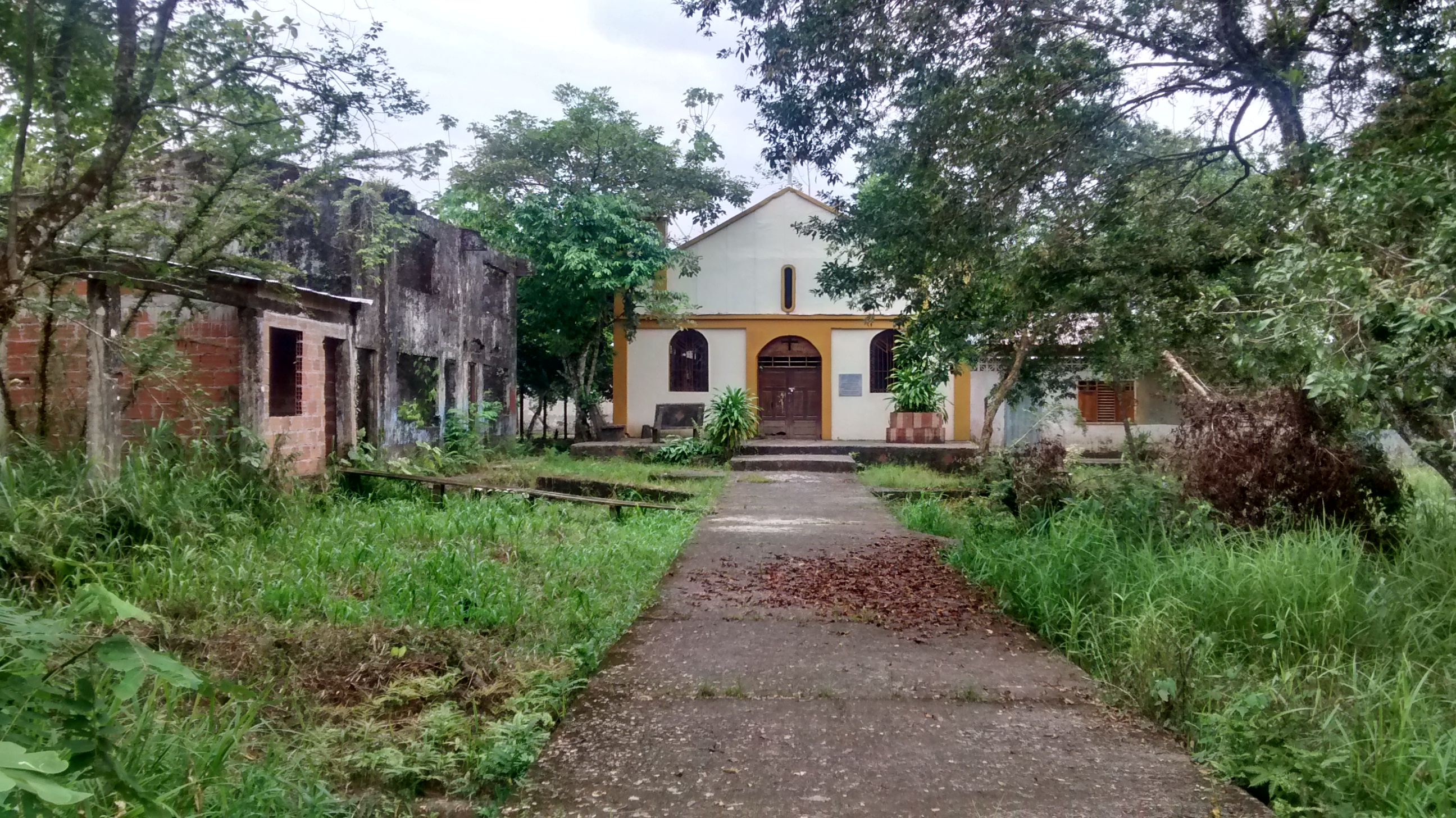
Bellavista Viejo, abandoned, on the left: part of the old school; centre: The restored church.
