= Alto Baudó =

Coordinates: 5°32′N 77°00′W

- Municipality and town
- Location of the municipality and town of Alto Baudó in the Chocó Department of Colombia.
- Country: Colombia
- Department: Chocó Department
- Founded: November 25, 1958

Government
  - Mayor: Carmen Edithza Londoño Mosquera

Area
  - Municipality and town: 1,532 km^{2} (592 sq mi)

Population (2015)
  - Density: 24/km^{2} (62/sq mi)
  - Urban: 9,563
  - Metro: 36,773
- Time zone: UTC-5 (Colombia Standard Time)

Alto Baudó (Spanish pronunciation: [ˈalto βawˈðo]) is a municipality and town in the Chocó Department, Colombia.

The municipality contains part of the Utría National Natural Park.

== Climate ==
Alto Baudó has a very wet tropical rainforest climate (Af). The following data is for Pie de Pato, the capital of the municipality.

Climate data for Pie de Pato
Month	Jan	Feb	Mar	Apr	May	Jun	Jul	Aug	Sep	Oct	Nov	Dec	Year
Mean daily maximum °C (°F)	29.5 (85.1)	29.4 (84.9)	29.8 (85.6)	29.7 (85.5)	29.7 (85.5)	29.4 (84.9)	29.5 (85.1)	29.4 (84.9)	29.3 (84.7)	28.7 (83.7)	28.9 (84.0)	29.0 (84.2)	29.4 (84.8)
Daily mean °C (°F)	25.9 (78.6)	25.8 (78.4)	26.1 (79.0)	26.1 (79.0)	26.2 (79.2)	25.9 (78.6)	25.9 (78.6)	25.9 (78.6)	25.9 (78.6)	25.4 (77.7)	25.6 (78.1)	25.6 (78.1)	25.9 (78.5)
Mean daily minimum °C (°F)	22.4 (72.3)	22.2 (72.0)	22.5 (72.5)	22.6 (72.7)	22.7 (72.9)	22.4 (72.3)	22.4 (72.3)	22.4 (72.3)	22.5 (72.5)	22.2 (72.0)	22.3 (72.1)	22.3 (72.1)	22.4 (72.3)
Average rainfall mm (inches)	461.3 (18.16)	407.3 (16.04)	401.1 (15.79)	557.7 (21.96)	516.7 (20.34)	567.4 (22.34)	582.7 (22.94)	643.7 (25.34)	570.9 (22.48)	567.8 (22.35)	619.2 (24.38)	494.5 (19.47)	6,390.3 (251.59)
Average rainy days	14	12	13	16	18	18	19	19	18	18	19	18	202
