= Atrato =

Coordinates: 10°04′N 74°12′W

- Municipality and town
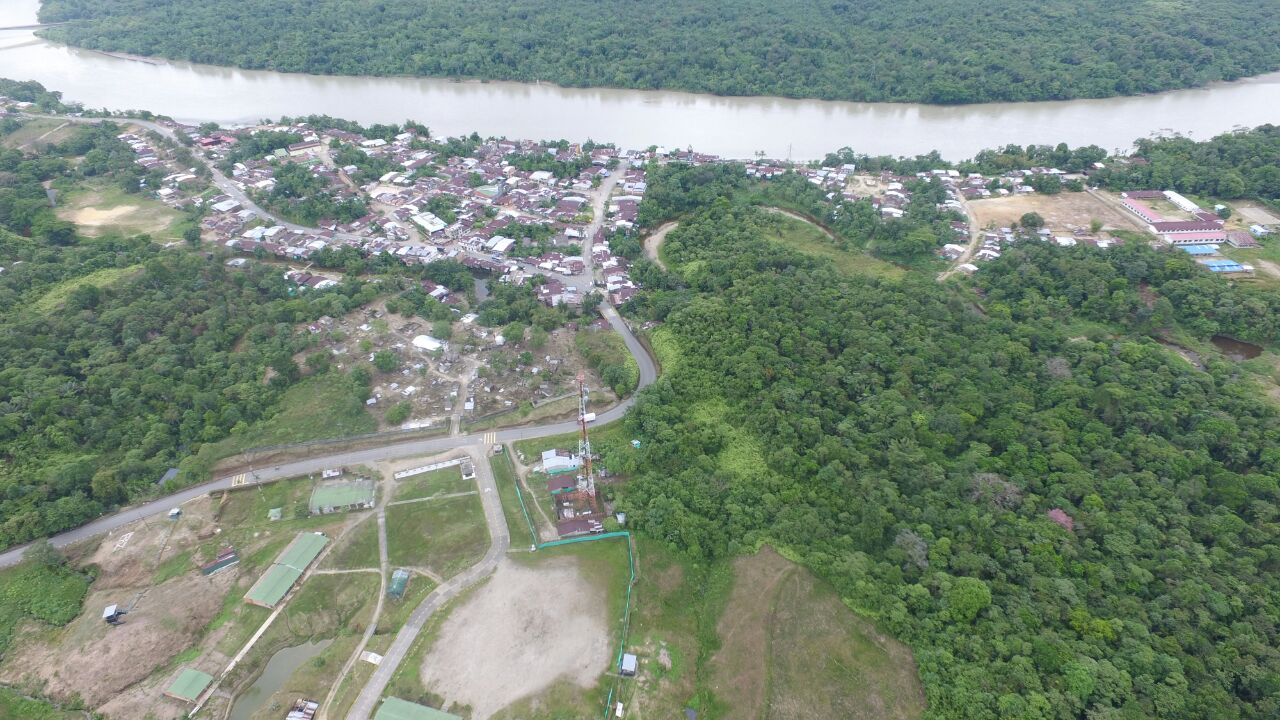
- View of Atrato

- Flag

- Location of the municipality and town of Atrato in the Chocó Department of Colombia.
- Country: Colombia
- Department: Chocó Department

Area
  - Total: 725 km^{2} (280 sq mi)

Population (Census 2018)
  - Total: 5,519
  - Density: 7.61/km^{2} (19.7/sq mi)
- Time zone: UTC-5 (Colombia Standard Time)

Atrato is a municipality and town in the Chocó Department near the Pacific Ocean, Colombia.

== Climate ==
Atrato has an extremely wet tropical rainforest climate (Af). The following climate data is for Yutó, the capital of the municipality.

Climate data for Atrato
Month	Jan	Feb	Mar	Apr	May	Jun	Jul	Aug	Sep	Oct	Nov	Dec	Year
Mean daily maximum °C (°F)	29.9 (85.8)	29.9 (85.8)	30.3 (86.5)	30.2 (86.4)	30.1 (86.2)	30.0 (86.0)	30.1 (86.2)	30.1 (86.2)	30.0 (86.0)	29.5 (85.1)	29.4 (84.9)	29.6 (85.3)	29.9 (85.9)
Daily mean °C (°F)	26.1 (79.0)	26.1 (79.0)	26.5 (79.7)	26.5 (79.7)	26.4 (79.5)	26.2 (79.2)	26.3 (79.3)	26.3 (79.3)	26.3 (79.3)	25.9 (78.6)	25.8 (78.4)	26.0 (78.8)	26.2 (79.1)
Mean daily minimum °C (°F)	22.4 (72.3)	22.3 (72.1)	22.7 (72.9)	22.8 (73.0)	22.7 (72.9)	22.5 (72.5)	22.5 (72.5)	22.5 (72.5)	22.6 (72.7)	22.3 (72.1)	22.3 (72.1)	22.4 (72.3)	22.5 (72.5)
Average rainfall mm (inches)	607.2 (23.91)	516.7 (20.34)	526.1 (20.71)	672.0 (26.46)	795.9 (31.33)	776.8 (30.58)	768.5 (30.26)	867.7 (34.16)	742.9 (29.25)	724.6 (28.53)	722.2 (28.43)	598.4 (23.56)	8,319 (327.52)
