= Bajo Baudó =

- Municipality and town
- Flag

- Location of the municipality and town of Bajo Baudó in the Chocó Department of Colombia.
- Coordinates: 4°57′N 77°22′W
- Country: Colombia
- Department: Chocó Department
- Founded: 1821

Area
  - Total: 4,840 km^{2} (1,870 sq mi)
- Elevation: 12 m (39 ft)

Population (Census 2018)
  - Total: 18,561
  - Density: 3.83/km^{2} (9.93/sq mi)
- Demonym: Bajobaudoseño
- Time zone: UTC-5 (Colombia Standard Time)
- Area code: 57-4
- Website: Official website (in Spanish)

Bajo Baudó (Spanish pronunciation: [ˈbaxo βawˈðo]) is a municipality and town in the Chocó Department, Colombia. It was founded in 1821 and converted into a municipality in 1825. Most of the town's population of 16,375 live in rural areas.

== Climate ==
Bajo Baudó has a very wet tropical rainforest climate (Af) with very heavy to extremely heavy rainfall year-round.

Climate data for Bajo Baudó
Month	Jan	Feb	Mar	Apr	May	Jun	Jul	Aug	Sep	Oct	Nov	Dec	Year
Mean daily maximum °C (°F)	29.8 (85.6)	29.9 (85.8)	30.3 (86.5)	30.4 (86.7)	30.3 (86.5)	30.0 (86.0)	30.0 (86.0)	29.6 (85.3)	29.3 (84.7)	28.9 (84.0)	29.0 (84.2)	29.3 (84.7)	29.7 (85.5)
Daily mean °C (°F)	26.0 (78.8)	26.0 (78.8)	26.3 (79.3)	26.5 (79.7)	26.4 (79.5)	26.2 (79.2)	26.2 (79.2)	25.0 (77.0)	25.7 (78.3)	25.5 (77.9)	25.5 (77.9)	25.8 (78.4)	25.9 (78.7)
Mean daily minimum °C (°F)	22.3 (72.1)	22.2 (72.0)	22.4 (72.3)	22.6 (72.7)	22.6 (72.7)	22.4 (72.3)	22.4 (72.3)	22.3 (72.1)	22.2 (72.0)	22.2 (72.0)	22.1 (71.8)	22.3 (72.1)	22.3 (72.2)
Average rainfall mm (inches)	429 (16.9)	329 (13.0)	385 (15.2)	485 (19.1)	576 (22.7)	615 (24.2)	610 (24.0)	731 (28.8)	676 (26.6)	702 (27.6)	643 (25.3)	525 (20.7)	6,706 (264.1)
Source: Climate-Data.org
