= Medio San Juan =

Coordinates: 5.1°N 76.6833°W

- Municipality and town
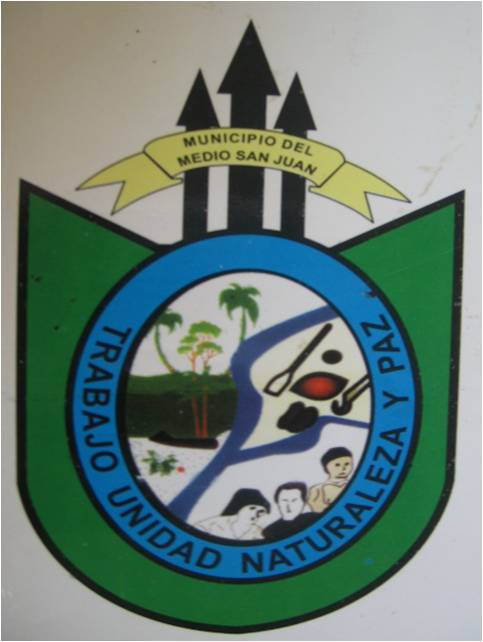
- Flag Coat of arms

- Location of the municipality and town of Medio Sanjuán in the Chocó Department of Colombia.
- Country: Colombia
- Department: Chocó Department

Area
  - Total: 620 km^{2} (240 sq mi)

Population (Census 2018)
  - Total: 9,073
  - Density: 15/km^{2} (38/sq mi)
- Time zone: UTC-5 (Colombia Standard Time)

Medio San Juan is a municipality and town in the Chocó Department, Colombia.

== Climate ==
Climate data for Medio San Juan (Noanama), elevation 40 m (130 ft), (1981–2010)
Month	Jan	Feb	Mar	Apr	May	Jun	Jul	Aug	Sep	Oct	Nov	Dec	Year
Mean daily maximum °C (°F)	29.5 (85.1)	29.9 (85.8)	30.1 (86.2)	30.1 (86.2)	30.2 (86.4)	29.9 (85.8)	29.9 (85.8)	29.9 (85.8)	29.8 (85.6)	29.3 (84.7)	29.3 (84.7)	29.3 (84.7)	29.8 (85.6)
Daily mean °C (°F)	26.0 (78.8)	26.2 (79.2)	26.3 (79.3)	26.4 (79.5)	26.3 (79.3)	26.1 (79.0)	26.1 (79.0)	26.0 (78.8)	25.9 (78.6)	25.8 (78.4)	25.8 (78.4)	25.8 (78.4)	26.0 (78.8)
Mean daily minimum °C (°F)	22.4 (72.3)	22.5 (72.5)	22.6 (72.7)	22.7 (72.9)	22.7 (72.9)	22.5 (72.5)	22.4 (72.3)	22.4 (72.3)	22.3 (72.1)	22.3 (72.1)	22.4 (72.3)	22.5 (72.5)	22.5 (72.5)
Average precipitation mm (inches)	453.9 (17.87)	367.4 (14.46)	415.3 (16.35)	498.7 (19.63)	535.5 (21.08)	511.6 (20.14)	592.0 (23.31)	668.1 (26.30)	600.5 (23.64)	568.5 (22.38)	528.5 (20.81)	514.2 (20.24)	6,199 (244.06)
Average precipitation days	25	21	23	25	26	26	28	28	26	27	26	25	302
Average relative humidity (%)	91	91	91	91	90	91	91	91	91	91	92	92	91
Mean monthly sunshine hours	71.3	76.2	74.4	81.0	89.9	84.0	105.4	99.2	75.0	74.4	75.0	71.3	977.1
Mean daily sunshine hours	2.3	2.7	2.4	2.7	2.9	2.8	3.4	3.2	2.5	2.4	2.5	2.3	2.7
Source: Instituto de Hidrologia Meteorologia y Estudios Ambientales
