= Medio Baudó =

Coordinates: 5.05°N 77.05°W

- Municipality and town
- Flag

- Location of the municipality and town of Medio Baudó in the Chocó Department of Colombia.
- Country: Colombia
- Department: Chocó Department

Population (Census 2018)
  - Total: 13,423
- Time zone: UTC-5 (Colombia Standard Time)

Medio Baudó (Spanish pronunciation: [ˈmeðjo βawˈðo]) is a municipality and town in the Chocó Department, Colombia.

== Climate ==
Medio Baudó has an extremely wet tropical rainforest climate (Af) with very heavy to extremely heavy rainfall year-round. The following climate data is for the town of Boca de Pepé, the capital of the municipality.

Climate data for Boca de Pepé
Month	Jan	Feb	Mar	Apr	May	Jun	Jul	Aug	Sep	Oct	Nov	Dec	Year
Mean daily maximum °C (°F)	30.1 (86.2)	30.2 (86.4)	30.7 (87.3)	30.7 (87.3)	30.7 (87.3)	30.4 (86.7)	30.5 (86.9)	30.2 (86.4)	30.1 (86.2)	29.6 (85.3)	29.5 (85.1)	29.7 (85.5)	30.2 (86.4)
Daily mean °C (°F)	26.2 (79.2)	26.2 (79.2)	26.6 (79.9)	26.7 (80.1)	26.6 (79.9)	26.4 (79.5)	26.4 (79.5)	26.2 (79.2)	26.2 (79.2)	25.9 (78.6)	25.9 (78.6)	26.0 (78.8)	26.3 (79.3)
Mean daily minimum °C (°F)	22.4 (72.3)	22.3 (72.1)	22.6 (72.7)	22.7 (72.9)	22.6 (72.7)	22.4 (72.3)	22.4 (72.3)	22.3 (72.1)	22.3 (72.1)	22.2 (72.0)	22.3 (72.1)	22.3 (72.1)	22.4 (72.3)
Average precipitation mm (inches)	501 (19.7)	413 (16.3)	451 (17.8)	551 (21.7)	596 (23.5)	630 (24.8)	626 (24.6)	785 (30.9)	708 (27.9)	710 (28.0)	649 (25.6)	548 (21.6)	7,168 (282.4)
Source: Climate-Data.org
