= Chocó Department =

Department of Colombia

Department of Chocó Departamento del Chocó (Spanish)
- Department
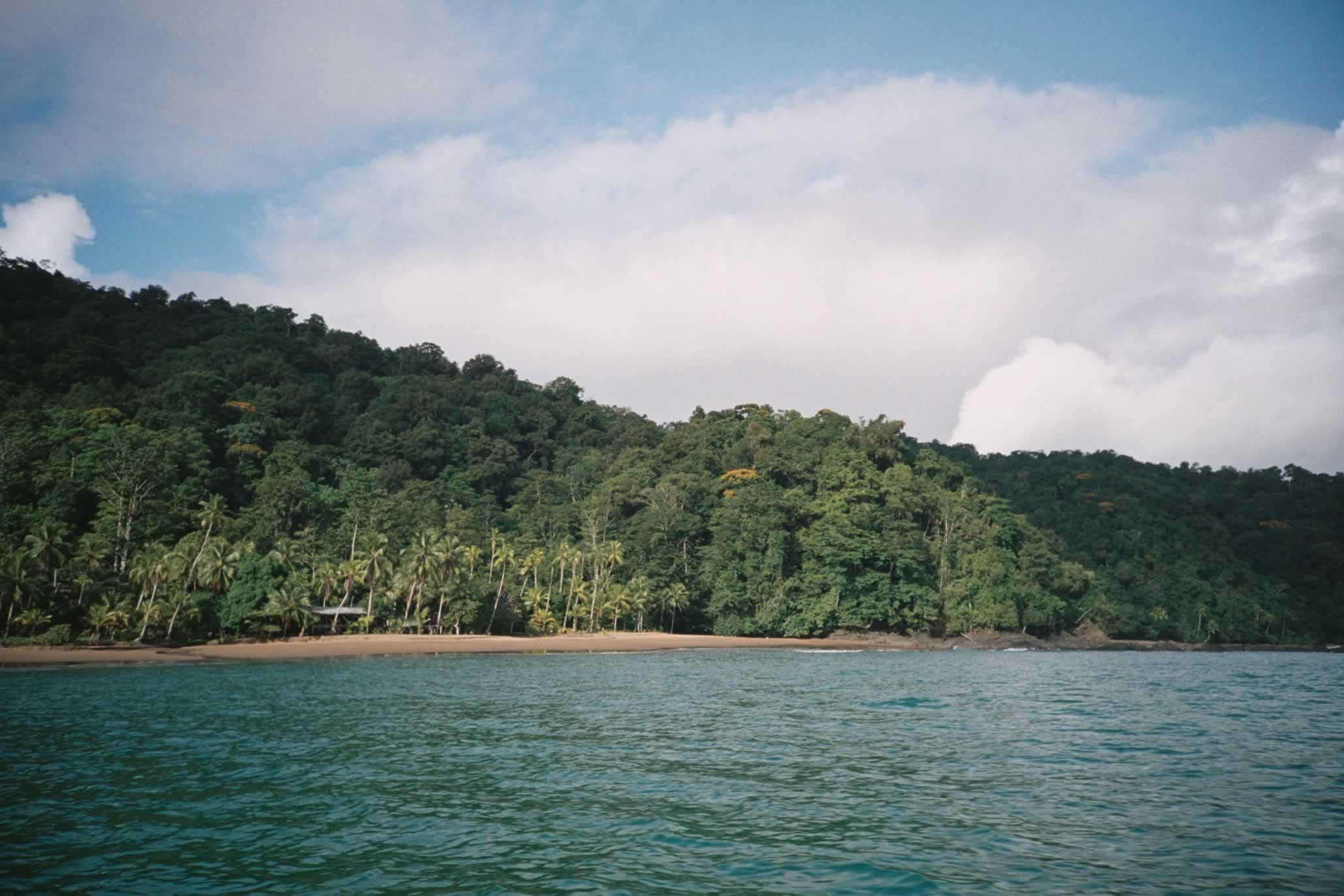
- Coasts of the Pacific Ocean in Chocó

- Flag Coat of arms

- Chocó shown in red

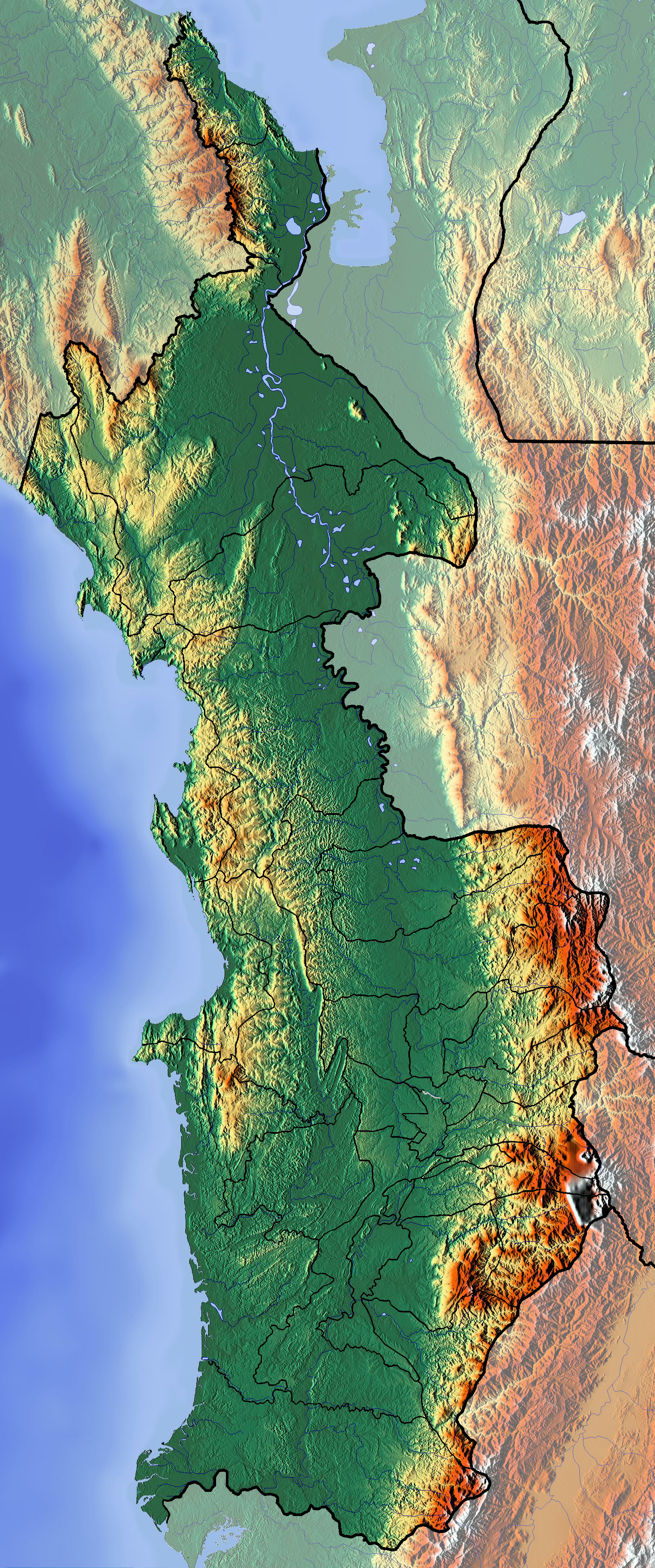
- Topography of the department
- Coordinates: 5°41′43″N 76°39′40″W
- Country: Colombia
- Region: Pacific/Chocó Region
- Established: 3 November 1947
- Capital: Quibdó

Government
  - Governor: Nubia Córdoba Curi (2024–2027)

Area
  - Total: 46,530 km^{2} (17,970 sq mi)
  - Rank: 9th

Population (2018)
  - Total: 534,826
  - Rank: 23rd
  - Density: 11.49/km^{2} (29.77/sq mi)

GDP
  - Total: COP 6,002 billion (US$1.4 billion)
- Time zone: UTC-05
- ISO 3166 code: CO-CHO
- Municipalities: 31
- HDI: 0.718 high · 31st of 33

Chocó Department (Spanish pronunciation: [tʃoˈko]) is a department of the Pacific region of Colombia, known for hosting the largest Afro-Colombian population in the nation, and a large population of Amerindian and mixed African-Amerindian Colombians. It is in the west of the country, and is the only Colombian department to have coastlines on both the Pacific Ocean and the Atlantic Ocean. It contains all of Colombia's border with Panama. Its capital is Quibdó.

Chocó has a diverse geography, unique ecosystems and unexploited natural resources; however, its population has one of the lowest standards of living of all departments in Colombia. A major factor cited by the government is the rugged, montane rainforest environment and the hot, hyperhumid climate. These factors have limited any significant infrastructure improvements to the region, and Chocó remains one of the most isolated regions of Colombia, with no major transportation infrastructure built since initial foundations were laid down in 1967 for a highway connecting Chocó with the city of Medellín.

The area has little access to medical care. In August 2016, Colombian media reported that some 50 children starved in less than three months, creating awareness of the grave condition Chocó's inhabitants are facing. That same year, an additional 10 adults and senior citizens, of the indigenous community in Chocó, died due to preventable causes such as malaria and diarrhea. In spite of the department's ranking of "world's rainiest lowland" (the Chocó–Darién moist forests ecoregion), with close to 10,000 millimetres (400 in) of annual precipitation, Quibdó lacks sanitary drinking water.

== History ==
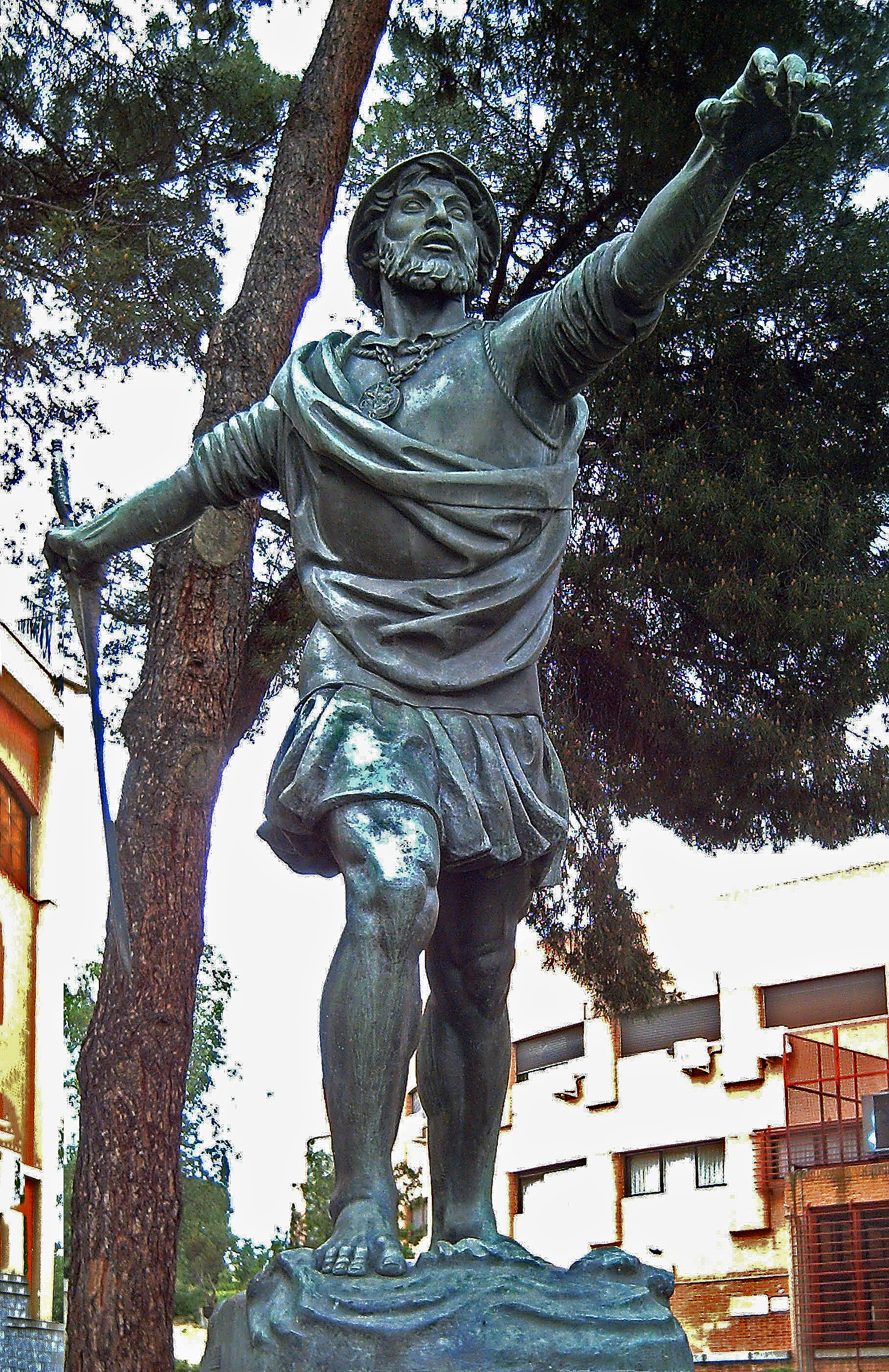
Monument to Vasco Núñez de Balboa in Madrid, founder of Santa María la Antigua del Darién

The first city founded by conquistadors in mainland America was Santa María la Antigua del Darién, founded by Vasco Núñez de Balboa in 1510 and disestablished in 1524, just 14 years later. The department was created in 1944. Its low population, mountainous and inhospitable topography, and distance from Bogotá resulted in Chocó receiving little attention from the Colombian government. During the reign of military dictator Gustavo Rojas Pinilla, his administration proposed to eliminate Chocó and divide its territory between the departments of Antioquia and Valle del Cauca. But the 1957 coup d'état of General Gabriel París Gordillo overthrew Pinilla's government and ended such plans.

== Geography ==
The Chocó Department makes up most of the ecoregion known as El Chocó that extends from Panama to Ecuador.

The municipality of Lloró holds the record for the world's highest average annual precipitation, measured at 13,300 millimetres (520 in; 43.6 ft) which makes it the wettest place in the world. Three large rivers drain the Chocó Department, the Atrato (which runs north, with tributaries that also flow north), the San Juan, and the Baudó. Each has many tributaries. The Baudó Mountains on the coast and the inland Cordillera Occidental are cut by low valleys, with an altitude less than 1,000 metres (3,300 ft), that form most of the territory. Most of the Chocó is thick rainforest. Much of the wood for Colombia's internal consumption is harvested from the Chocó, with a small percentage harvested for export. Chocó Department produces the majority of Colombia's significant platinum output (28,359 ounces of platinum in 2011). Chocó is also Colombia's top gold-producing region (653,625 ounces in 2011). In the late 19th century, it attracted a variety of miners from many countries seeking to make their fortunes in gold.

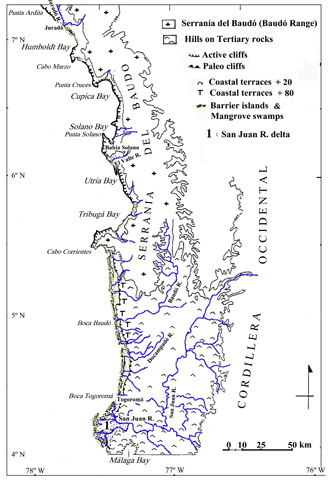
The Chocó Department is covered mostly by the Baudó Mountains.

Map of the Darién Gap and the break in the Pan-American Highway between Yaviza, Panama and Turbo, Colombia

=== Towns and municipalities ===
Quibdó is the largest city, with a population of almost 100,000. Other important cities and towns include Istmina, Condoto, Alto Baudó, Riosucio and El Carmen de Atrato in the interior, Acandí on the Caribbean Coast, and Bahía Solano on the Pacific Coast.

Resorts and Tourist destinations include Capurganá on the Caribbean Coast, and Juradó, Nuquí, and Solano Bay on the West Coast.

==== Municipalities ====
1. Acandí
2. Alto Baudó
3. Atrato
4. Bagadó
5. Bahía Solano
6. Bajo Baudó
7. Belén de Bajirá
8. Bojayá
9. Cértegui
10. Condoto
11. El Cantón de San Pablo
12. El Carmen de Atrato
13. El Carmen del Darién
14. Istmina
15. Juradó
16. Litoral del San Juan
17. Lloró
18. Medio Atrato
19. Medio Baudó
20. Medio San Juan
21. Nóvita
22. Nuquí
23. Quibdó
24. Río Iró
25. Río Quito
26. Riosucio
27. San José del Palmar
28. Sipí
29. Tadó
30. Unguía
31. Unión Panamericana

== Biodiversity ==
The Chocó is a Key Biodiversity Area (KBA). According to the United Nations Development Program, it contains the "greatest plant biodiversity on the planet (and) twenty-five percent of the plant and bird species living in this region are endemic." Globally, Chocó is among 25 regions classified as priority biodiversity hotspots.

Threats to this rich biodiversity, despite the region's conservation priority status, are many. Approximately 80% of the forest has been converted to other uses, such as slash-and-burn and intensive agriculture, inappropriate and illegal logging, and cattle ranching.

Measuring the extent of biodiversity loss in Chocó thus far was previously difficult due to the remoteness of most of the region. However, with advances in LiDAR imaging and the efforts of various nonprofit conservation organizations, there is much documentation to identify and quantify the environmental degradation and biodiversity loss.

For example, a 2019 analysis of more than 80,000 ha (200,000 acres) of LiDAR samples to quantify the vegetation structure, disturbance, and elevation in Chocó forests, a loss of more than 115 million tons of dry biomass, or 58 million tons of carbon was documented.

El Pangán ProAves Reserve, in the biogeographic region of Chocó, charged with protecting area's biodiversity, with special consideration of protecting bird species, is greatly challenged and not sufficiently equipped to meet the numerous conservation threats to a great diversity of fauna and flora that include 300 bird species. Forest degradation takes at least 50 years to regenerate, and regeneration efforts are not keeping pace with the rate of further deforestation. Soil erosion, negative effects on species' feeding and reproductive cycles, fragmentation of habitat, and loss of species are all consequences of this large-scale deforestation.

== Demographics ==
Historical population
Year	Pop.	±%
1973	203,635	—
1985	313,567	+54.0%
1993	406,199	+29.5%
2005	440,123	+8.4%
2018	534,826	+21.5%

The Chocó is inhabited predominantly by Afro-Colombians, descendants of enslaved Africans imported and brought to this area by the Spanish colonizers after colonizing the Americas. The second largest race/ethnic group are the Embera, a Native American people. More than half of their total population in Colombia lives in Chocó, some 35,500. They practice hunting and artisan fishing and live near rivers.

The total population as of 2005 was less than half a million, with more than half living in the Quibdó valley. According to a 2005 census the ethnic composition of the department is:

- Blacks, Mulattos and Zambos (82.1%)
- Amerindians or Indigenous (12.7%)
- Whites, Castizos and Mestizos (5.2%)

== See also ==
- Bojayá massacre
