= List of mining areas in Colombia =

Major mining areas in Colombia
Gold
La Colosa, Quinchía
Silver
Marmato
Nickel
Cerro Matoso
Platinum
Nóvita (TL)
Emeralds
Muzo, Chivor
Coal
Cerrejón, La Francia
Salt
Nemocón, Zipaquirá

This is a list of mining areas in Colombia. The mineral industry of Colombia is large and diverse; the country occupies the first place in mining areas per surface area in the world. In pre-Columbian times, mining of gold, silver, copper, emeralds, salt, coal and other minerals was already widespread. Precious metals as gold, and silver, platinum, nickel and coltan are located in different areas throughout the country. Colombia is the first producer of emeralds and as per February 2017 occupied a ninth position in the production of coal, produced in almost all of the departments of the country. Platinum is mostly found in the Western and Central Ranges of the Colombian Andes. Copper said to have been produced during colonial and later times apparently came from small shoots which may have been worked primarily for their gold content. The largest gold mine in Colombia is scheduled to start operations in Buriticá, Antioquia.

Frequently, there are conflicts between the potential mining activities and the indigenous communities in the country, especially in the eastern, sparsely populated departments of Vichada, Guanía, Guaviare and Vaupés.

== Maps ==
Mining areas in Colombia
Gold	Silver	Platinum	Emeralds	Coal	Salt
List of mining areas in Colombia is located in Colombia	List of mining areas in Colombia is located in Colombia	List of mining areas in Colombia is located in Colombia	List of mining areas in Colombia is located in Colombia	List of mining areas in Colombia is located in Colombia	List of mining areas in Colombia is located in Colombia
La Colosa, Quinchía; Other mining areas	Marmato; Other mining areas	Type locality Other mining areas	Western belt Eastern belt	Cerrejón, La Francia; Other mining areas	Sea salt Rock salt

== List ==
Legend
bold	Mineral type or first reported locality
italic	Prospect or potential mineral

Department	Municipality	Mining areas	Minerals	Image	Notes
Amazonas	La Pedrera		Gold		
Amazonas	Leticia		Gold, Silver		
Amazonas	Puerto Arica		Gold		
Amazonas	Puerto Santander		Silver		
Amazonas	Tarapacá		Coal		
Antioquia	Abejorral		Gold, Silver		
Antioquia	Abriaquí		Coal		
Antioquia	Alejandría		Coal		
Antioquia	Amagá	Amagá mine	Platinum, Coal, Siderite, formerly gold		
Antioquia	Amalfi	Chuchero, Clara, Clavellina, Lola, Vetilla	Gold, Silver, Platinum, Coal, Arsenopyrite, Pyrite, Quartz		
Antioquia	Andes		Gold, Silver, Platinum, Coal		
Antioquia	Angelópolis		Coal		
Antioquia	Angostura		Gold, Silver		
Antioquia	Anorí	Constancia	Gold, Silver, Coal, Arsenopyrite, Chalcopyrite, Pyrite, Quartz		
Antioquia	Anzá	Quiuná	Gold, Silver, Coal, Calcite, Quartz		
Antioquia	Apartadó		Gold, Silver		
Antioquia	Argelia		Gold, Silver		
Antioquia	El Bagre	La Ye	Gold, Silver, Platinum		
Antioquia	Barbosa		Gold, Silver, Coal		
Antioquia	Bello		Gold, Silver, Coal		
Antioquia	Belmira		Gold, Silver, Coal		
Antioquia	Betania		Gold, Silver		
Antioquia	Briceño		Gold, Silver, Coal		
Antioquia	Buriticá	Buriticá	Gold, Silver, Coal		
Antioquia	Cáceres		Gold, Silver, Platinum, Coal		
Antioquia	Caicedo		Gold, Silver		
Antioquia	Caldas		Gold, Silver, Coal		
Antioquia	Campamento		Gold, Silver		
Antioquia	Cañasgordas		Gold, Silver, Coal		
Antioquia	Caracolí		Gold, Silver, Coal		
Antioquia	Caramanta	Caramanta, Condé, San Cayetano, Zareimalito	Gold, Silver, Acanthite, Calcite, Chalcopyrite, 'Chlorite Group', Galena, Kermesite, Pyrargyrite, Pyrite, Quartz, Sphalerite, Stibnite, Tetrahedrite		
Antioquia	Carepa		Gold, Silver		
Antioquia	Carolina del Príncipe		Gold		
Antioquia	Caucasia		Gold, Silver, Platinum, Coal		
Antioquia	Chigorodó		Gold, Silver		
Antioquia	Cisneros	Cisneros	Gold, Silver, Coal		
Antioquia	Ciudad Bolívar		Gold		
Antioquia	Concepción		Gold, Silver, Coal		
Antioquia	Concordia		Gold, Silver, Coal		
Antioquia	Copacabana		Gold, Silver		
Antioquia	Dabeiba		Gold, Silver, Platinum, Coal		
Antioquia	Don Matías		Gold, Silver, Coal		
Antioquia	Ebéjico		Gold, Silver, Coal		
Antioquia	Entrerríos		Gold		
Antioquia	Envigado		Gold, Silver, Platinum		
Antioquia	Fredonia		Coal		
Antioquia	Frontino	Frontino mine, Pegadorcito-Pantanos Cu deposit	Gold, Silver, Platinum, Copper, Coal, Bornite, Calcite, Chalcocite, Chalcopyrite, Jarosite, Muscovite (var: Sericite), Pyrite, Pyrrhotite, Quartz		
Antioquia	Giraldo		Gold, Silver, Coal		
Antioquia	Girardota		Gold, Silver, Coal		
Antioquia	Gómez Plata		Gold, Silver, Coal		
Antioquia	Guadalupe		Gold, Silver, Coal		
Antioquia	Guarne		Gold		
Antioquia	Guatapé		Gold, Silver		
Antioquia	Heliconia		Gold, Silver		
Antioquia	Hispania		Gold		
Antioquia	Itagüí		Gold, Silver		
Antioquia	Ituango		Gold, Silver, Nickel		
Antioquia	Jardín		Gold, Silver		
Antioquia	Jericó	Quebradona	Gold		
Antioquia	La Ceja		Gold		
Antioquia	La Estrella		Gold, Silver		
Antioquia	La Pintada		Gold, Silver		
Antioquia	Liborina		Gold, Silver, Platinum, Coal		
Antioquia	Maceo		Gold, Silver, Platinum, Coal		
Antioquia	Marinilla		Gold, Silver		
Antioquia	Medellín	Morro Pelón	Gold, Silver, Platinum, Nickel, Coal		
Antioquia	Montebello		Gold		
Antioquia	Murindó	Murindó Cu-Au deposit	Calcite, Chalcopyrite, 'Chlorite Group', Epidote, Magnetite, Muscovite (var: Sericite), Pyrite		
Antioquia	Mutatá		Gold, Silver, Platinum, Coal		
Antioquia	Nariño		Gold, Silver, Coal		
Antioquia	Nechí		Gold, Silver, Platinum, Coal		
Antioquia	Necoclí		Gold, Silver		
Antioquia	Olaya		Gold		
Antioquia	El Peñol		Gold, Silver		
Antioquia	Puerto Berrío		Gold, Silver, Platinum, Coal		
Antioquia	Puerto Nare		Gold, Silver, Platinum		
Antioquia	Puerto Triunfo		Gold, Silver		
Antioquia	Remedios	Cecelia vein, Cogotes, Córdoba, Cristales, Estancón, Italia, Providencia, Pujidos, San Nicolas, Santa Isabel, Segovia-Remedios, Silencio, Sucre, Victoria	Gold, Silver, Platinum, Coal, Calcite, Galena, Hematite, 'Hornblende', 'Limonite', Pyrite, Quartz, Sphalerite		
Antioquia	Retiro		Gold, Silver, Coal		
Antioquia	Rionegro		Gold, Silver, Coal		
Antioquia	Río Chico	Río Chico Placer District	Gold, Almandine, Columbite-(Fe), Ferberite, Ilmenite, Kyanite, Monazite-(Ce), Rutile, Zircon		
Antioquia	Sabanalarga		Gold, Silver, Coal		
Antioquia	Salgar		Gold		
Antioquia	San Andrés de Cuerquia		Gold, Silver, Coal		
Antioquia	San Carlos		Gold, Silver, Coal		
Antioquia	San Francisco		Gold		
Antioquia	San Jerónimo		Silver		
Antioquia	San José de la Montaña		Gold, Silver		
Antioquia	San Luis		Gold, Silver		
Antioquia	San Pedro de los Milagros		Gold, Silver		
Antioquia	San Rafael		Gold, Silver		
Antioquia	San Roque	Gramalote	Gold, Silver, Platinum, Coal		
Antioquia	San Vicente		Gold, Silver		
Antioquia	Santa Bárbara		Gold, Silver, Platinum		
Antioquia	Santa Rosa de Osos	Juan Sánchez, San Antonio, San Miguel, San Ramón, Trinidad	Gold, Silver, Coal, 'Limonite', Pyrite, Quartz		
Antioquia	Santa Fe de Antioquia		Gold, Silver, Coal		
Antioquia	Santo Domingo		Gold, Silver, Coal		
Antioquia	Segovia	Segovia-Remedios	Gold, Silver, Platinum, Coal		
Antioquia	Sonsón		Gold, Silver, Platinum, Coal		
Antioquia	Sopetrán		Gold		
Antioquia	Támesis		Gold, Silver		
Antioquia	Tarazá		Gold, Silver, Platinum, Coal		
Antioquia	Titiribí	Cateador vein, Las Vetas, Otramina, Rose vein, Zancundo establishment; Chorros vein, El Zancudo, Rosario	Gold (var: Electrum), Silver, Platinum, Coal, 'Andorite', Aragonite, Arsenopyrite, Boulangerite, Bournonite, Calcite, Chalcopyrite, Diaphorite, Dolomite, Freibergite, Galena, Jamesonite, Miargyrite, Muscovite, Owyheeite, Pyrite, Pyrrhotite, Quartz, Siderite, Sphalerite, Stibnite, Tetrahedrite (var: Argentian Tetrahedrite)		
Antioquia	Toledo		Gold, Silver		
Antioquia	Turbo		Gold, Silver		
Antioquia	Uramita		Gold, Silver, Coal		
Antioquia	Urrao		Gold, Silver, Platinum, Coal		
Antioquia	Valdivia		Gold, Silver		
Antioquia	Valparaíso		Gold, Silver, Coal		
Antioquia	Vegachí		Gold, Silver, Platinum, Coal		
Antioquia	Venecia	La Mina	Gold, Coal		
Antioquia	Yalí		Gold, Silver, Coal		
Antioquia	Yarumal		Gold, Silver		
Antioquia	Yolombó		Gold, Silver, Coal		
Antioquia	Yondó		Gold, Silver		
Antioquia	Zaragoza	El Limón	Gold, Silver, Platinum, Coal		
Arauca	Arauca		Gold		
Atlántico	Barranquilla		Gold, Silver		
Bogotá Capital District	Bogotá	Chiwachi	Alunogen		
Bolívar	Altos del Rosario		Gold, Silver		
Bolívar	Arenal del Sur		Gold, Silver		
Bolívar	Barranco de Loba		Gold, Silver, Coal		
Bolívar	Cartagena		Gold, Silver		
Bolívar	El Peñón		Gold, Silver, Coal		
Bolívar	Hatillo de Loba		Gold, Silver		
Bolívar	Magangué		Gold, Silver		
Bolívar	Margarita		Gold, Silver		
Bolívar	Mompós		Gold, Silver		
Bolívar	Montecristo		Gold, Silver		
Bolívar	Morales		Gold, Silver		
Bolívar	Norosí		Gold, Silver		
Bolívar	Río Viejo		Gold, Silver, Coal		
Bolívar	San Fernando		Gold, Silver		
Bolívar	San Jacinto del Cauca		Gold, Silver		
Bolívar	San Martín de Loba		Gold, Silver		
Bolívar	San Pablo		Gold, Silver, Coal		
Bolívar	Santa Catalina		Salt		
Bolívar	Santa Rosa		Gold, Silver		
Bolívar	Santa Rosa del Sur	Guamocó	Gold, Silver, Platinum, Coal		
Bolívar	Simití		Gold, Silver, Platinum, Coal		
Bolívar	Tiquisio		Gold, Silver, Platinum, Coal		
Boyacá	Aquitania		Coal		
Boyacá	Betéitiva		Coal		
Boyacá	Boavita		Coal		
Boyacá	Boyacá		Coal		
Boyacá	Buenavista		Coal		
Boyacá	Chita		Coal		
Boyacá	Chivatá		Coal		
Boyacá	Chivor	Chivor, Gualí, Palo Aranado	Beryl (var: Emerald), Albite, Allophane, Ankerite, 'Apatite', Calcite, Dolomite, Euclase, Fluorite, Goethite, 'Halloysite', Hematite, Kaolinite, 'Limonite', Muscovite (var: Sericite), Opal (var: Opal-AN), 'Parisite', Pyrite, Quartz		
Boyacá	Cómbita		Coal		
Boyacá	Corrales		Coal		
Boyacá	Cucaita		Coal		
Boyacá	Duitama		Coal		
Boyacá	El Espino	Natagaymas, Guaduas Fm.	Coal		
Boyacá	Floresta		Coal		
Boyacá	Gámeza		Coal		
Boyacá	Guacamayas		Coal		
Boyacá	Iza		Coal		
Boyacá	Jenesano		Coal		
Boyacá	Jericó		Coal		
Boyacá	La Uvita		Coal		
Boyacá	Macanal	Agua Blanca Mine	Beryl (var: Emerald), Calcite, Dolomite, Fluorite, Quartz		
Boyacá	Maripí	Cunas mine, La Pita, Polveros	Beryl (var: Emerald), Calcite, Pyrite		
Boyacá	Mongua		Coal		
Boyacá	Monguí	Guaduas Fm.	Coal		
Boyacá	Motavita		Coal		
Boyacá	Muzo	Cincho Mine, La Polvorosa Mine, Muzo, Las Pavas, Quipama mines, Tequendama mine	Beryl (var: Emerald, var:Trapiche emerald), Albite, Allophane, Ankerite, 'Apatite', Baryte, Beryl, Boracite, Calcite, Chalcopyrite, Dolomite, Fluorite, Gypsum, Halite, Marcasite, Muscovite (var: Fuchsite), 'Parisite', Parisite-(Ce) (TL), Pyrite, Pyrophyllite, Quartz, Sulphur		
Boyacá	Nobsa		Coal		
Boyacá	Nuevo Colón		Coal		
Boyacá	Otanche	La Glorieta, Yacopí Mine	Beryl (var: Emerald), Calcite, Dolomite, Fluorite, Quartz		
Boyacá	Paipa		Coal		
Boyacá	Panqueba		Coal		
Boyacá	Pauna	La Marina Mine	Emerald, Albite, Euclase, Fluorapatite		
Boyacá	Paz de Río		Coal		
Boyacá	Pesca		Coal		
Boyacá	Puerto Boyacá		Gold		
Boyacá	Ráquira	La Peña mine, Piedro mine, Bocatoma mine (Guaduas Fm.)	Coal		
Boyacá	Saboyá		Coal		
Boyacá	Samacá		Coal		
Boyacá	San Mateo		Coal		
Boyacá	San Pablo de Borbur	Coscuez, Peñas Blancas	Beryl (var: Emerald), Baryte, Calcite, Fluorite, Pyrite, Quartz		
Boyacá	Santa María		Coal		
Boyacá	Santa Rosa de Viterbo		'Viterbite'		
Boyacá	Sativanorte		Coal		
Boyacá	Sativasur		Coal		
Boyacá	Socha		Coal		
Boyacá	Socotá		Coal		
Boyacá	Sogamoso		Gold, Coal		
Boyacá	Somondoco		Emerald		
Boyacá	Susacón		Coal		
Boyacá	Tasco		Coal		
Boyacá	Tibaná		Coal		
Boyacá	Tibasosa		Coal		
Boyacá	Tópaga		Coal		
Boyacá	Tota		Coal		
Boyacá	Tunja		Coal		
Boyacá	Turmequé		Coal		
Boyacá	Tuta		Coal		
Boyacá	Úmbita		Coal		
Boyacá	Ventaquemada		Coal		
Caldas	Loazia Hill	Chaburquia, Echandia District, La Plata vein, Loaizita Lode, San Antonio vein	Gold, Silver, Acanthite, Calcite, Chalcopyrite, Galena, Pyrite, Quartz, Sphalerite		
Caldas	Aguadas		Gold, Silver		
Caldas	Anserma		Gold, Silver		
Caldas	Chinchiná		Gold, Silver		
Caldas	Filadelfia		Gold, Silver, Coal		
Caldas	La Dorada		Gold, Silver, Coal		
Caldas	La Merced		Gold, Silver		
Caldas	Manizales		Gold, Silver, Platinum, Coal, Pyrite, Quartz, Stibnite		
Caldas	Manzanares		Gold, Silver		
Caldas	Marmato	Marmato	Gold, Silver, Platinum, Coal		
Caldas	Neira		Gold, Silver		
Caldas	Norcasia		Gold, Silver		
Caldas	Pácora	Bureo	Gold, Calcite, Pyrargyrite, Pyrite		
Caldas	Palestina		Gold, Silver		
Caldas	Pensilvania		Gold, Silver		
Caldas	Riosucio		Gold, Silver, Platinum		
Caldas	Risaralda		Gold		
Caldas	Salamina	Marmato Mining District	Gold (var: Electrum), Acanthite, Albite (var: Andesine (FRL)), Arsenopyrite, Calcite, Chalcopyrite, 'Chlorite Group', Epidote, Galena, Hematite (var: Martite), Kaolinite, Marcasite, Muscovite (var: Sericite), Pyrite, Pyrrhotite, Quartz, Sphalerite		
Caldas	Samaná		Gold, Silver		
Caldas	Supía	Contento, Diamante, La Pava, Morisco, Pinares, Tolda Fría, Volcanes	Gold, Silver, Coal, Calcite, Diaphorite, Freibergite, Galena, Pyrargyrite, Pyrite, Pyrrhotite, Quartz, Sphalerite, Stephanite, Tetrahedrite		
Caldas	Victoria		Gold, Silver, Coal		
Caldas	Villamaría		Gold, Silver, Coal		
Caquetá	Albania		Gold, Coal		
Caquetá	Florencia		Gold		
Caquetá	Puerto Rico		Gold		
Caquetá	San José del Fragua		Gold		
Caquetá	Solano		Gold, Silver, Coal		
Casanare	Recetor		Coal		
Cauca	Argelia		Gold, Coal		
Cauca	Bolívar		Gold, Silver, Platinum, Coal		
Cauca	Buenos Aires	Asnazu	Gold, Platinum		
Cauca	Caldono		Gold, Coal		
Cauca	Caloto		Gold		
Cauca	El Tambo		Gold, Silver, Platinum, Coal		
Cauca	Guachené		Gold		
Cauca	Guapi	Río Pilpe	Gold, Silver, Platinum, Chromite, Erlichmanite, Iridium, Laurite, Magnetite, Osmium, Rutheniridosmine, Ruthenium		
Cauca	Inzá		Gold		
Cauca	La Sierra		Gold, Silver, Platinum, Coal		
Cauca	La Vega		Gold, Silver		
Cauca	López de Micay		Gold, Silver, Platinum, Coal		
Cauca	Mercaderes	Rio Mayo	Corundum (var: Ruby, var: Sapphire), Almandine, Anthophyllite, Augite, Fluorapatite, Grossular, Hematite, 'Hornblende', Ilmenite, Kornerupine, Magnetite, 'Olivine', Pyrope, Rutile, Titanite, Zircon		
Cauca	Morales		Coal		
Cauca	Patía	Piedrasentada Cu deposit	Gold, Silver, Coal, Calcite, Chalcopyrite, 'Chlorite Group', Epidote, Pyrite		
Cauca	Popayán		Gold, Silver, Coal		
Cauca	Puerto Tejada		Gold, Silver		
Cauca	Santa Rosa		Gold, Silver, Coal		
Cauca	Santander de Quilichao		Gold, Silver, Platinum, Coal		
Cauca	Suárez		Gold, Silver, Platinum, Coal		
Cauca	Timbiquí		Gold, Silver, Platinum, Coal		
Cauca	Toribío		Gold		
Cesar	Agustín Codazzi		Coal		
Cesar	Becerril		Coal		
Cesar	Chiriguaná		Coal		
Cesar	El Paso	La Francia	Coal		
Cesar	La Jagua de Ibirico		Coal		
Cesar	Valledupar		Gold		
Chocó	Acandí	Acandí Cu deposit	Gold, Silver, Platinum, Coal, Albite, Calcite, Chalcopyrite, 'Chlorite Group', Epidote, Muscovite (var: Sericite), Pyrite		
Chocó	Alto Baudó		Gold, Silver, Platinum		
Chocó	Atrato		Gold, Silver, Platinum, Coal		
Chocó	Bagadó		Gold, Silver, Platinum, Coal		
Chocó	Bahía Solano		Gold		
Chocó	Bajo Baudó		Gold, Silver, Coal		
Chocó	Bojayá		Gold, Silver, Platinum		
Chocó	Cértegui		Gold, Silver, Platinum, Coal		
Chocó	Condoto	Alto Condoto intrusion	Gold, Silver, Platinum, Coal, Isoferroplatinum, 'Albite-Anorthite Series', Bowieite, Chromite, 'Clinopyroxene Subgroup', Cooperite, Cuprorhodsite, Erlichmanite, 'Hornblende', Laurite, Magnetite, 'Olivine', Pargasite, Phlogopite, Tulameenite		
Chocó	El Cantón de San Pablo		Gold, Silver, Platinum, Coal		
Chocó	El Carmen de Atrato	El Roble	Gold, Silver, Platinum, Copper, Coal		
Chocó	Litoral del San Juan		Gold		
Chocó	Istmina		Gold, Silver, Platinum, Coal		
Chocó	Lloró		Gold, Silver, Platinum, Coal		
Chocó	Medio Atrato		Gold, Silver, Platinum		
Chocó	Medio Baudó		Gold, Silver, Platinum, Coal		
Chocó	Medio San Juan		Gold, Silver, Platinum, Coal		
Chocó	Nóvita	San Juan Basin, Pinto River, Tamaña River	Gold, Silver, Platinum (TL), Coal, Sorosite, Stistaite, Tin		
Chocó	Quibdó		Gold, Silver, Platinum, Coal		
Chocó	Río Iró		Gold, Silver, Platinum, Coal		
Chocó	Río Quito		Gold, Silver, Platinum, Coal		
Chocó	Riosucio	Atrato River	Gold, Silver, Platinum, Iridium (var: Ruthenosmiridium)		
Chocó	San José del Palmar		Gold, Silver, Platinum, Coal		
Chocó	Sipí		Gold, Silver, Platinum, Coal		
Chocó	Tadó		Gold, Silver, Platinum, Coal		
Chocó	Unguía		Gold, Silver, Platinum, Coal		
Chocó	Unión Panamericana		Gold, Silver, Platinum, Coal		
Córdoba	Ayapel		Gold, Silver, Platinum		
Córdoba	Buenavista		Gold, Silver, Platinum, Coal		
Córdoba	La Apartada		Gold, Silver, Coal		
Córdoba	Montelíbano	Cerro Matoso S. A. Laterite deposit (Cerro Matoso mine)	Gold, Silver, Platinum, Coal, Chamosite, 'Chlorite Group', Forsterite, 'Garnierite', Gibbsite, Goethite, Kaolinite, 'Limonite', Maghemite, Magnetite, 'Pimelite', Quartz (var: Chalcedony), Sepiolite, 'Serpentine Subgroup', Siderite, 'Smectite Group', Talc		
Córdoba	Montería		Gold, Silver		
Córdoba	Planeta Rica		Gold, Silver, Platinum, Nickel, Coal		
Córdoba	Pueblo Nuevo		Gold, Silver, Coal		
Córdoba	Puerto Libertador		Gold, Silver, Coal		
Córdoba	Sahagún		Gold, Silver		
Córdoba	San Antero		Gold, Silver		
Córdoba	San Carlos		Gold, Silver		
Córdoba	San José de Uré		Gold, Silver, Nickel		
Cundinamarca	Caparrapí		Coal		
Cundinamarca	Choachí		Gold		
Cundinamarca	Cogua		Coal		
Cundinamarca	Cucunubá		Coal		
Cundinamarca	Gachalá	Matacana Mine	Beryl (var: Emerald), Euclase		
Cundinamarca	Girardot		Gold		
Cundinamarca	Guachetá	La Mana, Laberinto	Coal		
Cundinamarca	Guatavita		Coal		
Cundinamarca	Jerusalén		Coal		
Cundinamarca	Lenguazaque		Coal		
Cundinamarca	Machetá		Coal		
Cundinamarca	Nemocón	Nemocón salt mine	Salt, Coal		
Cundinamarca	Nilo		Coal		
Cundinamarca	Pacho		Gold, Coal		
Cundinamarca	Quipile		Coal		
Cundinamarca	San Cayetano		Coal		
Cundinamarca	Sesquilé		Salt		
Cundinamarca	Subachoque		Coal		
Cundinamarca	Suesca		Coal		
Cundinamarca	Supatá	Quartz occurrence	Quartz		
Cundinamarca	Sutatausa		Coal		
Cundinamarca	Tabio		Coal		
Cundinamarca	Tausa		Coal		
Cundinamarca	Tocaima		Coal		
Cundinamarca	Venecia		Coal		
Cundinamarca	Ubaté		Coal		
Cundinamarca	Villapinzón		Coal		
Cundinamarca	Ubalá	Buenavista Mines	Beryl (var: Emerald)		
Cundinamarca	Zipaquirá	Zipaquirá salt mine	Salt, Pyrite		
Guainía	Inírida		Gold, Silver, Platinum, Coal, Coltan, Uranium		
Guaviare	San José del Guaviare		Gold, Platinum, Iron, Albite, 'Albite-Anorthite Series', Andradite (var: Melanite), 'Apatite', Arfvedsonite, 'Biotite', Calcite, Cancrinite, Epidote, Fluorite, 'Garnet', Microcline, 'Monazite', Nepheline, Siderite, Titanite, Zircon		
Huila	Agrado		Gold, Silver		
Huila	Aipe	Organos	Gold, Silver, Coal, Galena, 'Limonite', Pyrite, 'Wad'		
Huila	Gigante		Gold		
Huila	Iquira		Gold, Silver, Coal		
Huila	Neiva		Gold, Silver, Coal		
Huila	Palermo		Gold, Silver, Coal		
Huila	Pitalito		Gold, Silver		
Huila	Tarqui		Gold		
Huila	Tesalia		Gold, Silver		
Huila	Yaguará		Gold		
La Guajira	Albania		Coal		
La Guajira	Barrancas	El Cerrejón Mine, Cerrejón Centro Mines, Cerrejón Sur Mines, Cerrejón Zona Norte Mines, Oreganal	Coal		
La Guajira	Hatonuevo		Coal		
La Guajira	Manaure		Salt		
La Guajira	Riohacha		Gold		
La Guajira	Uribia	Parash	Actinolite, Albite, Almandine, 'Biotite', Calcite, 'Chlorite Group', Clinozoisite, Epidote, Fluorapatite, Glaucophane, Hematite, 'Hornblende', Jadeite, Muscovite (var: Sericite), Omphacite, Paragonite, Pyrite, Quartz, Rutile, 'Scapolite', Titanite		
Magdalena	Aracataca		Gold		
Magdalena	Ciénaga		Gold, Silver		
Magdalena	El Banco		Gold		
Magdalena	Fundación		Gold		
Magdalena	Santa Marta		Gold, Silver		
Meta	Puerto Rico		Gold		
Meta	Restrepo	Upín salt mine	Salt		
Nariño	Barbacoas		Gold, Silver, Platinum, Coal		
Nariño	Buesaco		Gold, Silver, Coal		
Nariño	Colón		Gold, Coal		
Nariño	Cumbal		Gold		
Nariño	Cumbitara		Gold, Silver, Platinum		
Nariño	El Charco		Gold, Silver, Platinum		
Nariño	Ipiales		Gold, Coal		
Nariño	La Llanada		Gold, Silver, Coal		
Nariño	Los Andes		Gold, Silver, Coal		
Nariño	Magüí Payán		Gold, Silver, Platinum, Coal		
Nariño	Mallama	Gualcala, Porvenir	Gold, Silver, Acanthite, Arsenopyrite, Chalcopyrite, Galena, Pyrite, Sphalerite		
Nariño	Mosquera		Gold		
Nariño	Pasto		Gold, Silver		
Nariño	Policarpa		Gold, Silver, Coal		
Nariño	Roberto Payán		Gold, Silver, Platinum		
Nariño	Samaniego	Concordia, Mandrono, Socorro	Gold, Silver, Coal, Arsenopyrite, Quartz		
Nariño	San Bernardo	Tambo	Gold, Pyrite, Quartz		
Nariño	San Pablo		Gold, Silver, Coal		
Nariño	Santa Bárbara		Gold, Silver, Platinum, Coal		
Nariño	Santacruz		Gold, Silver, Coal		
Nariño	Tumaco		Gold, Silver, Platinum, Coal		
Norte de Santander	Arboledas		Coal		
Norte de Santander	Bochalema		Coal		
Norte de Santander	Cácota		Coal		
Norte de Santander	Chinácota		Coal		
Norte de Santander	Chitagá		Coal		
Norte de Santander	Cúcuta		Gold, Coal		
Norte de Santander	Durania		Coal		
Norte de Santander	El Zulia		Coal		
Norte de Santander	Herrán		Coal		
Norte de Santander	Labateca		Coal		
Norte de Santander	Los Patios		Gold, Coal		
Norte de Santander	Mutiscua		Coal		
Norte de Santander	Pamplona	Alta Group, Baja Group, Pie de Gallo, Vetas Group	Gold, Silver, Coal, Acanthite, Aragonite, Azurite, Chalcopyrite, Enargite, Freibergite, Galena, Malachite, Pyrite, Pyrrhotite, Quartz, Sphalerite		
Norte de Santander	Pamplonita		Coal, Phosphuranylite		
Norte de Santander	Salazar de las Palmas		Coal		
Norte de Santander	San Cayetano		Coal		
Norte de Santander	Santiago		Coal		
Norte de Santander	Sardinata		Coal		
Norte de Santander	Tibú		Coal		
Norte de Santander	Toledo		Coal		
Norte de Santander	Villa del Rosario		Gold, Coal		
Putumayo	Colón		Gold, Silver, Coal		
Putumayo	Mocoa	Mocoa Cu-Mo deposit	Gold, Silver, Coal, Actinolite, Anhydrite, 'Apatite', Baryte, 'Biotite', Bornite, Calcite, Chalcanthite, Chalcocite, Chalcopyrite, 'Chlorite Group', Covellite, Diopside, Epidote, Galena, 'Garnet', Goethite, Gypsum, Hedenbergite, Hematite (var: Specularite), 'Hornblende', Jarosite, Kaolinite, 'Limonite', Magnetite, Malachite, Molybdenite, Muscovite (var: Sericite), Phlogopite, Prehnite, Pyrite, Quartz, Sphalerite, Tetrahedrite, Wollastonite, 'Zeolite Group'		
Putumayo	Orito		Gold, Silver		
Putumayo	Puerto Caicedo		Gold, Silver		
Putumayo	Puerto Guzmán		Gold, Silver		
Putumayo	Puerto Leguízamo		Gold, Silver		
Putumayo	Sibundoy		Gold, Silver, Coal		
Putumayo	Valle del Guamuez		Gold, Silver		
Putumayo	Villagarzón		Gold, Silver, Coal		
Quindío			Cinnabar, 'Tektite'		
Quindío	Armenia		Gold, Silver, Platinum		
Quindío	Buenavista		Gold, Silver		
Quindío	Génova		Gold		
Quindío	La Tebaida		Gold, Silver		
Quindío	Pijao		Gold		
Quindío	Quimbaya		Gold, Silver		
Quindío	Salento		Gold, Silver		
Risaralda	Apía		Gold, Silver		
Risaralda	Belén de Umbría		Gold, Silver, Platinum		
Risaralda	Guática		Gold, Silver		
Risaralda	Marsella		Gold, Silver		
Risaralda	Mistrató		Gold, Silver, Coal		
Risaralda	Pereira		Gold, Silver, Platinum, Coal		
Risaralda	Pueblo Rico		Gold, Silver		
Risaralda	Quinchía	Quinchía mine, Surbia	Gold, Silver, Platinum, Copper, Coal, Molybdenum, Zinc		
Risaralda	Santa Rosa de Cabal		Gold, Silver, Platinum, Coal		
San Andrés y Providencia					
Santander	Albania		Gold, Coal		
Santander	Barbosa		Gold, Silver, Coal		
Santander	Barrancabermeja		Gold		
Santander	Bucaramanga		Gold, Silver, Coal		
Santander	California	California Cu-Au deposit	Gold, Silver, Platinum, Coal, Alunite, Chalcopyrite, 'Chlorite Group', Kaolinite, Muscovite (var: Sericite), Pyrite, Pyrophyllite		
Santander	Capitanejo		Gold, Coal		
Santander	El Carmen de Chucurí		Gold, Coal		
Santander	Enciso		Gold, Coal		
Santander	Guavatá		Gold, Coal		
Santander	Landázuri		Gold, Coal		
Santander	Lebrija		Silver		
Santander	Rionegro		Silver		
Santander	San Gil		Gold		
Santander	San José de Miranda		Gold, Coal		
Santander	San Miguel		Gold, Coal		
Santander	Suaita	San Cristobal pegmatite	Dewindtite, Meta-autunite, Quartz, Uranophane-β		
Santander	Vetas		Gold, Silver, Coal		
Sucre	Sampués		Gold, Silver, Platinum		
Sucre	San Marcos		Gold, Coal		
Sucre	Sincelejo		Gold, Coal		
Sucre		Sonrisa mine	Arsenopyrite, Quartz		
Tolima	China River District	Boyala lode, San Sebastian lode, Santander lode	Galena, 'Limonite', Pyrargyrite, Pyrite, Quartz, Sphalerite		
Tolima	Santana District		Silver, Acanthite, Arsenopyrite, Calcite, Galena, Graphite, Pyrargyrite, Pyrite, Quartz, Siderite, Sphalerite		
Tolima	Soledad District		Gold, Galena, Pyrite, Quartz, Stibnite		
Tolima	Alpujarra	Dolores prospect	Albite, Calcite, Chalcopyrite, 'Chlorite Group', Epidote, Magnetite, Pyrite		
Tolima	Armero		Gold		
Tolima	Ataco		Gold, Silver, Platinum, Coal		
Tolima	Cajamarca	La Colosa mine, Bolívar mine, Natagamia, Redreo	Gold, Silver, Copper, Arsenopyrite, Calcite, Cinnabar, Pyrite, Tetrahedrite		
Tolima	Casabianca		Gold, Silver		
Tolima	Chaparral		Gold, Silver, Coal		
Tolima	Coello		Gold, Silver		
Tolima	Coyaima		Gold, Silver, Coal		
Tolima	Falan		Gold, Silver		
Tolima	Fresno		Gold, Silver		
Tolima	Ibagué	Floresta, Gallo, Payandé, San Cayetano, Triumfo	Gold, Silver, Coal, Galena, Pyrite, Quartz, Sphalerite, Tetrahedrite		
Tolima	Lérida		Gold, Silver		
Tolima	Líbano	Esperanza vein, La Plata del Líbano	Gold, Silver, Coal, Chalcopyrite, Galena, Pyrite, Quartz, Sphalerite		
Tolima	Mariquita	Bocaneme, Plata-Vieja	Gold, Silver		
Tolima	Ortega		Gold, Silver		
Tolima	Palocabildo		Gold, Silver		
Tolima	Roncesvalles		Gold, Silver, Coal		
Tolima	San Luis		Gold		
Tolima	Santa Isabel		Gold, Silver, Coal		
Tolima	Valle de San Juan		Gold, Silver		
Tolima	Venadillo	Palmillo, Calamonte, Frías, Tulcán	Gold, Silver, Galena, Pyrite, Quartz		
Valle del Cauca	Argelia		Gold		
Valle del Cauca	Bolívar		Gold, Platinum		
Valle del Cauca	Buenaventura		Gold, Silver, Platinum, Coal		
Valle del Cauca	Buga		Gold, Coal		
Valle del Cauca	Cali	Cali meteorite	Gold, Silver, Platinum, Copper, Coal, 'Albite-Anorthite Series', Chromite, 'Clinopyroxene Subgroup', 'Glass', Iron (var: Kamacite), 'Olivine', 'Pyroxene Group', Taenite, Troilite		
Valle del Cauca	Calima		Gold		
Valle del Cauca	Candelaria		Gold		
Valle del Cauca	Cartago		Gold, Silver		
Valle del Cauca	Dagua		Gold		
Valle del Cauca	El Cerrito	Palmichala	Gold		
Valle del Cauca	El Dovio		Gold, Silver, Coal		
Valle del Cauca	Ginebra		Gold, Silver, Coal		
Valle del Cauca	Guacarí		Gold, Silver, Coal		
Valle del Cauca	Jamundí		Gold, Coal		
Valle del Cauca	La Unión		Gold		
Valle del Cauca	Malpelo Island		Metavariscite, Phosphosiderite, Variscite (var: Ferrian Variscite)		
Valle del Cauca	Palmira		Gold, Platinum, Coal		
Valle del Cauca	Restrepo		Gold		
Valle del Cauca	Sevilla		Gold		
Valle del Cauca	Tuluá		Gold, Silver		
Valle del Cauca	Yumbo		Gold, Coal		
Vaupés	Mitú		Gold, Coltan, Coal		
Vaupés	Taraira		Gold, Silver, Coal		
Vichada			Coltan		
Vichada	Cumaribo		Gold		
Vichada	La Primavera		Gold		
Vichada	Puerto Carreño		Gold		

== See also ==
- List of fossiliferous stratigraphic units in Colombia
- Mineral industry of Colombia
- Colombian emeralds
- List of mines in South Africa
