= Mineral industry of Colombia =

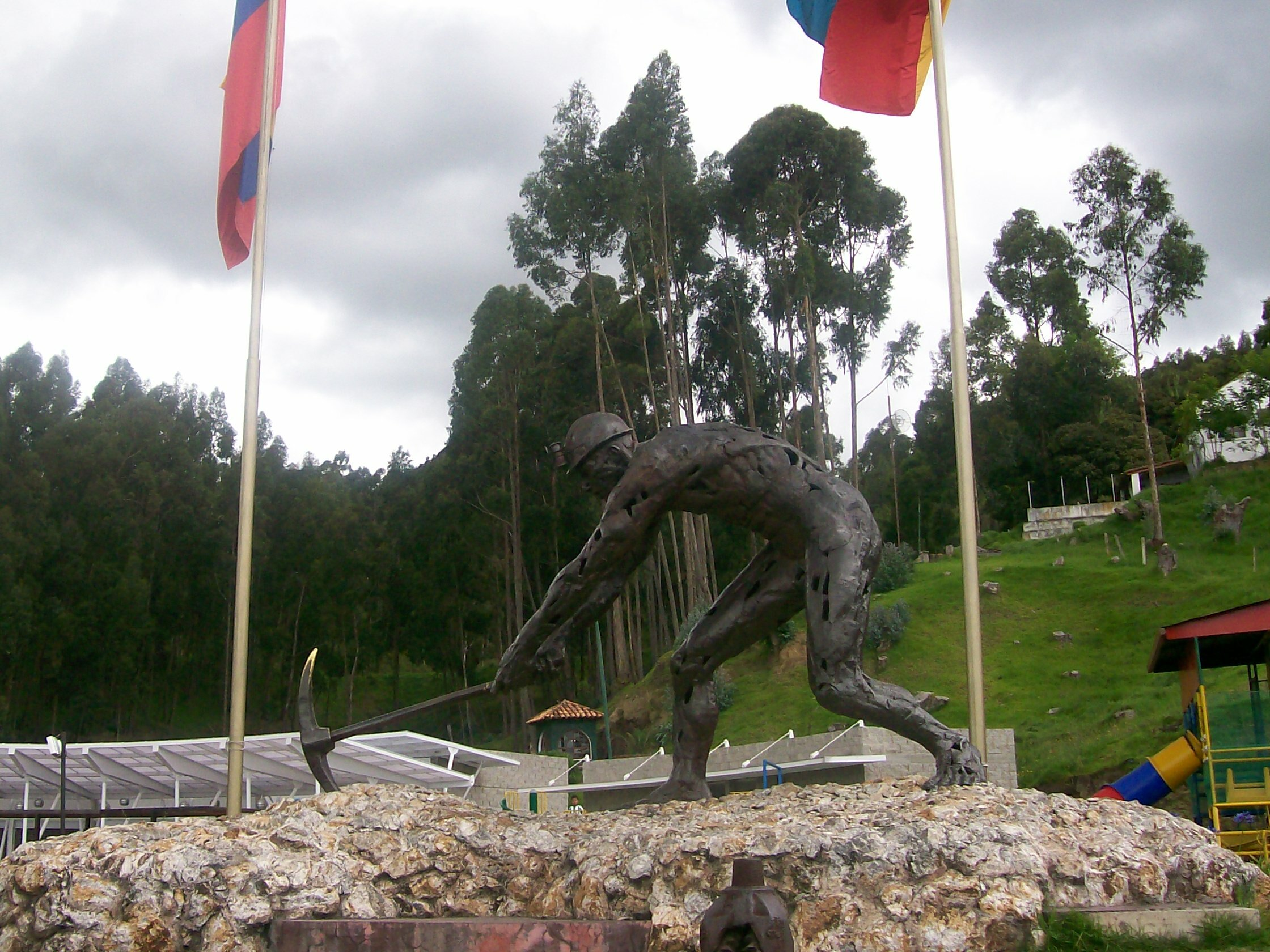
Monument to the miners in Zipaquirá, Cundinamarca

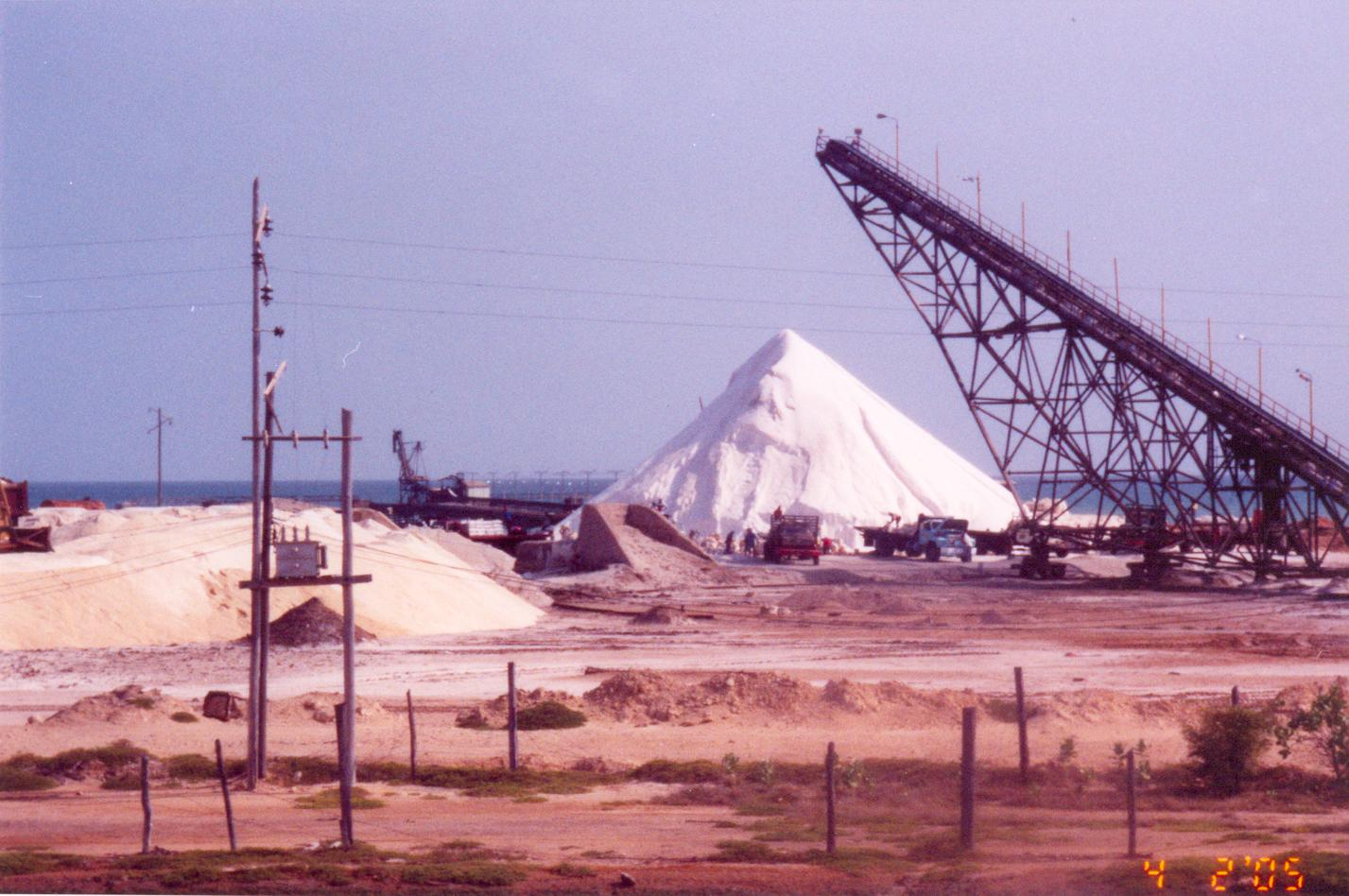
Sea salt exploitation in Manaure

Mineral industry of Colombia refers to the extraction of valuable minerals or other geological materials in Colombia. Colombia is well-endowed with minerals and energy resources. It has the largest coal reserves in Latin America, and is second to Brazil in hydroelectric potential. Estimates of petroleum reserves in 1995 were 3.1 billion barrels (490,000,000 m^{3}). Colombia also possesses significant amounts of nickel and gold. Other important metals included platinum and silver, which were extracted in much smaller quantities. Colombia also produces copper, small amounts of iron ore, and bauxite. Nonmetallic mined minerals include salt, limestone, sulfur, gypsum, dolomite, barite, feldspar, clay, magnetite, mica, talcum, and marble. Colombia also produces most of the world's emeralds. Despite the variety of minerals available for exploitation, Colombia still had to import substances such as iron, copper, and aluminum to meet its industrial needs.

Materials recovered by mining in the country include oil, with proved reserves of 1,506,000,000 bbl (239,400,000 m^{3}) (2006 estimate) and natural gas, with annual production of 6.18 billion m^{3} (2004 estimate) and reserves of 114.4 billion m^{3} (1 January 2005 estimate).

Minerals—in particular coal, oil, and natural gas, but also emeralds, gold, and nickel—have played an important role in Colombia's GDP and foreign trade in the last 20 years. Accounting for only 1.4 percent of GDP and 13 percent of total exports between 1980 and 1984, minerals represented about 5 percent of GDP and 42 percent of total exports in 2006. The minerals industry has compensated to a certain extent for the decreasing role of agriculture and has expanded the importance of commodities for the economy as a whole. Colombia is the world's leading source of emeralds, and illegal mining is commonplace. Illegal mining, especially of gold, has grown due to Colombia's aggressive counter narcotics policies, which increase the risks associated with the drug economy. However, production of precious minerals is small scale despite high international prices for minerals such as gold.

== History ==
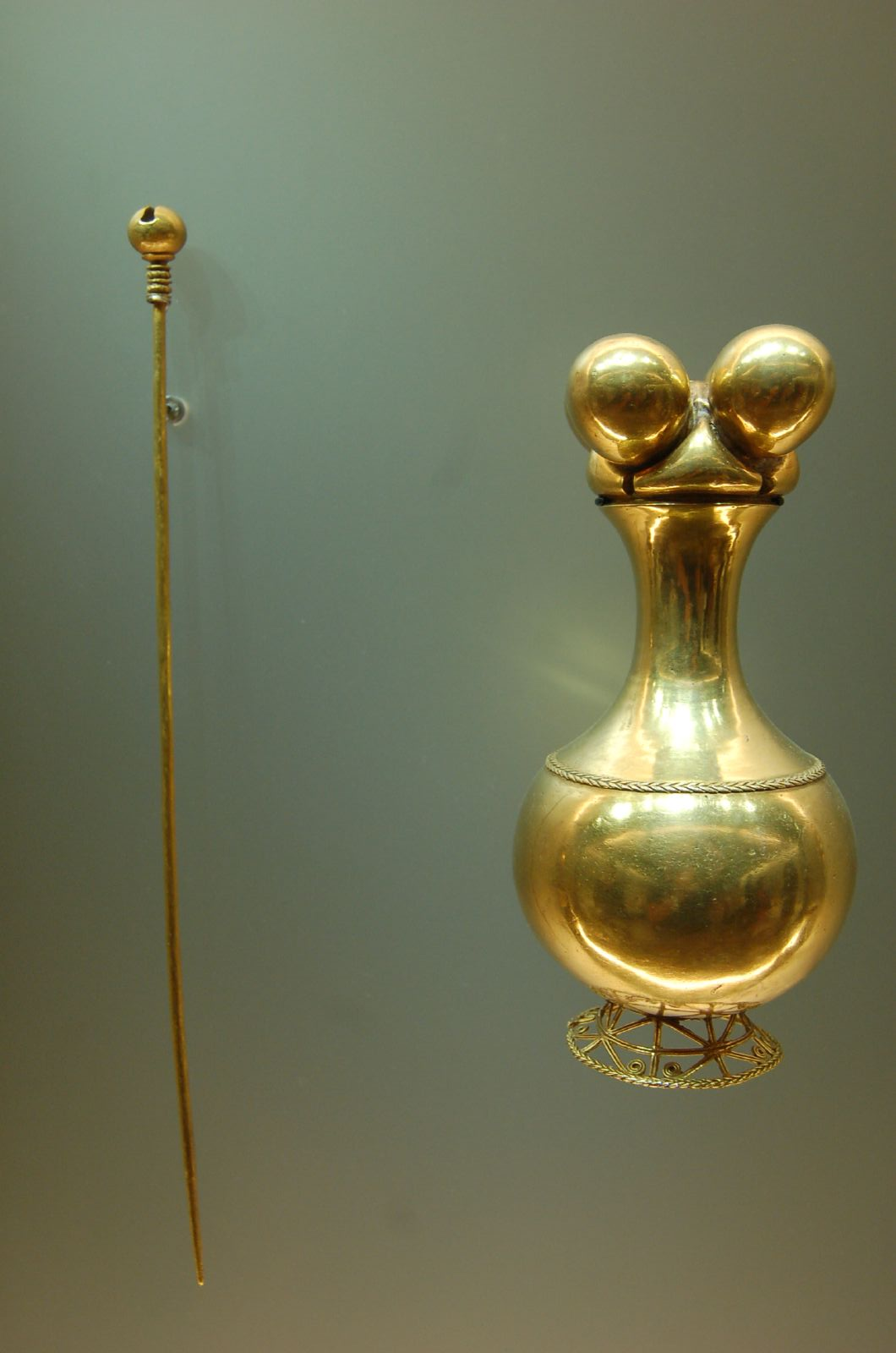
Poporo Quimbaya and pestle. Phytomorphic (fruit-shaped) lime container, gold, 300 BC - 1000 AD

Mining of kaolinite and hematite for pottery pigments started in what is today Colombia since the mid-late neolithic, with archaeological evidence of ceramic production and sedentary groups living in El Abra settlements and the Colombian Caribbean coast (near the towns of San Jacinto, Monsú, Puerto Chacho, and Puerto Hormiga archaeological site) beginning around the year 5940 BCE around the town of San Jacinto. This would place these pottery shards among the oldest ever recovered anywhere. The earliest examples of gold mining and goldwork have been attributed to the Tumaco people of the Pacific coast and date to around 325 BCE. Gold would play a pivotal role in luring the Spanish conquistadores to the area during the 16th century.

Gold was considered sacred by most of the Precolumbian civilizations of the area. In Muisca mythology, Gold (Chiminigagua) was considered itself a deity, and the force of creation. Copper mining was very important for the classic Quimbaya civilization, which developed the tumbaga alloy.

Although significant in the colonial economy, it never commanded a large portion of Colombia's GDP in modern times. With the discovery and exploitation of large coal reserves, however, the role of mining in the national economy expanded in the late 1980s.

== Mineral resources of Colombia ==
=== Oil ===
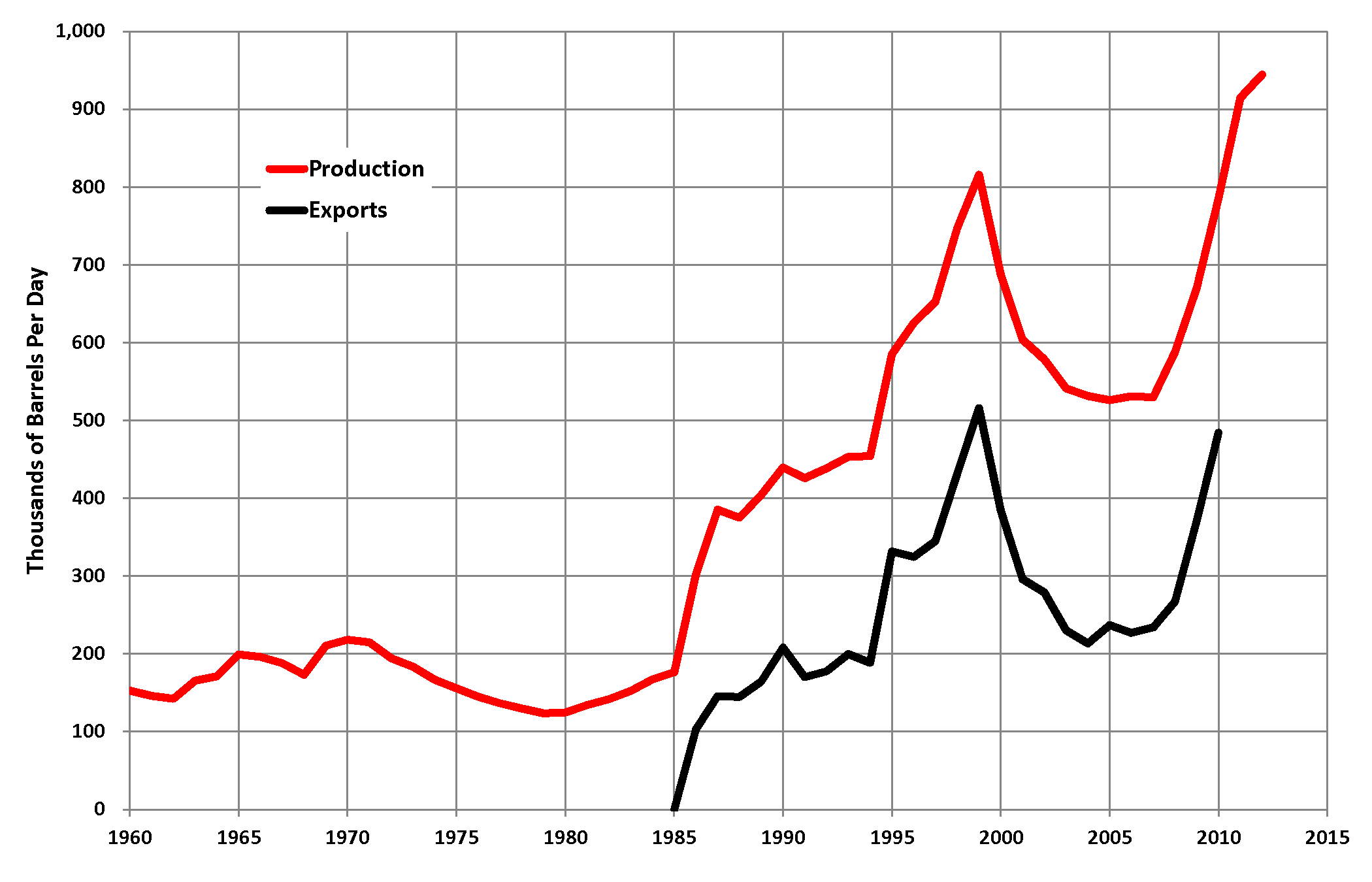
Petroleum production (red) and exports (black), 1960-2012

The discovery of 2 billion barrels (320,000,000 m^{3}) of high-quality oil at the Cusiana and Cupiagua fields, about 200 kilometres (120 mi) east of Bogotá, has enabled Colombia to become a net oil exporter since 1986. The Transandino pipeline transports oil from Orito in the Department of Putumayo to the Pacific port of Tumaco in the Department of Nariño. Total crude oil production averages 620 thousand barrels per day (99,000 m^{3}/d); about 184 thousand barrels per day (29,300 m^{3}/d) is exported.

Oil Production 2011-2021 (kb/d)
2011	2012	2013	2014	2015	2016	2017	2018	2019	2020	2021
915	944	1010	990	1006	886	854	865	886	781	738

The Pastrana government liberalized the petroleum investment policies, leading to an increase in exploration activity. Refining capacity cannot satisfy domestic demand, so some refined products, especially gasoline, must be imported. Plans for the construction of new refineries are under development.

=== Natural gas ===
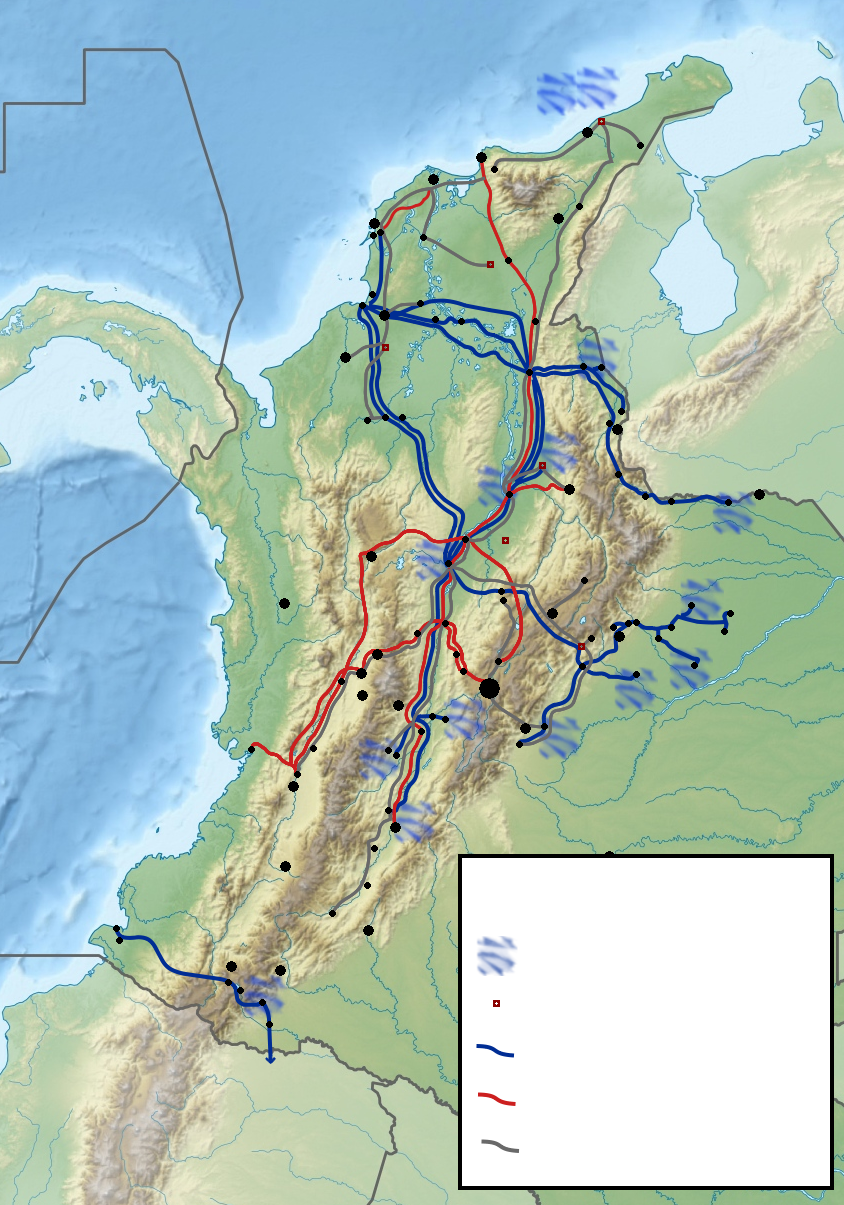
Pipeline map of Colombia, 2010

While Colombia has vast hydroelectric potential, a prolonged drought in 1992 forced severe electricity rationing throughout the country until mid-1993. The consequences of the drought on electricity-generating capacity caused the government to commission the construction or upgrading of 10 thermoelectric power plants. Half will be coal-fired, and half will be fired by natural gas. The government also has begun awarding bids for the construction of a natural gas pipeline system that will extend from the country's extensive gas fields to its major population centers. Plans call for this project to make natural gas available to millions of Colombian households by the middle of the next decade.

Starting in 2004, Colombia became a net energy exporter, exporting electricity to Ecuador and developing connections to Peru, Venezuela and Panama to export to those markets as well. The Trans-Caribbean pipeline connecting western Venezuela to Panama through Colombia was inaugurated by October, 2007, thanks to cooperation between presidents Álvaro Uribe of Colombia, Martín Torrijos of Panama and Hugo Chávez of Venezuela.

Natural gas Production 2011-2021 (billion cubic metres)
2011	2012	2013	2014	2015	2016	2017	2018	2019	2020	2021
10.5	11.5	13.2	12.3	11.6	12.0	11.8	12.4	12.6	12.5	12.6

Since 2022, Colombia has encountered new challenges in its energy sector. President Gustavo Petro, with a strong focus on combating climate change, has declined to issue licenses for new natural gas exploration, despite dwindling reserves. This policy has led to expectations of increased energy costs, compelling the country to import liquefied natural gas (LNG), which is substantially more expensive than domestic sources. The state oil company, Ecopetrol, is attempting to address this shortfall by restarting previously suspended projects and increasing output from smaller fields. Nonetheless, projections indicate a widening gap between gas supply and demand, potentially impacting the competitiveness of Colombian industries.

=== Coal ===
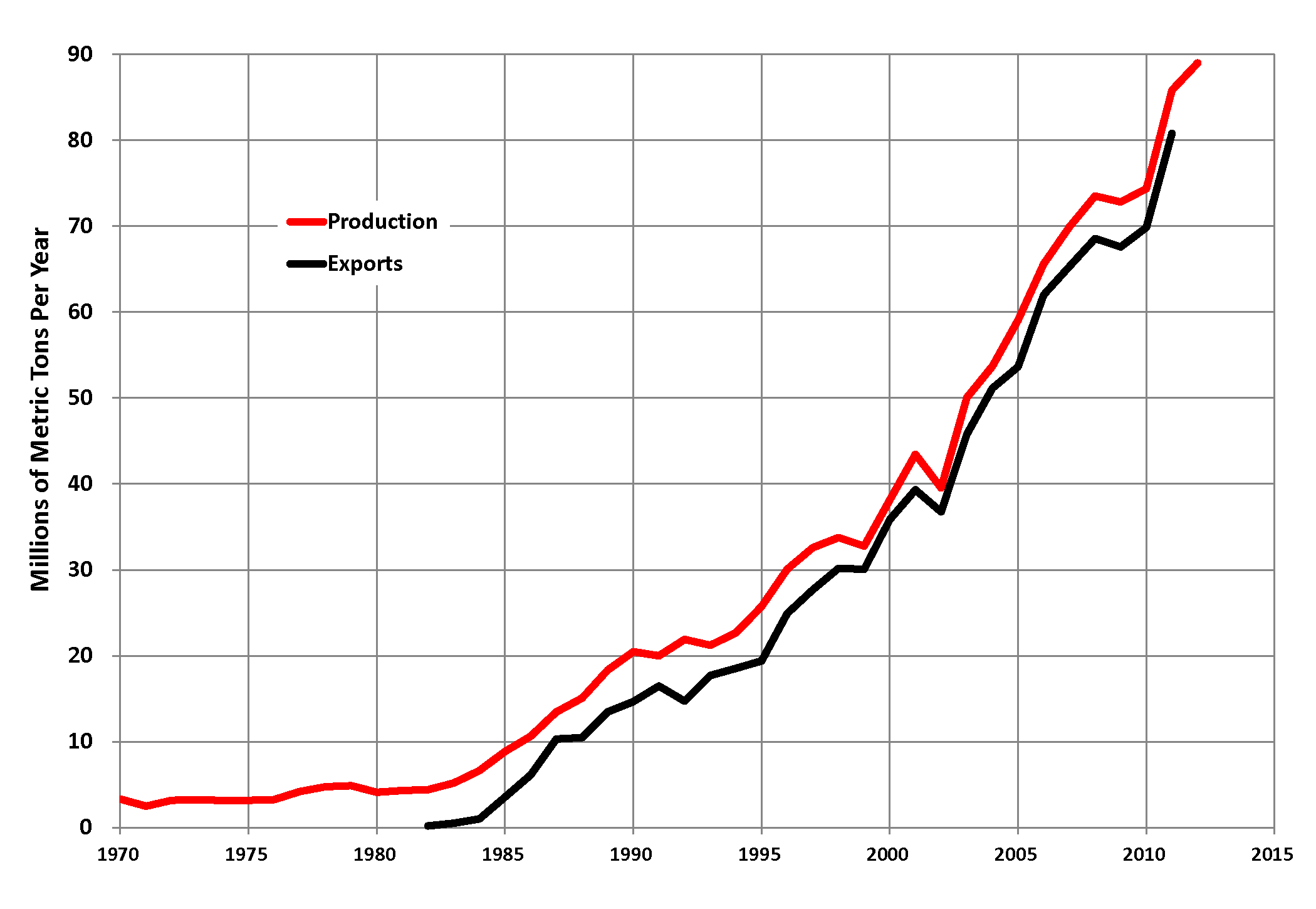
Coal production (red) and exports (black), 1970-2012

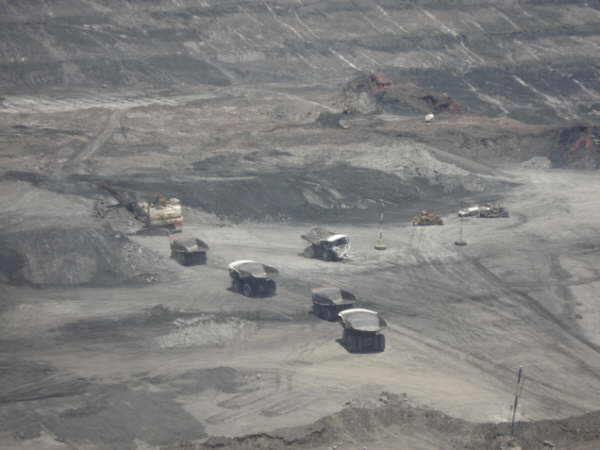
Cerrejón coal mine

Colombia's coal output has increased consistently from 4 million tons in 1981 to 65.6 million tons in 2006, when it contributed 1.4 percent of the world's coal production. In 2006 Colombia accounted for 81 percent of the total coal production in Central and South America. Furthermore, 94 percent of Colombia's coal is of very good quality and is classified as hard, with high heat-generating capacity. Coal has been Colombia's second-largest export since 2001.

The largest coal mines—and the ones that generate the most exports—are located in the north of the country, in the departments of La Guajira and Cesar. Cerrejón is considered to be one of the largest open-pit coal mines in the world. The 2008 coal production in Cerrejon was calculated in 31.2 million tons. There are also smaller coal mines scattered throughout the rest of the nation.

Coal production 2011-2021 (Exajoules)
2011	2012	2013	2014	2015	2016	2017	2018	2019	2020	2021
2.47	2.58	2.47	2.57	2.49	2.62	2.63	2.48	2.45	1.50	1.71

Since 2000 government participation in the production of coal has been decreasing, and there has been a shift to private domestic and foreign investors. Major changes have occurred in the institutional framework of the coal industry in recent years. In particular, in 2000 the government sold the stakes that Colombia Coal (Carbocol), a state-owned company, had in Cerrejón, and the new mining code introduced in 2001 led the government to concentrate on its role as regulator through the Ministry of Mines and Energy.

In 2020, Colombia had 5 trillion short tons of proved coal reserves, mostly bituminous coal, making it the second-largest amount in South America behind Brazil. Colombia produced 54 million short tons (MMst) of coal in 2020, with 9 MMst consumed domestically. However, coal production fell by 42% in 2020 due to the COVID-19 pandemic and a 91-day strike at a major mine in the north of the country. Most of the coal produced in Colombia is exported, making it the fourth-largest coal exporter in the world in 2020, after Australia, Indonesia, and Russia. Coal was the country's second-largest export commodity by value, after oil and petroleum products. Colombia exported 75 MMst of coal in 2020, primarily to Europe and Latin America. In the same year, Colombia was the largest source of U.S. coal imports, accounting for 71% of total U.S. coal imports, or about 6.1 MMst.

In 2021, Colombia was South America’s largest coal producer and the second-largest producer of petroleum and other liquids, after Brazil. The country is also a significant oil exporter; in 2021, it was the fifth-largest crude oil exporter to the United States. Despite being a major coal producer, Colombia uses very little coal domestically, relying mainly on hydropower for its electricity needs and exporting most of its coal production.

=== Gold ===
The production of gold during 2008 was calculated at 15,482 kilograms (34,132 lb), with an increase of 34.2% with respect to the previous year. As of 2009, La Colosa mining project (to be exploited by AngloGold Ashanti) near Cajamarca, Tolima is in planning phase, with calculated reserves of 12.9 million ounces. However, there is controversy about the possible environmental damage. In the Colombian economy, gold is the most important metal in terms of short-term revenues.

=== Silver ===
Silver mining is common in Colombia. One project is Outcrop Silver, whose Santa Ana project covers a significant part of the Mariquita District, where mining records date back to at least 1585.

=== Copper ===
Copper is a growing mining industry in Colombia. There are many new projects that aim to give Colombia the ability to mine more copper. Currently, there is only one company in Colombia that mines for copper.

=== Nickel ===
The Cerro Matoso nickel mine, located in Montelíbano, Córdoba in northern Colombia, combines a lateritic nickel ore deposit with a low cost ferronickel smelter. It produces an average of 52,000 tons of nickel/year, which places this mine in the second place of nickel producers worldwide. Cerromatoso is currently owned by BHP. Disagreement among the direction and the trade union workers, with frequent strikes produced heavy losses during 2008

=== Halite ===
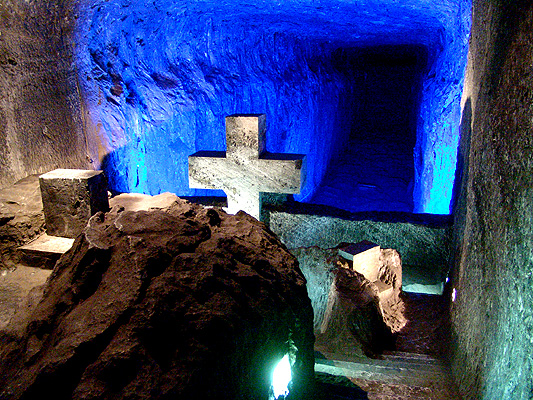
Halite hand-carved Salt Cathedral of Zipaquirá

Halite was explored by the Precolumbian cultures such as the Muisca, as an important trade product. Early halite mining is dated about 5th century BC. The traditional halite mining was described by Alexander von Humboldt during his visit to Zipaquira in 1801. Nowadays, the Zipaquirá halite mine contains the Salt Cathedral of Zipaquirá, entirely hand-carved in halite, including the religious icons, ornaments and architectural details; the Salt Park and the national mineralogy museum.

=== Gemstones ===
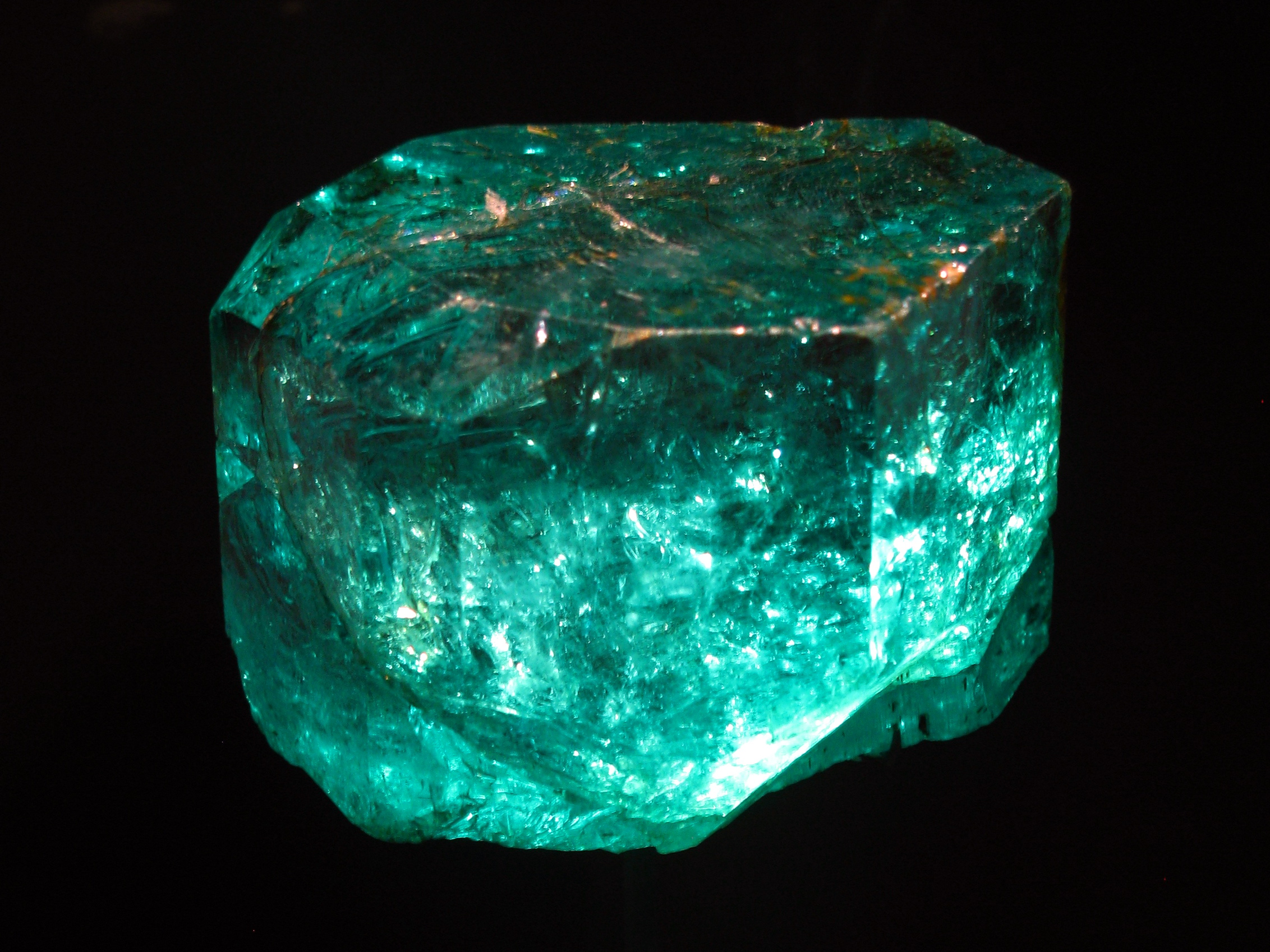
Gachalá Emerald

Colombia is the main producer of finer quality emeralds worldwide. Colombia produced 2.7 Mcarats (540 kg) of emeralds during 2008. Emerald mines are located both in the Boyacá and Cundinamarca Departments. Colombian emeralds constitute 50-95% of the world production, the numbers depending on the year, source and emeralds grade.

== Relevance ==
The Colombian mining industry remains as one of the most dynamic and promising sectors of the Colombian economy, in just one year the investment has reached record figures in excess of two billion dollars and the trend in the short term is not reversed. The mining industry contributes with the economic growth and social development and the development of the regions where the activity is legally established. In addition this demonstrates that the contribution in the social and environmental component is higher than the industry average.

Government efforts to expand mining in Colombia were needed to encourage private sector investment. In the late 1980s, much of Colombia remained inadequately charted, and reserve estimates were considered only marginally reliable. The government set a policy of developing infrastructure (roads, electricity, and communications), providing technical assistance, and encouraging sound credit and legal policies to minimize problems with land titling. Through joint ventures and the promotion of small mining companies, government officials believed that the mining sector could contribute more to national employment, income, and wealth.

== Human rights and crime ==
According to a 2013 U.S. Department of Labor report on the worst forms of child labor and labor conditions around the world, the Colombian mining industry employs underage children. The report indicated that Colombia's industrial sector employed 20% of the working children who were aged 5 to 14 years old. However, and despite the government's participation in a "4-year, $9 million project to combat child labor and improve workplace health and safety in mining", children continue to engage in child labor. In fact, the Bureau of International Labor Affairs issued a List of Goods Produced by Child Labor or Forced Labor in December 2014 where Colombia was mentioned for its use of underage children in brick, coal, gold and emerald mining.

Mining infrastructure is a common target of terrorist attacks, specially the oil and gas pipelines, mainly by the Farc and ELN guerrillas. The mining companies have been implicated in extortion payments to guerrillas in exchange for access to mining locations. The Caño Limón–Coveñas pipeline, which stretches 780 km from the Caño Limón to the Atlantic port of Coveñas, has come under heavy attack, including 170 attacks in 2002 alone, The pipeline remained out of operation for 266 days of that year and the government estimates that these bombings reduced the GDP of Colombia by 0.5%. The bombings, which have occurred on average once every 5 days, have caused substantial environmental damage, often in fragile rainforests and jungles.

On October 14, 1998, a pipeline exploded because of bombs placed by ELN guerrillas. The burning oil spread fire across the Machuca village near Segovia, Antioquia. 85 peasants died and over 30 were injured. On the morning of December 13, 1998, after two days of combat between the army protecting the pipelines and the FARC, a Colombian Air Force helicopter carried out an air attack against guerrillas near the village of Santo Domingo, including the use of cluster-bombs. After the bombing was over, the bodies of seventeen civilians were found in Santo Domingo, including seven children. The case was subsequently handed over to a Colombian military court, with convictions of 31 years of prison for the accused. The decision called for the case to be judged in civil court and for comprehensive reparations to the victims.
