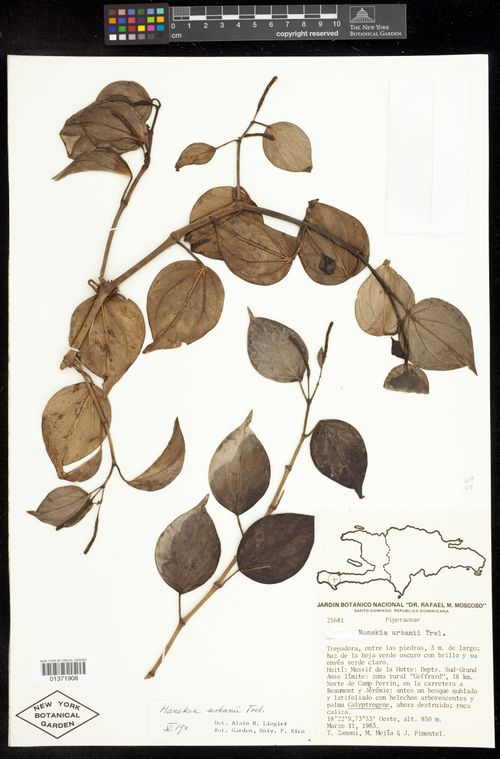

Scientific classification
- Kingdom: Plantae
- Clade: Tracheophytes
- Clade: Angiosperms
- Clade: Magnoliids
- Order: Piperales
- Family: Piperaceae
- Genus: Peperomia
- Species: P. urbani

Binomial name
- Peperomia urbani Trel.

= Peperomia urbani =

Species of flowering plant

Peperomia urbanii or Peperomia urbani is a species of flowering plant from the genus Peperomia. It was first described by William Trelease and published in the book "Repertorium Specierum Novarum Regni Vegetabilis 23: 18, 27. 1926.". It primarily grows on wet tropical biomes It is named after Ignatz Urban, who had botany expeditions in the Caribbean. The species was discovered in Montelíbano, Cuba.

== Distribution ==
It is endemic to Cuba and Haiti. First specimens where found at an altitude of 700-800 meters in Guantánamo, Monte Libanon.

- Cuba
  - Monte Líbano
- Haiti
  - Grand'Anse
