= Cesar coalfield =

Coal mine in Cesar, Colombia

Location
- Location: Cesar department, Colombia

Production
- Products: Coal

The Cesar is a large coal field located in the north of Colombia in Cesar department. Cesar represents one of the largest coal reserve in Colombia having estimated reserves of 6.56 billion tonnes of coal.

== See also ==
- Mineral industry of Colombia
