= José Restrepo =

José Restrepo may refer to:

- José Restrepo (wrestler), Colombian wrestler
- José Manuel Restrepo Vélez, Colombian botanist, politician and historian
- José Manuel Restrepo Abondano, Colombian academic, economist, journalist and politician

== See also ==
- José Reynal-Restrepo, Colombian priest
