= San Bernardo Municipality =

San Bernardo Municipality may refer to:

- San Bernardo Municipality, Durango
- San Bernardo Municipality, Narino - San Bernardo, Nariño
- San Bernardo Municipality, Cundinamarca - San Bernardo, Cundinamarca
