= La Colosa mine =

Gold mine in Cajamarca, Tolima, Colombia

La Colosa
- Location of La Colosa in Colombia
- Location: Cajamarca, Tolima, Colombia; 4.4167°N 75.5000°W
- Products: Gold
- Production: 1,810.35 g (63.858 oz)
- Financial year: 2015
- Opened: 2006
- Company: AngloGold Ashanti

La Colosa is a porphyry gold mine in Colombia. The mine is located in Cajamarca, Tolima on the eastern flanks of the Central Ranges of the Colombian Andes. La Colosa has estimated inferred resources of 24,000,000 ounces (680 t) of gold, grading at 0.9 to 1.0 milligram per kilogram (1.4×10^{−5} to 1.6×10^{−5} oz/lb) of Au. In 2015, the mine produced 1,810.35 grams (63.858 oz) of gold. In 2016, 88.4% of the mining value in Colombia came from coal and gold combined, with nickel following at 9.3%.

== Description ==
La Colosa, covering an area of 600 square kilometres (230 sq mi), is the second major greenfield discovery in Colombia, after Gramalote and believed to have a potential of producing between 800,000 and 1,200,000 ounces (23 and 34 t) of gold per year for 20 years. La Colosa gold project, started in 2006, is based on low-grade porphyry copper deposits containing a small amount of gold. Gold grains in the deposit are found both liberated and locked in sulphides and silicates. The gold mineralization in the deposit is attributed to porphyry intrusions into the Paleozoic schists of the Cajamarca Complex on the eastern flank of the Central Ranges of the Colombian Andes, around 8 Ma. Gold mineralization is believed to have occurred over three early phases of intrusion, which are accompanied by a series of potassic and sodic-calcic alteration events and a late phase of dacite porphyry intrusions.

== Project Suspension ==
Despite the multiple investments made by the Multinational AngloGold Ashanti in favor of the community, including building sports fields among other infrastructures that local governments never developed; the community promoted a popular consultation in order to balance the general opinion of the community, regarding whether or not to give their consent for the development of the project. This, to the extent that beyond the economic advantages mentioned by the Multinational, there were deep disagreements highlighted by various environmentalists, led by citizen Renzo García, the carnival marcha creator, who stated that in their opinion, the generation of environmental liabilities, the contamination and the destruction of the territory would not have any equivalent in the presumed advantages used by the company. In this regard, AngloGold pointed out that the project was an opportunity to strengthen the productive industries of the region. However, beyond both positions, the community finally rejected the project by voting in a popular consultation, a tool available to date in the Colombian legal system. To date it is estimated that the project could be reactivated, to which environmentalists such as Renzo García maintain opposition.

== See also ==
- List of mining areas in Colombia
- Quinchía mine
- Cerro Matoso mine
