= Quinchía mine =

Gold mine in Quinchía, Risaralda, Colombia

- Quinchía in Colombia
- Location: Quinchía, Risaralda, Colombia; 5°20′04.1″N 75°43′57.4″W
- Products: Gold, silver
- Production: 390,000 oz (11 t) (gold); 817,000 oz (23.2 t) (silver)
- Financial year: Lifetime
- Opened: 2006
- Company: Batero Gold

The Quinchía mine is a gold mine in Colombia. The mine is located in Quinchía, Risaralda. The mine has estimated reserves of 390,000 ounces (11 t) of gold and 817,000 ounces (23.2 t) of silver. In 2016, Quinchía produced 73,475.73 kilograms (2,591,780 oz) of gold, and 10,587.99 kilograms (373,480 oz) of silver.

== Description ==
The Quinchía Project, covering an area of 1,407.43 hectares (3,477.8 acres), encompasses multiple porphyry gold target centers that have been early stage drill tested in 2006. Three historic Miocene intrusive centers have been identified, spaced out over a 3 kilometres (1.9 mi) north to south strike, and are at elevations between 1,600 and 1,950 metres (5,250 and 6,400 ft). These intrusive centers are composed of dykes and stocks emplaced in intermediate to felsic volcanic rocks of the Miocene Combia Formation and in Cretaceous basalts. All target centers host gold and copper mineralization.

The volcanic member of the Combia Formation is predominantly composed of basaltic and andesitic leaks, volcanic breccias and porphyry deposits of andesitic to dacitic composition. The mineralizations occur in porphyry veins in the andesitic sections without visible hydrothermal alterations.

Two types of structures are present; parallel veins with a 065-075 strike dipping 58 degrees to the west with variable thicknesses between 5 and 10 centimetres (2.0 and 3.9 in) and a principal vertical vein that is east–west oriented and between 0.8 and 2.25 metres (2.6 and 7.4 ft) thick. These veins are mainly composed of quartz, chalcopyrite, pyrite and sphalerite. The average gold concentration is 20 to 30 milligrams per kilogram (0.00032 to 0.00048 oz/lb) with zones up to 800 to 1,000 grams (28 to 35 oz) of gold.

Additionally, a 1997 study performed by the ICP, revealed concentrations of more than 1000 ppm of copper, lead and zinc. The observed mineralizations suggest that they are related with a contact zone of porphyric intrusions into the Combia Formation and constitute fractures filled by fluids at a later stage.

== See also ==
- List of mining areas in Colombia
- La Colosa mine
- Cerro Matoso mine
