= Guática =

Coordinates: 5°19′N 75°48′W

- Municipality and town
- Flag Coat of arms

- Location of the municipality and town of Guática in the Risaralda Department of Colombia.

- Location in Colombia
- Country: Colombia
- Department: Risaralda Department

Government
  - Mayor: Freddy Bayer Villegas (2016-2019)

Area
  - Municipality and town: 95 km^{2} (37 sq mi)
- Elevation: 1,900 m (6,200 ft)

Population (2023)
  - Municipality and town: 12,423
  - Density: 130/km^{2} (340/sq mi)
  - Urban: 3,996
- Time zone: UTC-5 (Colombia Standard Time)
- Website: Official Site

Guática is a town and municipality in the Risaralda Department of Colombia, about 93 km away from the capital Pereira. In 2023 the town had an estimated population of 12,423.

== History ==
Founded in 1537 by Don Ruy de Vanegas, a lieutenant of Sebastián de Belalcázar and by the priest Esteban de Guevara. The town's name derives from Cacique Guática, supreme ruler of the Santa Maria Valley. To many the date of its foundation is considered to be March 8, 1627 realized by the disposition of Lesmes de Espinoza y Saravia, witness and representative of the Royal court of Spain.

Around 1860, the Antioquean conquistadores founded a new town that was later to be known as San Clemente, Risaralda.

In 1868, the caserío of Guática acquired the character of a corregimiento and becomes part of the District of Quinchía by the name of Nazareth. In 1892 the district of Nazareth is created having Guática as its capital. In 1905 the name of Nazareth was changed to San Clemente.

On April 22, 1921, Guática was proclaimed a municipio, with San Clemente as its main town.

== Culture and leisure ==
The cultural facilities within Guática include the Cultural House of Guatica, the Cultural House of Santa Ana, the Community Center of San Clemente and the Lions Club. There are also folkloric dance groups, orchestras and music bands, a youth music band, and a variety of local peasant musical groups.

For tourism and recreation, Guática has a botanical garden, a multisports center, activities at the Guatica River, the Guillermo Medina Mesa Stadium, and soccer and basketball courts in most of the villages of the municipio.

Its traditional celebrations include Guática's anniversary, traditional festivities patronizing the Virgen del Carmen, sugarcane festivities in Santa Ana and water festivities in San Clemente.

== Climate ==
Guática is situated 1820 metres above sea level, due to that elevation the town has a subtropical highland climate with an average annual temperature of 20 °C.
