= Erlichmanite =

Sulfide mineral

General
- Category: Pyrite
- Formula: OsS_{2}
- IMA symbol: Erl
- Strunz classification: 2/D.17-110
- Dana classification: 2.12.1.16
- Crystal system: Isometric
- Crystal class: Diploidal
- Unit cell: 177.47 Å³

Identification
- Formula mass: 254.33gm
- Colour: Grey
- Crystal habit: Pyritohedral crystals or grains
- Mohs scale hardness: 4.5-5.5
- Luster: Metallic
- Diaphaneity: Opaque
- Specific gravity: 8.28
- Density: 8.28 g/cm3 (Measured), 9.59 g/cm3 (Calc)
- Pleochroism: Non-pleochromic
- Common impurities: Iridium, Rhodium, Ruthenium, Paladium

Erlichmanite is the naturally occurring mineral form of osmium sulfide (OsS_{2}). It is grey with a metallic luster, hardness around 5, and specific gravity about 9. It is found in noble metal placer deposits. Erlichmanite is named for Jozef Erlichman, an electron microprobe analyst at NASA's Ames Research Center.
