= Marmato, Caldas =

- Municipality and town
- Flag Coat of arms

- Location of the municipality and town of Marmato, Caldas in the Caldas Department of Colombia.

- Location in Colombia
- Coordinates: 5°28′31″N 75°35′57″W
- Country: Colombia
- Department: Caldas Department

Area
  - Total: 41 km^{2} (16 sq mi)

Population (Census 2018)
  - Total: 8,485
  - Density: 210/km^{2} (540/sq mi)
- Time zone: UTC-5 (Colombia Standard Time)

Marmato is a town and municipality in the Colombian Department of Caldas. Founded in 1540, Marmato has a population of 10,000 people. It is one of the historic gold-mining regions of the hemisphere.

The town used to be the home of a large population of Cornish miners, who were drawn to this location from their native land to work the mines.

== Strip mining and the murder of a priest ==
In 1946, after various disputes about mining rights, the government established a zone in the hills where the town stands, which was to be the preserve for mining by the various small miners of the town. This was in effect until 2007, when the Canadian mining company Medoro Resources merged with a Colombian company to form the conglomerate called "Gran Colombia Gold". This corporation proposed digging a massive strip mine on the site of the town, which would require the total demolition of the town and the relocation of its populace.

Naturally, the people of the town have resisted this, claiming that the government had violated its own rules in agreeing to this. On 1 September 2011, the local parish priest, the Reverend José Reynal-Restrepo was returning on his motorbike from a trip to Bogotá, the nation's capital, to clarify the company's claims that the local Archbishop had agreed to the sale of the Church's property in the town. He was stopped just outside the town and shot to death.

Opponents of the plans to move the town claim that it was agents of the mining company who murdered him, due to his opposition to the plans. Reynal himself had made a video just days before his death, in which he said that only his death would end his opposition to the move. Spokesmen for the mining company say that his death was a regrettable case of random banditry.

A partially crowdfunded documentary, Marmato released in 2014, directed by Mark Grieco, chronicles six years of the battle between Gran Colombia Gold and the community.

== See also ==
- Cornish emigration
