= Freibergite =

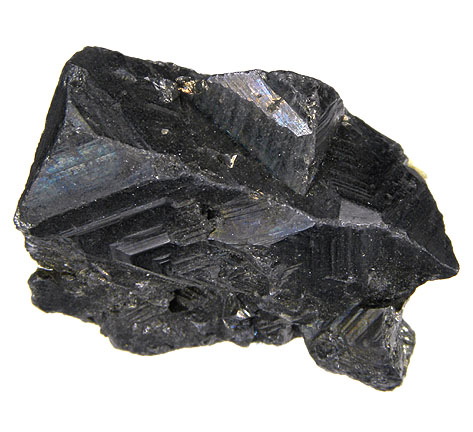

General
- Category: Sulfosalt minerals
- Formula: Cu_{12}Sb_{4}S_{13}
- IMA symbol: Fb
- Strunz classification: 2.GB.05
- Crystal system: Cubic
- Crystal class: Hextetrahedral (4̅3m); H-M symbol: (4̅ 3m)
- Space group: I4̅3m

Identification
- Formula mass: 1,929.46 g/mol
- Color: Steel gray to black
- Crystal habit: massive to well formed crystals
- Cleavage: None
- Fracture: Uneven
- Mohs scale hardness: 3.5–4
- Luster: Metallic
- Streak: reddish black
- Diaphaneity: Opaque

Freibergite is a complex sulfosalt mineral of silver, copper, iron, antimony and arsenic with formula (Ag,Cu,Fe)_{12}(Sb,As)_{4}S_{13}. It has cubic crystals and is formed in hydrothermal deposits. It forms one solid solution series with tetrahedrite and another with argentotennantite. Freibergite is an opaque, metallic steel grey to black and leaves a reddish-black streak. It has a Mohs hardness of 3.5 to 4.0 and a specific gravity of 4.85 to 5. It is typically massive to granular in habit with no cleavage and an irregular fracture.

The mineral was first described in 1853 from an occurrence in the silver mines of the type locality at Freiberg, Saxony.
