= Cerro Matoso mine =

Open-pit ferronickel mine in Colombia

- Location of Cerro Matoso in Colombia

Location
- Location: Montelíbano, Córdoba, Colombia; 7.9049°N 75.5516°W

Production
- Products: Nickel
- Production: 41,000 t (40,000 long tons; 45,000 short tons)
- Financial year: 2014
- Type: Open-pit

History
- Opened: 1980

Owner
- Company: South32
- Acquired: 2015

The Cerro Matoso mine in northwest of Colombia is one of the largest open-pit ferronickel mines in the world. and the largest mine of South America, containing the largest nickel reserve in Colombia. It is operated by Cerro Matoso S.A., a company that was owned by Hanna Company and the Instituto de Fomento Industrial (IFI), then by Shell, Billiton, and then the Anglo-Australian multinational BHP, since 2015 is owned by South32. There have been allegations that the mine's operations have caused heavy metal pollution affecting especially local indigenous Zenu and Afro-Descendant residents. These allegations have been rejected by Cerro Matoso on the basis of the available scientific and medical evidence. In March 2018 a Review Chamber of the Constitutional Court of Colombia ordered Cerro Matoso to pay damages to local communities. This decision was reversed partially in September 2018 by the Plenary Chamber of the Constitutional Court on the basis that it did not comply with constitutional precedent for payment of damages and noting that there was no evidence of a direct correlation between the mining operations and the alleged damages.

== Geology ==
The mine is situated in the northwest of Colombia in the municipality of Montelíbano, Córdoba Department. The deposit was discovered in 1940. It developed over a Cretaceous peridotitic protolith, which is exposed in the form of an isolated elongated hill covering an area of about 4 square kilometres (1.5 sq mi). Ten distinct lithostratigraphic units have been characterized with the highest-grade lateritic nickel ore deposits in the world. The 108 megatonnes (106,000,000 long tons; 119,000,000 short tons) of ore contains 615,000 tonnes (605,000 long tons; 678,000 short tons) of nickel metal.

The hill comprises a holocrystalline rock of fine crystal size. Harzburgites and serpentinized dunites contain between 30 and 90% olivine, replaced by serpentinite. Two sections through the weathering profile were sampled from an area of the mine with high (pit 1) and lower (pit 2) Ni grades. From bottom to top, the profile in pit 1 is weakly serpentinized peridotitic protolith, saprolitized peridotite, green saprolite (main ore horizon), tachylite (a Fe oxide horizon), black saprolite, yellow and red laterite. The sequence is capped by a magnetic to nonmagnetic ferricrete known locally as "canga". The succession in pit 2 is from serpentinized peridotite, saprolitized peridotite, brown saprolite, yellow and red laterite, and lacks the green saprolite ore horizon. All the units in pit 2 have currently uneconomic Ni grades.

The thickness of the units is highly variable, but most of the major horizons have maximum thicknesses of the order of tens of meters. Both pits contain abundant fault- and joint-related silicate veins. These veins contain the distinctive green mineral known as garnierite (actually pimelite, a form of nickeliferous talc) as well as quartz and chalcedony, and they can have a Ni content of up to 30% to 40%.

== Mining ==
Mining commenced in 1980 at Cerro Matoso and nickel production started in 1982 under the Colombian Government, BHP and Hanna Mining Company ownership.

Nickel production in FY2008 was 41,800 tonnes (41,100 long tons; 46,100 short tons) of contained nickel and in 2014 was 41,000 tonnes (40,000 long tons; 45,000 short tons). In 2017, Colombia was the 11th highest producer of nickel in the world with about 9% of its total mining value coming from nickel.

In May 2015, BHP spun off a new entity called South32 for Cerro Matoso and "its non-core businesses".

=== Reserves ===
With exploration rights over 77,000 hectares (190,000 acres) in the main part of the Colombian nickel belt, Cerro Matoso has mining concessions containing reserves capable of sustaining the current level of production for at least 20 years. The mine has an estimated reserve life of 42 years, based on current production levels. BHP has expanded this significantly by building a third and fourth processing line and a heap leaching operation. BHP Billitons 2008 annual report stated proven ore reserves as under 25 megatonnes (25,000,000 long tons; 28,000,000 short tons), with probable reserves between 25 and 70 megatonnes (25,000,000 and 69,000,000 long tons; 28,000,000 and 77,000,000 short tons). Data acquired by the Colombian mining authority UPME indicated values in 2007 between 21 and 41 megatonnes (21,000,000 and 40,000,000 long tons; 23,000,000 and 45,000,000 short tons). As of 2013 Cerro Matoso had about 108 million tonnes of 0.57% grade ore nickel. The ore reserve has increased as a result of revised price forecasts, reducing the laterite ore cut-off grade used in the reserve estimation from 1.0% Ni to 0.6% Ni.

== Environment and public health ==
There have been allegations that Cerro Matoso's mine operations have caused damage to the environment, but the company strongly disputes these allegations on the basis of the available scientific and medical evidence, including the periodic air and water measurements carried out in the area surrounding the mine. The mine tailings or scum have been found to contain Fe_{2}O_{3}, Nickel oxide among other oxides, enstatite (pyroxene) and alpha-Alumina, Fe3+ clusters in a glassy matrix. However, Cerro Matoso notes that in its operations, the mine tailings or scum are safely disposed of within the confines of the mine and not exposed to the external environment. In addition, scientific studies have confirmed that Cerro Matoso's tailings are not corrosive, flammable, reactive or toxic. These findings are consistent with the findings in further exposure studies on the same kind of residue that have been conducted elsewhere in the world.

Heavy metals such as mercury, zinc, copper, lead and cadmium have been found in rain water. Local indigenous Zenu residents have complained for decades about adverse health effects, such as an increase in neoplasms and respiratory, dermatological, ocular, and reproductive problems. It has been alleged that the heavy metals have caused irreparable genotoxic damage in people living in the surrounding area. A small study examined the hair of people suspected to have hydroarsenicism and confirmed presence of arsenic. However, the alleged responsibility of Cerro Matoso for health problems suffered by members of the surrounding communities is rejected by the company on the basis of the evidence available. The most recent air quality study was carried out by the Regional Environmental Corporation (a Colombian state agency) in 2016 and revealed “optimal conditions” in relation to the measurements of all the pollutants criteria and their permitted levels. In addition, Cerro Matoso has noted that the air quality stations installed in the area surrounding the mine are certified by the Colombian National Institute of Hydrology, Meteorology and Environmental Studies, and their periodic measurements are reported publicly and confirm the adequate conditions of air quality in the area. Cerro Matoso has further noted that agents such as mercury, lead, copper or arsenic have not been found in the mining deposit or as a result of the mining operations. However, some of these agents are naturally present in the geology of the area and as a result of the illegal exploitation of gold that takes place in the region.

In 2015, the Colombian Institute of Legal Medicine and Forensic Sciences issued a study of the public health impact of the mine. It reported that people living up to 15 km away from Cerro Matoso commonly had a high frequency of skin lesions and upper respiratory tract irritation. It also noted that some of the examined members of the communities had elevated levels of nickel in urine and blood samples, however found no correlation between the results found in blood and urine. The study was criticised by Colombian and international experts for its severe methodological and procedural errors. The experts noted that the study documented several general health factors in the local communities which correlate with their epidemiological profile, such as the lack of drinking water, firewood cooking, garbage burning, or the existence of unpaved roads. Regional health studies show a similar correlation in most communities in the Caribbean region in which Cerro Matoso operates.

In March 2018, the 7th Review Chamber of the Constitutional Court of Colombia sided with local residents and ordered the mine to pay for damages. This decision was later reversed in September 2018 by the Plenary Chamber of the Constitutional Court on the basis that it did not comply with constitutional precedent for payment of damages and noting that there was no evidence of a direct correlation between the mining operations and the alleged damages.

== See also ==
- List of mining areas in Colombia
- La Colosa mine
- Quinchía mine
