= Buriticá =

- Municipality and town

- Flag

- Location of the municipality and town of Buriticá in the Antioquia Department of Colombia

- Location in Colombia
- Coordinates: 6°45′0″N 75°55′0″W
- Country: Colombia
- Department: Antioquia Department
- Subregion: Western
- Time zone: UTC-5 (Colombia Standard Time)
- Website: http://www.buritica-antioquia.gov.co/

Buriticá is a town and municipality in Antioquia Department, Colombia.

== Demography ==
An 1852 watercolor by Henry Price depicts an Indian man and woman from Buriticá wearing blue and white clothing. It bears the notation, "Colonel Codazzi believes that this (pure) ethnic group is almost extinct."

According to the 2005 census data from the National Administrative Department of Statistics, the town's ethnic composition is:

- Mestizo & White (98.4%)
- Afro-Colombian (1.6%)
