= Tetrahedrite =

Copper antimony sulfosalt mineral

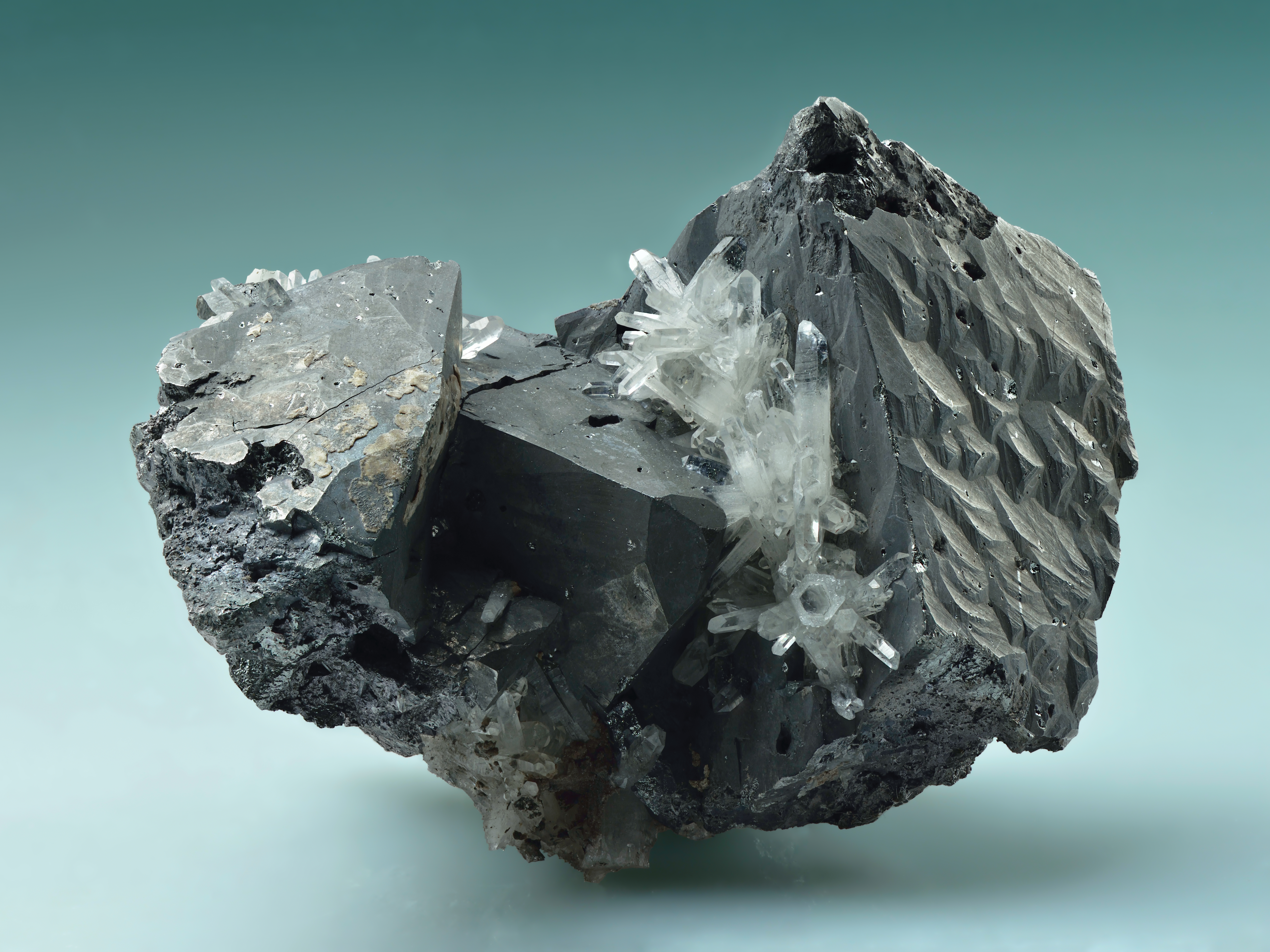
- Tetrahedrite crystal with traces of quartz (in middle) and micro mimetite, specimen size 3.5 × 2.5 × 2.5 cm

General
- Category: Sulfosalt mineral
- Formula: (Cu,Fe)_{12}Sb_{4}S_{13}
- Strunz classification: 2.GB.05
- Crystal system: Cubic
- Crystal class: Hextetrahedral (4̅3m); H-M symbol: (4̅ 3m)
- Space group: I4̅3m
- Unit cell: a = 10.39(16) Å; Z = 2

Identification
- Color: Steel gray to iron-gray
- Crystal habit: Groups of tetrahedral crystals; massive, coarse to fine compact granular
- Twinning: Contact and penetration twins on {111}
- Cleavage: None
- Fracture: Uneven to subconchoidal
- Tenacity: Somewhat brittle
- Mohs scale hardness: 3 1/2 – 4
- Luster: Metallic, commonly splendent
- Streak: Black, brown to dark red
- Diaphaneity: Opaque, except in very thin fragments
- Specific gravity: 4.97
- Optical properties: Isotropic
- Refractive index: n greater than 2.72

Tetrahedrite is a copper antimony sulfosalt mineral with the formula: (Cu,Fe)_{12}Sb_{4}S_{13}. It is the antimony endmember of the continuous solid solution series with arsenic-bearing tennantite. Pure endmembers of the series are rarely if ever seen in nature. Of the two, the antimony rich phase is more common. Other elements also substitute in the structure, most notably iron and zinc, along with less common silver, mercury and lead. Bismuth also substitutes for the antimony site and bismuthian tetrahedrite or annivite is a recognized variety. The related, silver dominant, mineral species freibergite, although rare, is notable in that it can contain up to 18% silver.

== Mineralogy ==
Tetrahedrite gets its name from the distinctive tetrahedron shaped cubic crystals. The mineral usually occurs in massive form, it is a steel gray to black metallic mineral with Mohs hardness of 3.5 to 4 and specific gravity of 4.6 to 5.2.

Tetrahedrite occurs in low to moderate temperature hydrothermal veins and in some contact metamorphic deposits. It is a minor ore of copper and associated metals. It was first described in 1845 for occurrences in Freiberg, Saxony, Germany. Historically, it was an important ore of copper, the formula Cu_{3}SbS_{3} corresponding with 57.5% of the metal; it was also worked as an ore of silver, of which element it sometimes contains as much as 30%.

== Applications ==
The now-defunct company Alphabet Energy announced plans to offer a thermoelectric device based on tetrahedrite to turn heat into electricity. The company claimed that other thermoelectrics typically produce about 2.5 percent efficiency, while tetrahedrite could achieve 5 to 10 percent.

Other thermoelectrics are either scarce, expensive ($24–146/kg vs $4 for tetrahedrite) and/or toxic. Working with a natural material also reduces manufacturing costs.

== Images ==
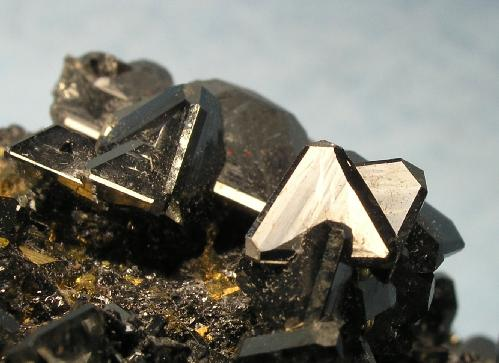
Tetrahedrite crystals with chalcopyrite and sphalerite from the Casapalca Mine, Peru (size: 8.2 × 6.4 × 4.7 cm)

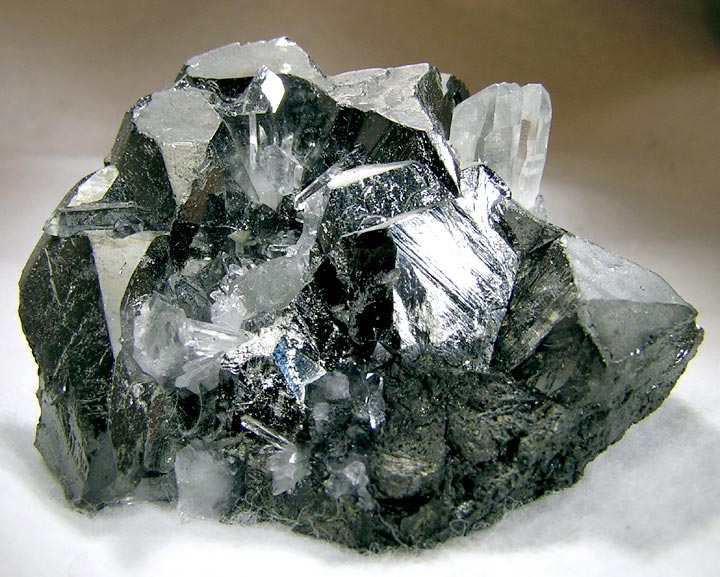
Tetrahedrite from Casapalca Mine, Casapalca, Huarochiri Province, Lima Department, Peru

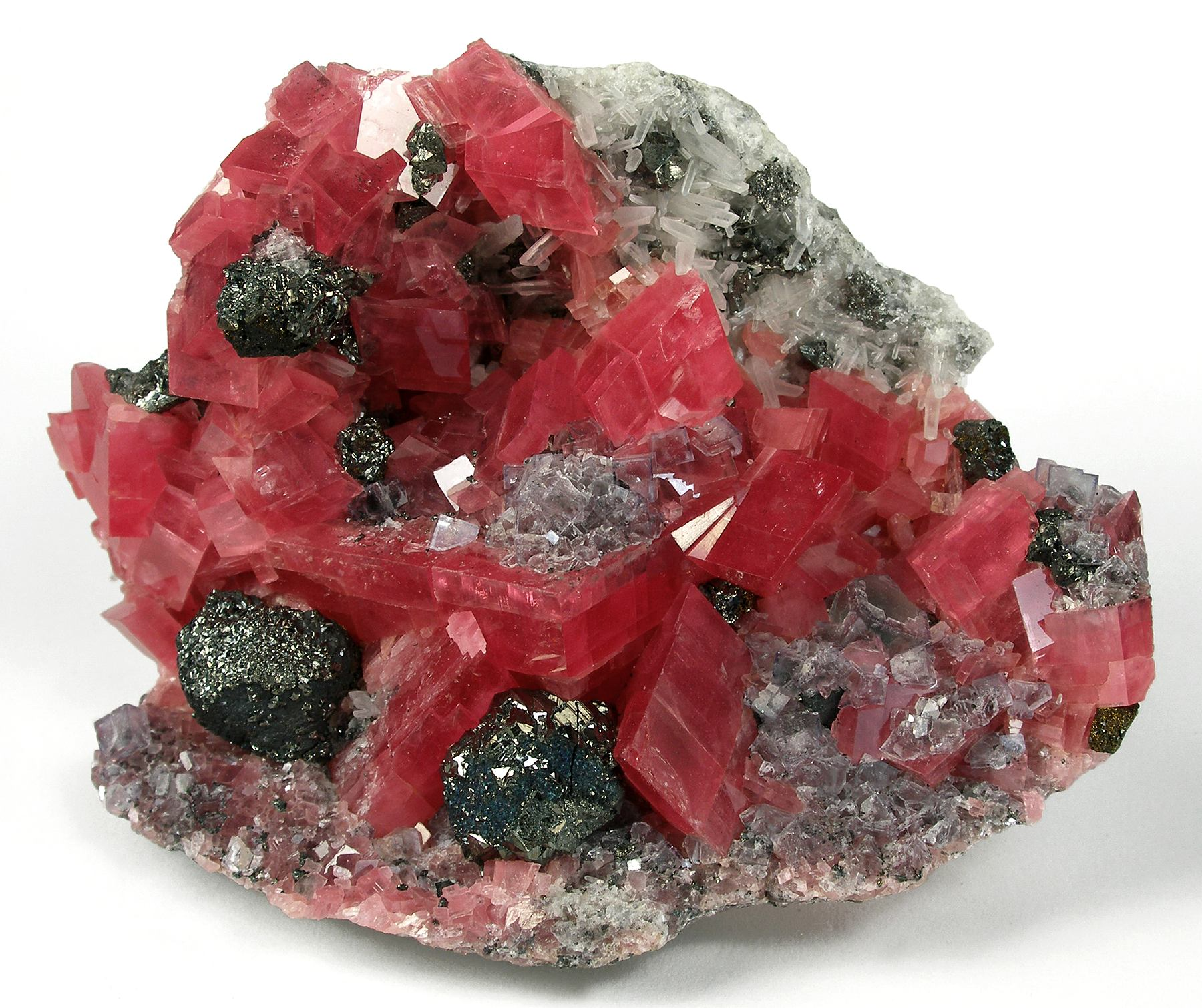
Rhodochrosite with fluorite, tetrahedrite and quartz; the tetrahedrite occurs as sharp, metallic crystals

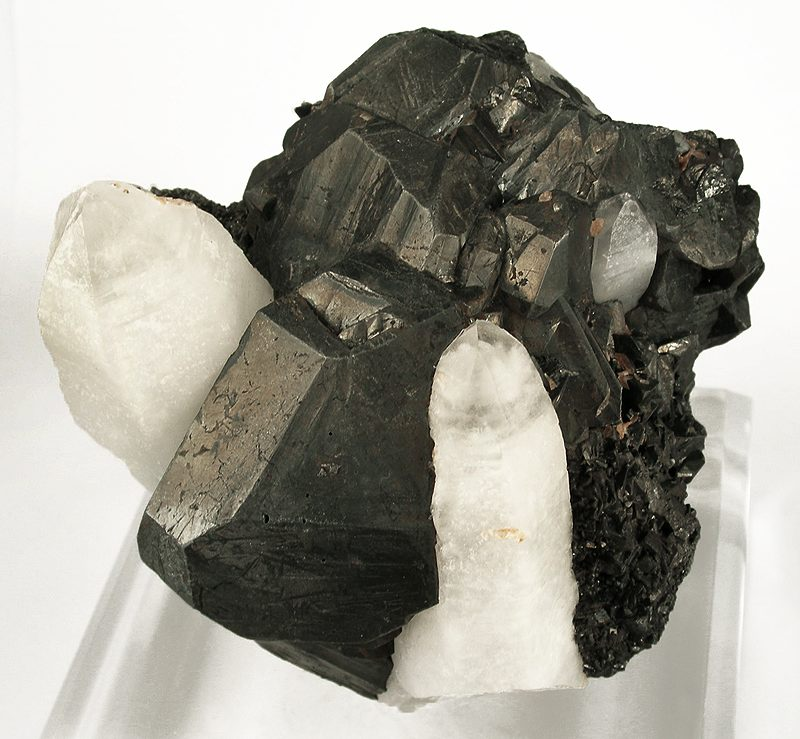
Tetrahedrite crystals to several inches on size in combination with quartz crystals

== See also ==
- Bornite
- Cuprite
- List of minerals
