= José Reynal-Restrepo =

Colombian Catholic priest (1977–2011)

The Reverend José Reynal-Restrepo (1977–2011) was a priest of the Roman Catholic Archdiocese of Manizales and the parish priest of the town of Marmato, Caldas in Colombia, South America. Founded in 1540, Marmato is one of the historic gold-mining regions of the hemisphere. He was murdered on September 1, 2011, while returning home.

== Strip mining and the murder of a priest ==
From 1946 onwards, the Colombian government had established a zone in the hills where the town stands as a preserve for mining by the various small miners of the town. This was in effect until 2007, when the Canadian mining company Medoro Resources merged with a Colombian mining company to form a conglomerate called "Gran Colombia Gold". The new corporation proposed digging a massive strip mine on the site of the town. This would require the total demolition of the town and the relocation of its populace.

The people of the town resisted this, claiming that the government had violated its own rules in agreeing to this. Reynal, the local Roman Catholic pastor had resisted attempts by the mining company to get his endorsement of their plans. In August 2011, Reynal was given notice by the company that the Archbishop had agreed to the sale of the Church's property in the town. He decided to travel to Bogotá, the nation's capital, to verify the company's claims. On 1 September 2011, while Reynal-Restrepo was returning on his motorbike from the trip, he was stopped just outside the town and shot to death.

Opponents of the plans to move the town claim that it was agents of the mining company who murdered him, due to his opposition to the plans. Reynal himself had made a video just days before his death, in which he said that only his death would end his opposition to the move. Spokesmen for the mining company say that his death was a regrettable case of random banditry.

== See also ==
- Marmato, Caldas
