= San Bernardo, Nariño =

Coordinates: 1°30′39″N 77°2′48″W

San Bernardo
- Municipality and town
- Flag

- Location of the municipality and town of San Bernardo, Nariño in the Nariño Department of Colombia.
- Country: Colombia
- Department: Nariño Department

Population (Census 2018)
  - Total: 8,874
- Time zone: UTC-5 (Colombia Standard Time)

San Bernardo (Spanish pronunciation: [sam beɾˈnaɾðo]) is a town and municipality in the Nariño Department, Colombia.

== Climate ==
San Bernando has a warm subtropical highland climate (Köppen Cfb) with moderate to heavy rainfall year-round. Like most of Andean Nariño Department but unlike most places with a subtropical highland climate, San Bernando has a marked summer minimum in rainfall instead of the more usual winter minimum.

Climate data for San Bernardo, elevation 2,190 m (7,190 ft), (1981–2010)
Month	Jan	Feb	Mar	Apr	May	Jun	Jul	Aug	Sep	Oct	Nov	Dec	Year
Mean daily maximum °C (°F)	21.2 (70.2)	21.4 (70.5)	21.4 (70.5)	21.8 (71.2)	21.6 (70.9)	21.5 (70.7)	21.1 (70.0)	21.4 (70.5)	22.1 (71.8)	21.7 (71.1)	20.9 (69.6)	20.9 (69.6)	21.4 (70.5)
Daily mean °C (°F)	15.6 (60.1)	15.9 (60.6)	15.9 (60.6)	16.0 (60.8)	16.0 (60.8)	15.7 (60.3)	15.4 (59.7)	15.5 (59.9)	15.8 (60.4)	15.7 (60.3)	15.5 (59.9)	15.5 (59.9)	15.7 (60.3)
Mean daily minimum °C (°F)	11.4 (52.5)	11.4 (52.5)	11.7 (53.1)	11.9 (53.4)	11.9 (53.4)	11.2 (52.2)	10.5 (50.9)	10.4 (50.7)	10.5 (50.9)	11.2 (52.2)	11.7 (53.1)	11.6 (52.9)	11.3 (52.3)
Average precipitation mm (inches)	220.4 (8.68)	175.7 (6.92)	206.6 (8.13)	217.2 (8.55)	169.6 (6.68)	74.7 (2.94)	54.8 (2.16)	40.7 (1.60)	81.5 (3.21)	240.8 (9.48)	311.5 (12.26)	247.4 (9.74)	2,041 (80.35)
Average precipitation days	19	17	20	20	20	15	14	12	12	19	23	22	211
Average relative humidity (%)	85	85	85	85	84	82	79	78	77	83	86	87	83
Mean monthly sunshine hours	124.0	101.6	96.1	102.0	117.8	138.0	161.2	164.3	135.0	120.9	102.0	111.6	1,474.5
Mean daily sunshine hours	4.0	3.6	3.1	3.4	3.8	4.6	5.2	5.3	4.5	3.9	3.4	3.6	4.0
Source: Instituto de Hidrologia Meteorologia y Estudios Ambientales
