= Quinchía =

- Town and Municipality
- Quinchía
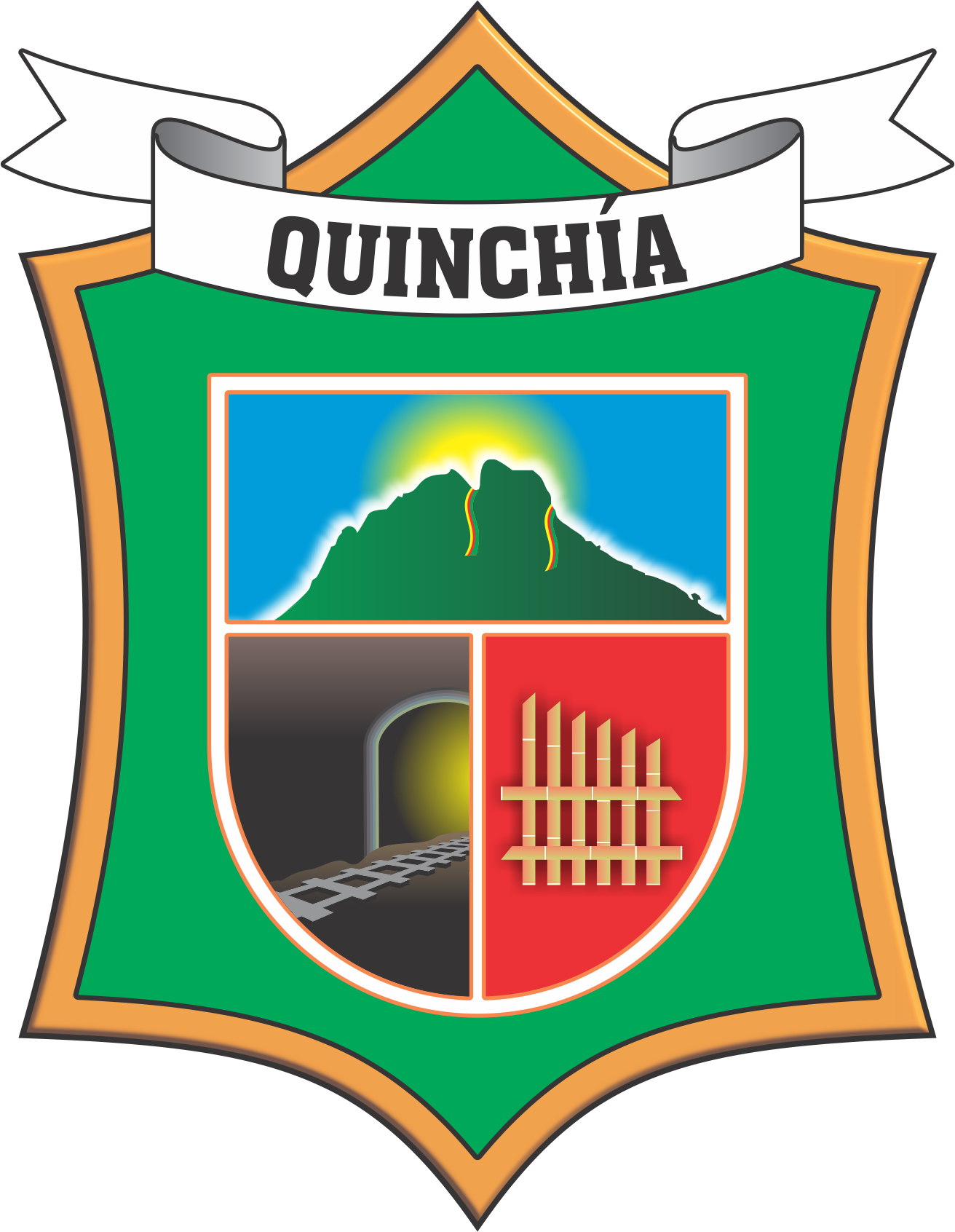
- Flag Coat of arms
- Nickname: Villa de los Cerros, (Village of the Hills)
- Location of Quinchía in the department of Risaralda.

- Location within Colombia
- Coordinates (Urban area): 5°20′16.26″N 75°43′46.73″W
- Country: Colombia
- Department: Risaralda
- Region: Andean Region of Colombia
- Cultural Area: Colombian Coffee-Growers Axis
- Founded: 1888
- Administrative Division: Boroughs: Batero; Irra; Naranjal; Santa Helena

Government
  - Type: Strong Mayor-Council
  - Mayor: Alicia Palacio Restrepo (2008-2011)

Area
  - Total: 149.8 km^{2} (57.8 sq mi)
- Elevation: 1,825 m (5,988 ft)

Population (2023)
  - Total: 27,890
  - Density: 186.2/km^{2} (482.2/sq mi)
- According to National Department for Statistics of Colombia (DANE)
- Time zone: UTC-5 (Bogotá (Colombia).)
- Website: http://quinchia-risaralda.gov.co/index.shtml

Quinchía, also known as Villa de los Cerros (Village of the Hills), is a town and municipality in the Department of Risaralda, Colombia. About 110 km away from the capital Pereira. In 2023 the town had an estimated population of 27,890.

== History ==
Around 1842, the decimated indigenous population, as a result of the violence against them by the Spaniards, decided to formalize the organization of the hamlet, creating Quinchía Viejo. On November 29, 1886, the current municipality of Quinchía emerged, by the will of Messrs. Gabriel Vinasco, Zoilo Bermúdez, José Natalio and Protasio Gómez.

Quinchia was officialized on November 29, 1888, also On April 24, 1912, the town was declared a municipality. At the beginning of the 20th century, the Indigenous Reservation would end, through negotiations and all kinds of maneuvers by the Antioquia settlers who ended up taking over the lands.

It is located in the Colombian coffee growing axis, part of the "Coffee Cultural Landscape" UNESCO World Heritage Site in 2011.

== Climate ==
Quinchía has a subtropical highland climate with an average annual temperature of 18 °C.
