= Cajamarca, Tolima =

Coordinates: 4°25′N 75°30′W

- Municipality and town
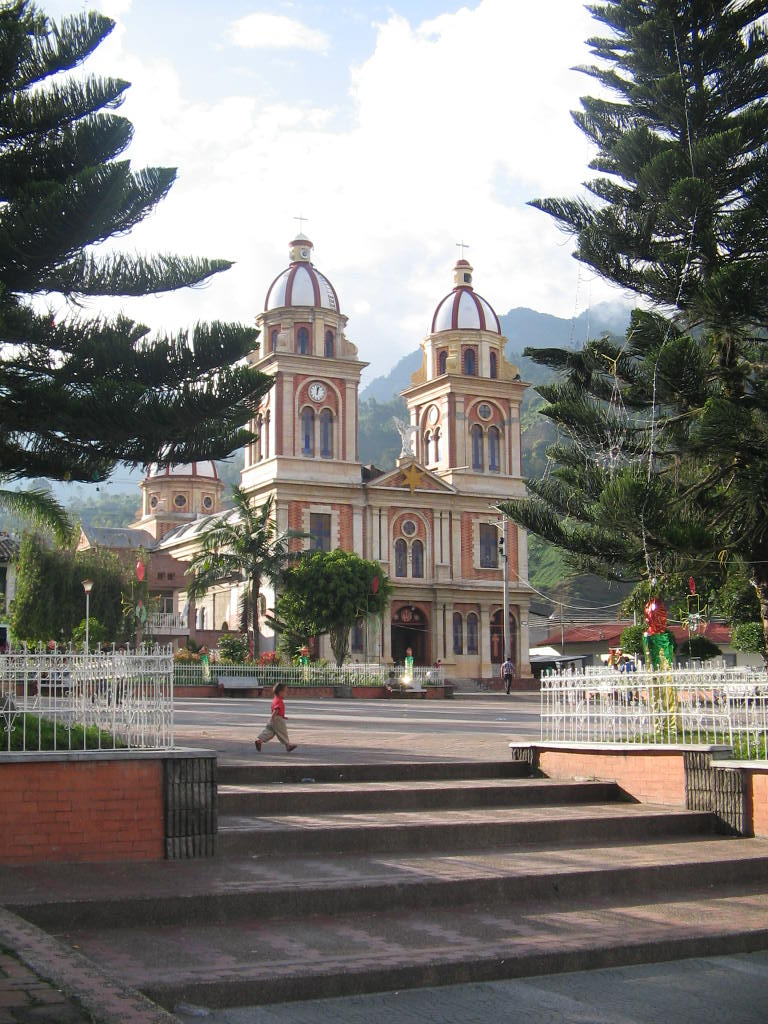
- Church of Cajamarca

- Flag Coat of arms

- Location of the municipality and town of Cajamarca, Tolima in the Tolima Department of Colombia.
- Country: Colombia
- Department: Tolima Department

Government
  - Mayor: Julio Roberto Vargas Malagón

Area
  - Total: 520 km^{2} (200 sq mi)
- Elevation: 1,814 m (5,951 ft)

Population (Census 2018)
  - Total: 17,309
  - Density: 33/km^{2} (86/sq mi)
- Time zone: UTC-5 (Colombia Standard Time)

Cajamarca is a town and municipality in the Tolima Department of Colombia. The population of the municipality was 17,309 as of the 2018 census. The municipality has two populated centres, the town centre of Cajamarca and the locality of Anaime. It is located along the Pan-American Highway.

In 1886, colonisers from Antioquia colonised the area currently known as Anaime, and started to develop the land for agriculture. In 1913, the Bishop of Ibagué Ismael Perdomo bought the land of the municipality and officially founded the municipality of Cajamarca, which stands for 'cold land' in Quechua.

The main economic activity is agriculture, and the town is also known as the 'agricultural larder' of Colombia.

Internationally, the town is best known as the location of the La Colosa gold mining project of AngloGold Ashanti.

== Climate ==
Climate data for Cajamarca, elevation 1,920 m (6,300 ft), (1981–2010)
Month	Jan	Feb	Mar	Apr	May	Jun	Jul	Aug	Sep	Oct	Nov	Dec	Year
Mean daily maximum °C (°F)	24.2 (75.6)	24.3 (75.7)	24.0 (75.2)	23.4 (74.1)	23.2 (73.8)	23.1 (73.6)	23.2 (73.8)	23.8 (74.8)	23.8 (74.8)	23.6 (74.5)	23.5 (74.3)	24.0 (75.2)	23.7 (74.7)
Daily mean °C (°F)	18.8 (65.8)	19.0 (66.2)	18.9 (66.0)	18.8 (65.8)	18.7 (65.7)	18.7 (65.7)	18.6 (65.5)	19.0 (66.2)	18.9 (66.0)	18.6 (65.5)	18.6 (65.5)	18.7 (65.7)	18.8 (65.8)
Mean daily minimum °C (°F)	13.5 (56.3)	13.8 (56.8)	13.9 (57.0)	14.2 (57.6)	14.2 (57.6)	14.0 (57.2)	13.8 (56.8)	13.9 (57.0)	13.9 (57.0)	13.9 (57.0)	13.8 (56.8)	13.6 (56.5)	13.9 (57.0)
Average precipitation mm (inches)	51.8 (2.04)	66.9 (2.63)	101.8 (4.01)	150.2 (5.91)	183.1 (7.21)	135.4 (5.33)	107.7 (4.24)	91.3 (3.59)	128.7 (5.07)	124.2 (4.89)	99.4 (3.91)	73.5 (2.89)	1,314.1 (51.74)
Average precipitation days	13	13	16	21	22	17	15	14	17	20	18	15	199
Average relative humidity (%)	79	79	80	81	82	81	80	78	78	80	81	80	80
Mean monthly sunshine hours	161.2	138.3	136.4	114.0	124.0	123.0	136.4	133.3	129.0	130.2	129.0	148.8	1,603.6
Mean daily sunshine hours	5.2	4.9	4.4	3.8	4.0	4.1	4.4	4.3	4.3	4.2	4.3	4.8	4.4
Source: Instituto de Hidrologia Meteorologia y Estudios Ambientales
