= Montelíbano =

- Municipality and town
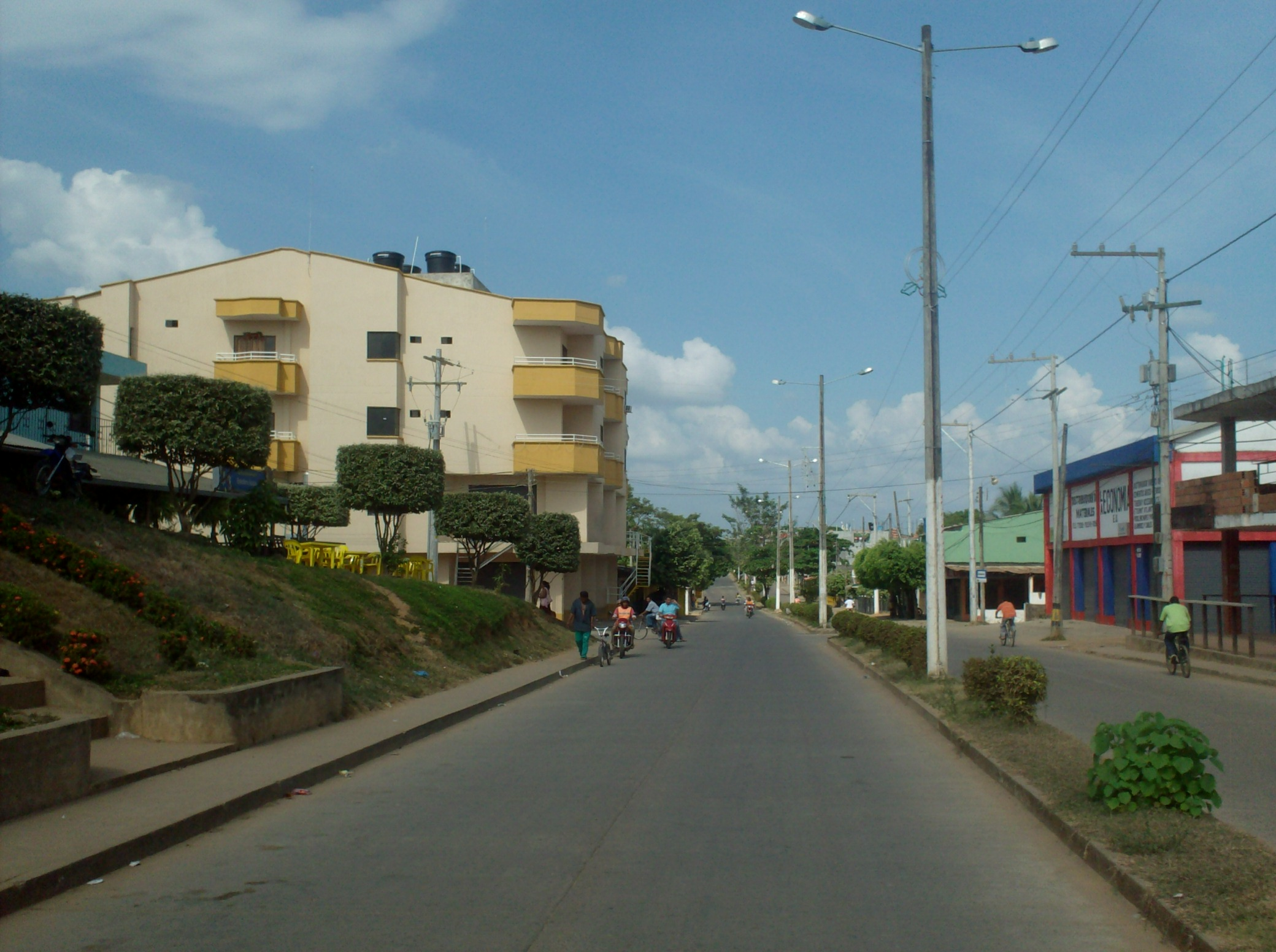

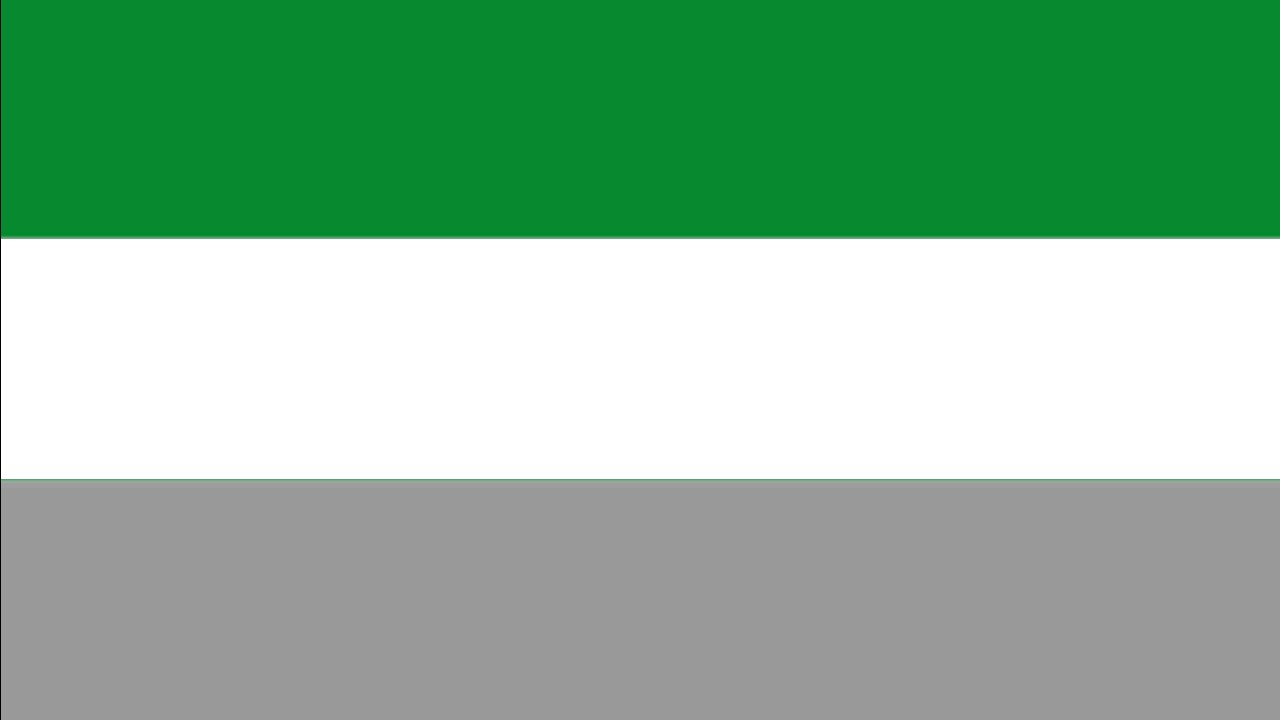
- Flag Coat of arms

- Location of the municipality and town of Montelíbano in the Córdoba Department of Colombia.

- Location in Colombia
- Coordinates: 7°58′30″N 75°25′15″W
- Country: Colombia
- Department: Córdoba Department
- Founded: 1907

Government
  - Mayor: José David Cura

Area
  - Municipality and town: 1,551 km^{2} (599 sq mi)
  - Urban: 11.08 km^{2} (4.28 sq mi)
- Elevation: 44 m (144 ft)

Population (2020 est.)
  - Municipality and town: 90,450
  - Density: 58.32/km^{2} (151.0/sq mi)
  - Urban: 63,689
  - Urban density: 5,748/km^{2} (14,890/sq mi)
- Demonym: Montelíbanés
- Time zone: UTC-5 (Colombia Standard Time)
- Postal code: 234001
- Area code: 57 + 4
- Website: Official website (in Spanish)

Montelíbano is a town and municipality located in the Córdoba Department of Colombia. It is the seat of the Roman Catholic Diocese of Montelíbano.

Montelíbano is host of one of the largest ferronickel mines, the Cerro Matoso mine. The Company Cerro Matoso S.A. operates the mine site, as well as the associated smelter.

According to 2020 estimates, the population of Montelíbano was 90,450, with a population density of 58 persons per square kilometer.

== Climate ==
Climate data for Montelíbano (Cuba Hda), elevation 50 m (160 ft), (1981–2010)
Month	Jan	Feb	Mar	Apr	May	Jun	Jul	Aug	Sep	Oct	Nov	Dec	Year
Mean daily maximum °C (°F)	33.5 (92.3)	33.7 (92.7)	33.8 (92.8)	33.6 (92.5)	33.1 (91.6)	32.8 (91.0)	32.7 (90.9)	32.7 (90.9)	32.7 (90.9)	32.6 (90.7)	32.6 (90.7)	32.8 (91.0)	33.0 (91.4)
Daily mean °C (°F)	27.3 (81.1)	27.5 (81.5)	27.6 (81.7)	27.5 (81.5)	27.3 (81.1)	27.2 (81.0)	27.1 (80.8)	27.1 (80.8)	27.0 (80.6)	27.0 (80.6)	27.0 (80.6)	27.2 (81.0)	27.2 (81.0)
Mean daily minimum °C (°F)	22.3 (72.1)	22.3 (72.1)	22.7 (72.9)	22.9 (73.2)	22.6 (72.7)	22.4 (72.3)	22.5 (72.5)	22.4 (72.3)	22.4 (72.3)	22.6 (72.7)	22.8 (73.0)	22.5 (72.5)	22.5 (72.5)
Average precipitation mm (inches)	14.9 (0.59)	32.8 (1.29)	63.0 (2.48)	173.8 (6.84)	305.0 (12.01)	326.7 (12.86)	359.5 (14.15)	385.6 (15.18)	335.8 (13.22)	292.0 (11.50)	180.5 (7.11)	62.3 (2.45)	2,531.9 (99.68)
Average precipitation days	2	3	5	10	16	15	17	17	16	16	11	6	129
Average relative humidity (%)	86	85	84	85	86	86	87	87	87	87	88	88	86
Source: Instituto de Hidrologia Meteorologia y Estudios Ambientales
