= Riosucio, Chocó =

Riosucio
- Municipality and town
- Flag Coat of arms

- Location of the municipality and town of Riosucio in the Chocó Department of Colombia.
- Coordinates: 7.4406°0′0″N 77.1189°0′0″W
- Country: Colombia
- Department: Chocó Department
- Founded: 1518

Area
  - Municipality and town: 5,818.5 km^{2} (2,246.5 sq mi)
- Elevation: 8 m (26 ft)

Population (2015)
  - Municipality and town: 28,832
  - Density: 4.95/km^{2} (12.8/sq mi)
  - Metro: 8,458
- Time zone: UTC-5 (Colombia Standard Time)

Riosucio (Spanish pronunciation: [rjoˈsusjo]) is a municipality and town in the Department of Chocó, Colombia. The municipality and town are located in the Atrato River basin, on the Chocoan side of Urabá, a region spanning the departments Chocó and Antioquia.

Riosucio municipality is landlocked, being separated from the Pacific Ocean by the Chocoan municipalities Juradó and Bahía Solano and from the Gulf of Urabá, a large inlet of the Caribbean Sea, by the Antioquian municipality Turbo and the Chocoan municipality Unguía. Riosucio town is mostly inaccessible by roads and has no airport; the river is the main route for access to and transportation within the town.

== History ==
Before the Spanish arrival in the region now known as Chocó, the region was populated by indigenous Emberá and Katío communities. Spanish exploration began in 1501, with Rodrigo de Bastidas, Vasco Núñez de Balboa, and Juan de la Cosa making the first efforts. There are no exact data on the foundation of Riosucio, but it could have occurred between 1518 and 1524, after Vasco Núñez de Balboa's second trip to the Atrato River. Although Spanish invaders tried to gain control of the area, the indigenous population kept them away until the 18th century, when an increase in trade and the region's presence along potential north–south trade routes made the region again of interest to colonizers.

The municipality and town are named Riosucio (in English "Dirty River") after the river of that name that joins the Atrato River. The town was founded by the Spaniard Domingo Bailon.

In 1996, the town was the target of a violent operation of the Colombian military along with paramilitary groups, in response to organizing by Afro-Colombians and the subsequent law granting land rights to residents of Riosucio and other nearby towns. Hundreds were killed, many disappeared, and over 22,000 survivors were forced to leave their lands and move to poor neighborhoods of big cities around the country.

== Geography ==
Riosucio municipality is bordered by the country of Panama to the municipality's northwest and around a small northward-extending portion of its territory, by the Chocoan municipality Unguía along the northernmost part of Riosucio's northeastern border, by the Antioquian municipalities Turbo and Mutatá along the central and southern parts of Riosucio's northeastern border, by the Antioquian municipality Dabeiba on the southeastern side of Riosucio's eastern tip, by the Chocoan municipality Carmen del Darien along most of an irregular border running roughly east-to-west in its eastern portion and northeast-to-southwest in its western portion, by the Chocoan municipality Bahía Solano for a small distance along Riosucio's southern tip, and by the Chocoan municipality Juradó along the remainder of Riosucio's southern tip and along all of Riosucio's western border except the small northern portion shared with Panama.

The municipality is rather forested and is located at the northern part of the department of Chocó in a region called "Lower Chocoan Atrato-Urabá" (Bajo Atrato-Urabá Chocoano). This region is crossed by the Atrato, one of Colombia's main rivers, which is joined by tributaries including Rio Sucio and the Salaquí and Truandó rivers. The municipality does not have an airport; although a forest road connects it with Chigorodó and Mutatá in Antioquia and with Belén de Bajirá in a region disputed between Antioquia and Chocó, the road is undeveloped. The Atrato provides access southward (upriver) to the department capital Quibdó and northward (downriver) to the Gulf of Urabá and its port Turbo.

=== Climate ===
Riosucio has a tropical monsoon climate with heavy rainfall in all months except January and February.

Climate data for Riosucio (Teresita La), elevation 50 m (160 ft), (1971–2000)
Month	Jan	Feb	Mar	Apr	May	Jun	Jul	Aug	Sep	Oct	Nov	Dec	Year
Mean daily maximum °C (°F)	31.2 (88.2)	31.6 (88.9)	31.0 (87.8)	31.1 (88.0)	30.9 (87.6)	30.7 (87.3)	30.9 (87.6)	30.5 (86.9)	30.4 (86.7)	30.2 (86.4)	30.1 (86.2)	30.3 (86.5)	30.7 (87.3)
Daily mean °C (°F)	26.2 (79.2)	26.4 (79.5)	26.5 (79.7)	26.6 (79.9)	26.2 (79.2)	26.2 (79.2)	26.1 (79.0)	26.0 (78.8)	25.9 (78.6)	25.7 (78.3)	25.7 (78.3)	26.0 (78.8)	26.1 (79.0)
Mean daily minimum °C (°F)	22.0 (71.6)	22.1 (71.8)	22.3 (72.1)	22.8 (73.0)	22.9 (73.2)	22.8 (73.0)	22.6 (72.7)	22.5 (72.5)	22.5 (72.5)	22.3 (72.1)	22.6 (72.7)	22.4 (72.3)	22.5 (72.5)
Average precipitation mm (inches)	60.4 (2.38)	73.1 (2.88)	85.2 (3.35)	217.3 (8.56)	295.8 (11.65)	254.2 (10.01)	285.6 (11.24)	287.6 (11.32)	234.9 (9.25)	293.2 (11.54)	243.3 (9.58)	151.0 (5.94)	2,481.6 (97.70)
Average precipitation days	8	7	9	16	24	23	25	25	23	24	22	15	220
Average relative humidity (%)	85	84	84	85	88	88	87	87	88	89	89	88	87
Mean monthly sunshine hours	117.8	118.7	111.6	93.0	99.2	81.0	108.5	93.0	93.0	77.5	90.0	96.1	1,179.4
Mean daily sunshine hours	3.8	4.2	3.6	3.1	3.2	2.7	3.5	3.0	3.1	2.5	3.0	3.1	3.2
Source: Instituto de Hidrologia Meteorologia y Estudios Ambientales

== Economy ==
Located in a forest region of Darien, Riosucio is dedicated to wood exploitation, agriculture, and cattle husbandry. The African palm is one of the area's main economic products.

Although the tourist industry is not well developed in the area due to lack of infrastructure and of general security, areas that attract tourist interest exist and include:

- Los Katíos National Park, a territory that is shared with Panama and that was declared a World Heritage Site in 1994 by UNESCO: The park protects not only a rich and fascinating natural environment with unique animal and plant species but also the ancestral culture of Katíos and other indigenous peoples of the area.
- The Afro-American and Indo-American rural communities of the region around the river and the sea, whose ancestral traditions and natural environment attract tourist attention

== Culture ==
The region is populated mainly by Afro-Colombian communities and by indigenous communities whose ancestral groups include but are not limited to the Katíos and the Emberás. Their food, feasts, religiosity and traditions are influenced by their identity. The Spanish language is the lingua franca, but several languages and language varieties are in use, especially among indigenous groups. Afro-Colombian groups have maintained the use of many African words and expressions but have also adopted loanwords from indigenous languages. The culture belongs to the river, and the region's music and dances are influenced by both African and indigenous cultural elements.

The main feasts in the municipalities are the Sweet Festival during Holy Week, the feast of Saint Isidore the Laborer in May, and the Carnival of Our Lady of Mount Carmel from the 6th to the 16th of July.

== Notable people ==
- Luis Enrique Mena (born 1992), Colombian footballer
