= 1992 Murindó earthquake =

Earthquake in Colombia

- Location within Colombia
- UTC time: 1992-10-18 15:11:59
- ISC event: 268025
- 268313
- USGS-ANSS: ComCat
- ComCat
- Local time: 03:32
- 10:11
- Magnitude: 7.2 M_{wb}
- Depth: 10.0 km (6.2 mi)
- Epicenter: 7.075°N 76.862°W
- Type: Strike-slip
- Areas affected: Colombia
- Max. intensity: MMI X (Extreme) MSK-64 X (Devastating) XI (ESI 2007)
- Foreshocks: 6.7 M_{w}
- Casualties: 10 dead, 115 injured

The 1992 Murindó earthquake (also known as the Atrato earthquake) occurred on October 18 at 15:11 UTC (10:11 a.m. local time) with an epicenter in the Department of Chocó, northern Colombia. The shallow magnitude 7.2 earthquake struck northwest of the town of Murindó, killing ten and injured more than a hundred. Thirty-three municipalities were severely damaged.

The preferred focal mechanism of this earthquake is highly debated with either thrust, reverse, or left-lateral strike-slip.

== Tectonic setting ==
Subduction of the Nazca plate beneath the North Andes plate (part of the South American plate) occasionally produces moderately large to great earthquakes along the coast of Colombia. The megathrust fault forms the northern part of the Peru–Chile Trench, which has been the source of very large earthquakes including the 1906 Ecuador–Colombia earthquake; the magnitude 8.8 is the biggest in the region and the 6th largest earthquake to be instrumentally recorded.

== Earthquake ==
From the earthquake's depth and proximity to the trench, this was not a subduction-related earthquake.

On October 17, a magnitude 6.7 foreshock struck between Murindó and Opogodó 31 hours before the mainshock. Its focal mechanism was of reverse origin. It ruptured along a thrust or reverse fault for 50 km. Because of its size and rupture length, this quake could be considered an independent mainshock.

The earthquake of October 18 was slightly more complex, consisting of two events separated by a time gap of 12 seconds. Two focal mechanisms were discovered during the mainshock thrust and strike-slip, which meant that there was a transition of faulting. This quake ruptured a 90 km section of the fault. A third event 100 seconds later could be part of the mainshock sequence. It is believed that this earthquake was a result of slippage along the Murindó Fault, a left-lateral strike-slip fault, and other smaller structures. No surface rupture was ever mentioned in reports.

== Effects ==
=== Foreshock ===
A maximum intensity of VIII (Severe) was assigned to the magnitude 6.7 earthquake, and was felt in Murindó. It caused no deaths but 20 people were injured, and nearly all the buildings in the town were destroyed. It caused cracks to appear near rivers and liquefaction in the affected area.

=== Mainshock ===
The mainshock was much more severe, reaching X on the Modified Mercalli and MSK intensity scale. It was reassessed in the early 21st century based on its environmental effects and was assigned XI on the Environmental Seismic Intensity scale. The original intensity was mis-assigned likely due to the lack of buildings and underdevelopment in the affected region. In Murindó and the Atrato Valley, shaking intensity was IX (Violent), accounting for most of the damage to human settlements.

Most of the affected areas were on low-relief terrain, with small hills that form the eastern part of the North Andes. These low hills were stripped of vegetation from landslides, covering an area of 480 km^{2}. Between 30 and 40% of the vegetation in the area was gone. Slope failures were also seen along riverbanks of the Atrato and Murindo rivers. Small slides were also seen in the city of Medellin.

Many of the liquefaction cases were sand ejection from lateral-spreading. These phenomenons caused subsidence in some areas measured at 1.5 meters. Villages near riverbanks were affected because blocks of land were sliding into the rivers, turning them muddy.

A mud volcano in San Pedro de Uraba ejected 50,000 m^{3} of material, and exploded in a fiery ignition of gases, killing seven and injuring 20 while another at San Juan de Uraba emerged from the sea, creating Damaquiel Island near the coast.

The death toll was relatively low because most of the residents had fled the town damaged by the foreshock. One child was killed after a school wall collapsed in Vigia del Fuerte. Further away in Bogota, five buildings were evacuated for fear that they would collapse. Rescue and recovery efforts were hampered as the only road leading to the affected region was buried under a landslide. Floods swept the affected towns after water overflowed from an earthquake lake on the Atrato River. The total damage from the foreshock and mainshock amounted to more than US$100 million.

== See also ==
- List of earthquakes in Colombia
