= Murindó Fault =

- Falla Murindó
- Location within Colombia
- Etymology: Murindó
- Coordinates: 06°45′55″N 76°39′12″W
- Country: Colombia
- Region: Pacific/Chocó
- State: Antioquia, Chocó
- Cities: Dabeiba

Characteristics
- Range: Chocó Basin, Western Ranges, Andes
- Part of: Andean strike-slip faults
- Length: 60.6 km (37.7 mi)
- Strike: 347.4 ± 6
- Dip: East
- Dip angle: High
- Displacement: 0.2–1 mm (0.0079–0.0394 in)/yr

Tectonics
- Plate: North Andean
- Status: Active
- Earthquakes: 18 October 1992 (M_{W} 7.3)
- Type: Strike-slip fault
- Movement: Sinistral
- Age: Quaternary
- Orogeny: Andean

The Murindó Fault (Spanish: Falla Murindó) is a strike-slip fault in the department of Antioquia and Chocó in northwestern Colombia. The fault has a total length of 60.6 kilometres (37.7 mi) and runs along an average north-northwest to south-southeast strike of 347.4 ± 6 in the Chocó Basin along the western edge of the Western Ranges of the Colombian Andes.

== Etymology ==
The fault is named after Murindó.

== Description ==
The fault in the Chocó Basin extends along the western slope of the Western Ranges of the Colombian Andes, from the Arquia River in the south to the Río Sucio and the basin of the Atrato River in the north. The Murindó Fault places Cretaceous volcanic (basic) rocks against Tertiary turbidites, and crosscuts Tertiary quartz-diorite and granodiorite. The Murindó River flows along the Murindó Fault near Murindó. The fault underlies the municipalities of Dabeiba and Frontino. To the south, the fault runs parallel to the Mutatá and Encarnación Faults.

In the southernmost part, the fault shows evidence of tectonic control of streams. It also forms aligned saddles that face toward the mountain front. The fault is active with an approximate slip rate of 0.2 to 1 millimetre (0.0079 to 0.0394 in) per year, and caused the 1992 Murindó earthquake (M_{W} 7.3) on October 18. A foreshock of 6.7 was registered the day before. Many earthquakes that occurred since 1883 in the region are associated with the Murindó Fault.

== See also ==
- List of earthquakes in Colombia
- Unguía Fault
- Romeral Fault System
