= Acandí =

Coordinates: 8°32′N 77°14′W

- Municipality and town
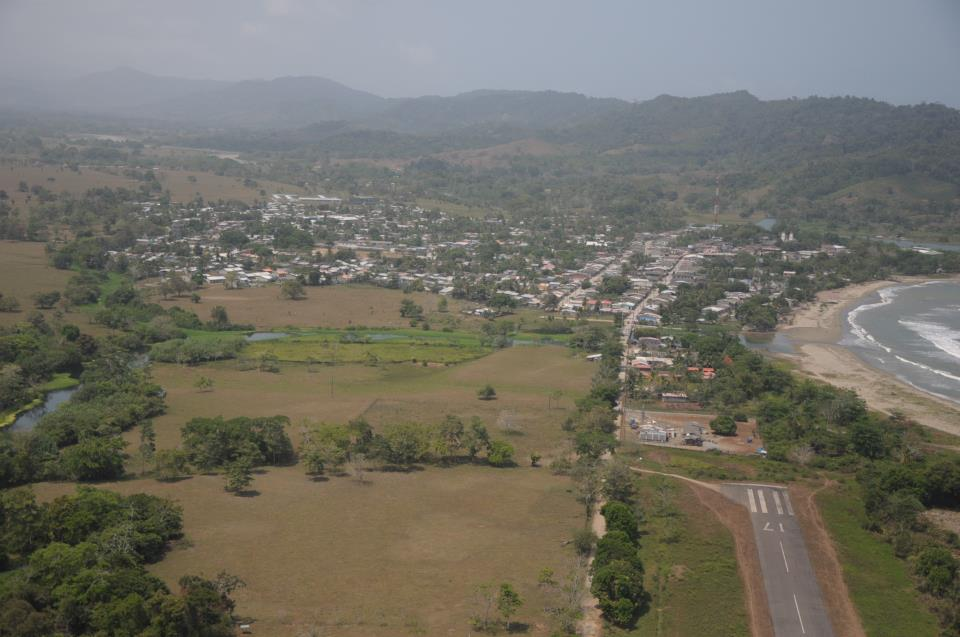

- Flag Coat of arms

- Location of the municipality and town of Acandí in the Chocó Department of Colombia
- Country: Colombia
- Department: Chocó Department

Area
  - Municipality and town: 869 km^{2} (336 sq mi)

Population (Census 2018)
  - Municipality and town: 14.159
  - Density: 16.29/km^{2} (42.2/sq mi)
  - Urban: 46%
- Time zone: UTC-5 (Colombia Standard Time)

Acandí is a town in Colombia at the northern extremity of the department of Chocó in the northwest of Colombia, bordering Panama and the Caribbean Sea. It is 366 km (227 mi) from the department's capital, Quibdó. Its average temperature is 28 degrees Celsius (82 °F). It was founded around 1887, and it became a municipality in 1905, previously being part of Turbo. The name "Acandí" is a corruption of the indigenous word "Acanti", which means "River of Stone".

It is one of the constituent territories of the region of Darién, together with the towns of Unguía, Juradó and the municipality of Riosucio west of the Atrato River. About 87% of the population are Afro-Colombians, Blacks and Mulato, and the poverty index was estimated at 51 in 2018.

Acandí has no road connection with the outside world. It is only about 5 miles (8 km.) from the Panama border. There is a ferry connecting it with Necoclí, some 35 miles (56 km) east across the Gulf of Urabá, from which there is a paved road south. This is the route for everything in Acandí that does not arrive by air. In the years leading up to the Haitian migrant crisis of 2021, these ferries, running at capacity, were primarily transporting Haitians, who were about to enter the Panamanian Darién Gap en route to the United States.

== History ==
The name Acandí is derived from the Acandí tribe which means "River of Stones". The first the town of Acandí was founded in c. 1890 by Spanish settlers Concepción Gómez, Fermín Ávila, José Piestán, José Garrido and others with the name of San Nicolás de Titumate and was located at the western shore of the Acandí River but was constantly flooded and devastated by this river. The inhabitants moved the village to its current safer location in 1896.

The municipality of Acandí was created on August 5, 1908, by an ordinance of the same year.

== Geography ==
Its urban area is by the Caribbean Sea in the northeastern part of the Gulf of Urabá, some 558 km (347 mi) away from the capital Quibdó. The municipality has an area of 869 km^{2} (336 sq mi) and borders to the north with the Caribbean Sea, to the south with the municipality of Unguía and to the west with the Republic of Panama.

== Climate ==
Acandí has a wet tropical rainforest climate (Köppen Af).

Climate data for Acandí
Month	Jan	Feb	Mar	Apr	May	Jun	Jul	Aug	Sep	Oct	Nov	Dec	Year
Mean daily maximum °C (°F)	29.8 (85.6)	30.1 (86.2)	30.1 (86.2)	30.2 (86.4)	30.1 (86.2)	30.0 (86.0)	29.8 (85.6)	29.6 (85.3)	29.7 (85.5)	29.3 (84.7)	29.3 (84.7)	29.9 (85.8)	29.8 (85.7)
Daily mean °C (°F)	26.0 (78.8)	26.2 (79.2)	26.5 (79.7)	26.6 (79.9)	26.4 (79.5)	26.3 (79.3)	26.2 (79.2)	26.0 (78.8)	25.9 (78.6)	25.8 (78.4)	25.8 (78.4)	25.9 (78.6)	26.1 (79.0)
Mean daily minimum °C (°F)	22.3 (72.1)	22.3 (72.1)	22.9 (73.2)	23.0 (73.4)	22.8 (73.0)	22.6 (72.7)	22.7 (72.9)	22.4 (72.3)	22.1 (71.8)	22.3 (72.1)	22.4 (72.3)	22.0 (71.6)	22.5 (72.5)
Average rainfall mm (inches)	131.9 (5.19)	84.1 (3.31)	119.8 (4.72)	287.1 (11.30)	376.4 (14.82)	268.3 (10.56)	296.1 (11.66)	283.3 (11.15)	201.0 (7.91)	226.7 (8.93)	268.6 (10.57)	281.5 (11.08)	2,824.8 (111.2)
Average rainy days	9	7	8	14	18	17	18	17	14	15	16	14	167
Source 1: Instituto de Hidrología, Meteorología y Estudios Ambientales
Source 2:

== Economy ==
The main economic activities of Acandí inters of Added value are Mining (41%), agriculture, livestock, hunting, forestry and fishing (35%), manufacturing (15%) and commerce repairs and hospitality (5%). The main agricultural products are maize, plantain and yuca. The municipality also covers the tourism hub Capurganá, located near the border with Panama.

== Transportation ==
Acandí has a small seaport on the Caribbean Sea mainly utilizing it to communicate with other nearby ports in Colombia and Panama. The Atrato River is also used for transportation and a way to reach the Departmental capital Quibdó. The town also has a small airport, Alcides Fernández Airport (Airport class G. 1,200 m long, 10 m wide) that can receive light planes and is used primarily to fly to Quibdó or towns in the Antioquia Department. It is owned by the Colombian government agency INCORA.

Inhabitants also use the nearby airfields in Capurganá:

- Capurganá Airport – Airport class F, in the police inspection of Capurganá. 852 m long, 12 m wide. Operated by the municipality.
- El Gilcal Airport – Airport class G, 500 m long, 15 m wide. Owned by the municipality.
