= Capurganá =

Tourist destination of Colombia

- Populated center
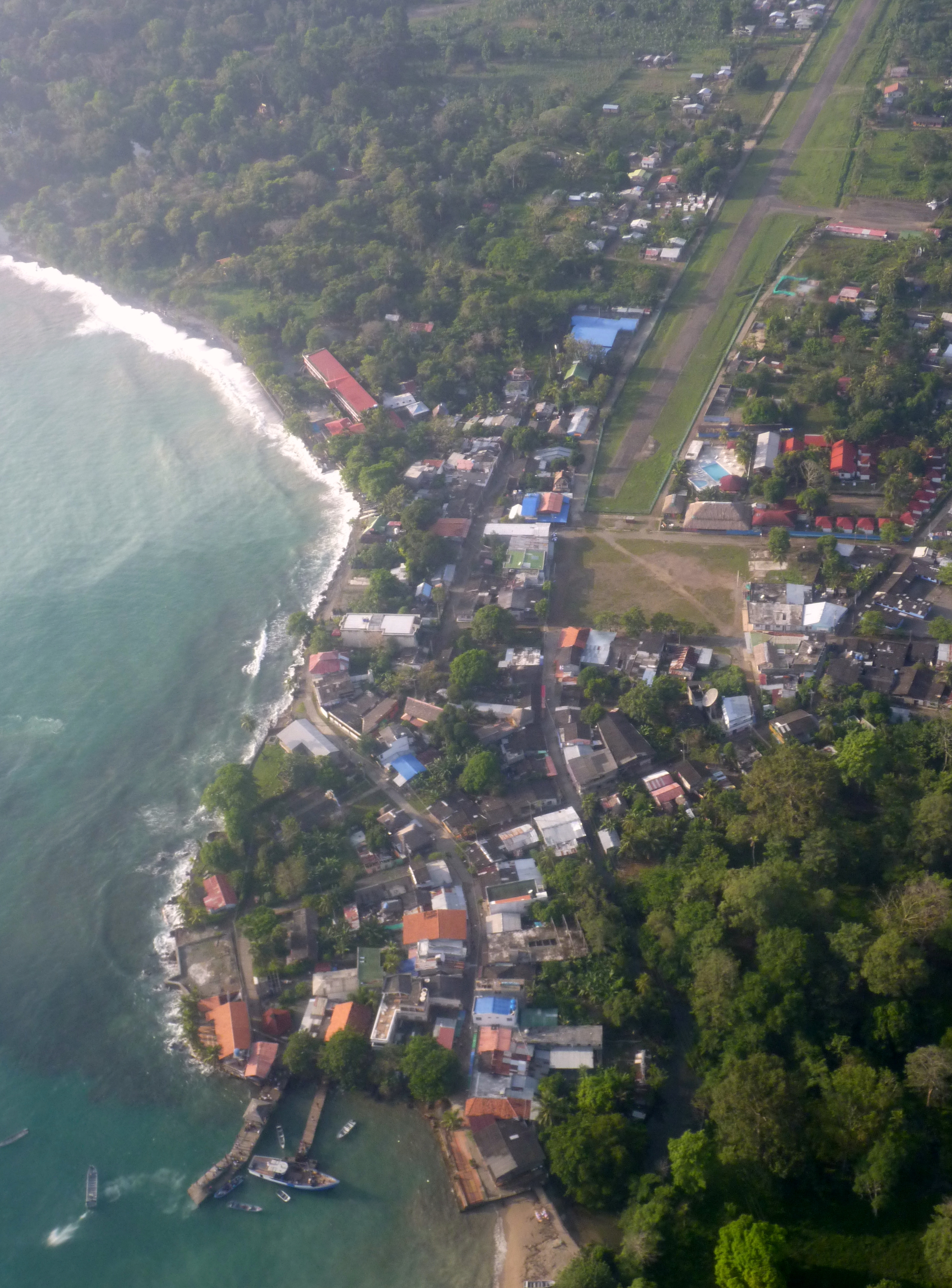
- Aerial view of Capurganá

- Location within Colombia
- Country: Colombia
- Department: Chocó
- Municipality: Acandí
- Founded: 1856
- Elevation: 2 m (6.6 ft)

Population
  - Total: 1,800

Capurganá is a populated center of Colombia of the municipality of Acandí on the northwestern coast of the Gulf of Urabá in the Colombian department of Chocó, adjacent to the border between Colombia and Panama. Previously a base site for eco-tourists, since 2010 the town's main source of income has been migrants preparing to hike into Panama, across the Darién Gap. In 2019 it was described as a "smugglers' town".

== History ==
This region of Colombia was inhabited by the Guna people and the name Capurganá translates to the "land of chili" in their language. The Guna inhabited the area until the early twentieth century when they were displaced by mostly mulatto settlers from Cartagena. The natives migrated to the archipelago of San Blas (Region Kuna Yala) in the neighboring country of Panama. The Guna maintain a semiautonomous region where they exercise a degree of self governance.

Capurganá remained unnoticed on the map until the 1970s when Mrs. Narcisa Navas, a community leader, convinced her neighbours to donate land and help to build a small airstrip. Narcisa Navas and the pilot, Jorge Mario Uribe, took the first tourists to Capurganá in a small Cessna aircraft. Today the Capurganá Airport remains, although there are no scheduled flights. Most tourists arrive by ferry from Necoclí.

Initially families from neighbouring Antioquia Department arrived to build small summer houses: the Mora, Uribe, Arango, and Isaza families, as well as Samuel Isaacs, a relative of the Colombian writer Don Jorge Isaacs. The Palacio family established the first hotel in 1975, small log cabins and an iraca palm roof (Carludovica palmata). After the cabins (now the renewed Tacarcuna Lodge) were established, similar hotels followed, such as the Almar and Calypso. Tourist infrastructure had grown to more than 20 hotels, inns and hostels by 1990. The small town, with no paved streets and no cars, gradually became a destination for the emerging Colombian eco-tourists.

As of 2021, Capurganá has public electricity and water systems, telephones connected to the Colombian phone network, and a permanent doctor. There are no banking facilities and no cars, though motorcycle taxis are available.

== Migrants about to cross Darién ==
Since about 2010 the town's main industry is housing, provisioning, and guiding the many thousands of migrants, primarily Haitians but also from Cameroon, Nepal, Bangladesh, and other countries. In Capurganá they conclude their preparations and provisioning for the arduous hike to Panamá through the jungle of the Darién Gap. Since end of 2024, the migrants are not crossing anymore from Capurgana, they are using other routes.

== Diving ==
Although Colombia has a very extensive coastline in the Caribbean Sea, many coastal waters are turbid due to sediment from large rivers that flow into the sea. One exception is the short length of 30 km that starts from the border with Panamá (Cape Tiburón) to the Acandí municipality. This stretch of coastline is bathed by crystal clear waters suitable for scuba diving and snorkeling. Beyond the Acandí Township, and bordering half of the Caribbean Colombian coast to the archipelago of San Bernardo in the Gulf of Morrosquillo, the sea is dark by the action of the mighty Atrato River and Sinú River.

The best time for diving is in the middle of the winter season from April to November when the waves practically disappear. During the summer from January to March the wave action becomes intense, making navigation difficult and not appropriate for tourists unaccustomed to sea life. Capurganá dive operators have certified PADI international agencies that highlight that work to international standards.

== Biodiversity ==
The Choco department has many different animal species, some endangered. Local boats visit "The Playona" beach where Cana (Dermochelys coriacea) and Carey (Eretmochelys imbricata) turtles nest during the months of March and April. It is also possible to observe the famous Choco poison frogs. The dark green frog, Dendrobates auratus, is also common in the region.

== Tourism ==
The late twentieth century was a golden age of tourism in Capurganá. Thousands of tourists traveled from several Colombian cities for its natural environment. The increased activities of illegal armed groups impacted tourist numbers. On December 12 of 1999 Capurganá was the victim of a guerrilla attack that ended the tourist flow for several years. The Colombian government eventually established a permanent military presence in the border area with the help of the United States Plan Colombia. Increased security also ended the "cajeteros" or arms smugglers who used the airport as its hub.

Until mid-1980 the area had two contiguous coral sand beaches visited by tourists. The beach of the Virgin of Uvita was subsequently invaded by the sea by removing all the sand exposing the coral cliff. Today only the beach of "La Caleta" remains.

Today many tourists and businessmen traveling between Colombia and Panama use the Turbo-Capurganá route. A boat leaves at 8:00 am daily with a capacity of 25 passengers between Turbo (Antioquia) and Capurganá. The trip takes about 2 to 3 hours depending on sea conditions. It was announced that by the end of 2012 a new Catamaran ferry service will run between the Antonio Roldán Airport (Apartadó Town) and Capurganá.

The nearest city of Panama is Puerto Obaldía, about 45 minutes by boat.

== Transport ==
Currently all transport of goods is by sea from Turbo (Colombia) and Cartagena (Colombia). Most visitors arrive by boat, primarily from Necoclí, the closest point with a paved road, from which there are regular ferries. In 2021 the ferries were inadequate to transport the quantities of migrants, whose accumulation led to the collapse of the water system in Necoclí and the mayor proclaiming a state of emergency.

Tourists with means can fly via chartered plane (air taxi) to Capurganá or to the nearby town of Acandí.

== Geography ==
=== Climate ===
Capurgana has a Köppen Climate Classification subtype of "Aw". (Tropical Savanna Climate). The average temperature for the year in Turbo is 81.0 °F (27.2 °C). The warmest month, on average, is May with an average temperature of 82.0 °F (27.8 °C). The coolest month on average is January, with an average temperature of 80.0 °F (26.7 °C).

Climate data for Capurganá, Colombia
Month	Jan	Feb	Mar	Apr	May	Jun	Jul	Aug	Sep	Oct	Nov	Dec	Year
Mean daily maximum °C (°F)	29 (84)	29 (84)	29 (84)	29 (85)	29 (85)	29 (85)	29 (85)	29 (84)	29 (84)	29 (84)	29 (85)	29 (84)	29 (84)
Mean daily minimum °C (°F)	24 (76)	24 (76)	25 (77)	25 (77)	25 (77)	25 (77)	25 (77)	25 (77)	24 (76)	24 (76)	24 (76)	25 (77)	25 (77)
Average precipitation cm (inches)	7.6 (3)	7.6 (3)	7.6 (3)	13 (5)	20 (8)	15 (6)	10 (4)	18 (7)	15 (6)	15 (6)	13 (5)	10 (4)	150 (60)
Source: Weatherbase
