= Murrí Fault =

- Falla Murrí
- Location within Colombia
- Etymology: Murrí River
- Coordinates: 06°41′21″N 76°22′11″W
- Country: Colombia
- Region: Andean
- State: Antioquia

Characteristics
- Range: Central Ranges, Andes
- Part of: Andean oblique faults
- Length: 87.1 km (54.1 mi)
- Strike: 001.4 ± 5
- Dip: unknown
- Dip angle: unknown
- Displacement: 0.2–1 mm (0.0079–0.0394 in)/yr

Tectonics
- Plate: North Andean
- Status: Inactive
- Type: Oblique thrust fault
- Movement: Reverse sinistral
- Age: Quaternary
- Orogeny: Andean

The Murrí Fault (Spanish: Falla Murrí) is an oblique thrust fault in the department of Antioquia in northwestern Colombia. The fault has a total length of 87.1 kilometres (54.1 mi) and runs along an average north–south strike of 001.4 ± 5 along the Central Ranges of the Colombian Andes.

== Etymology ==
The fault is named after the Murrí River in Antioquia.

== Description ==
Located in the western limb of the Western Ranges of the Colombian Andes. The fault puts Cretaceous mafic igneous rocks to the east in contact with Tertiary marine sedimentary rocks to the west. The fault cuts mud flows dated at about 10,000 to 15,000 years. It causes strong lineaments and offsets terraces and alluvial deposits. The fault forms well-developed scarps of about 20 metres (66 ft) high on late Quaternary alluvial deposits.

The fault forms the course of the Penderisco River and cuts perpendicular to the Ocaidó Valley. Some authors consider the fault the southern part of the Murrí-Mutatá Fault.

== See also ==
- List of earthquakes in Colombia
- Murindó Fault
- Romeral Fault System
