= Mutatá Fault =

Colombian strike-slip fault

- Falla Mutatá
- Location within Colombia
- Etymology: Mutatá
- Coordinates: 07°17′45″N 76°28′40″W
- Country: Colombia
- Region: Caribbean
- State: Antioquia
- Cities: Mutatá

Characteristics
- Range: Urabá Basin
- Part of: Andean thrust faults
- Length: 44.7 km (27.8 mi)
- Strike: 326.4 ± 11
- Dip: East
- Dip angle: Probably medium to high
- Displacement: 0.2–1 mm (0.0079–0.0394 in)/yr

Tectonics
- Plate: North Andean
- Status: Active
- Earthquakes: 2016 Mutatá (M_{w} 6.0); 7 September 1882 Turbo (X) (possibly)
- Type: Thrust fault
- Movement: Oblique sinistral reverse
- Age: Quaternary
- Orogeny: Andean

The Mutatá Fault (Spanish: Falla Mutatá) is a strike-slip fault named after Mutatá in the department of Antioquia in northern Colombia. The fault has a total length of 44.7 kilometres (27.8 mi) and runs along an average northwest to southeast strike of 326.4 ± 11 in the Urabá Basin. The fault is active and produced the 2016 Mutatá earthquake with a moment magnitude of 6.0.

== Description ==
The Mutatá Fault is located in northwestern Colombia, between the Penderisco River and the Caribbean Sea. To the south, near the town of Mutatá, the Mutatá Fault approaches the Murrí Fault and the two fault zones practically merge. In this area, the Mutatá Fault places Cretaceous intrusive rocks and greenstones (to the east) in contact with sedimentary Tertiary rocks (to the west). Farther north, the fault cuts Tertiary and Quaternary deposits, with uplift of the eastern block. The Mutatá Fault is located near the junction of the Malpelo, Caribbean, and North Andean Plates. There is an elongate, tectonically depressed zone between the Mutatá and Murrí Faults. The Mutatá Fault has a prominent topographic expression near the town of Mutatá, as seen on SIR-A satellite images. To the north of Río Sucio, the Mutatá Fault shows discontinuous linear valleys, notches, and trenches (grabens). There are aligned hills and slope changes close to the Central Ranges. Fault scarps, sag ponds, and aligned valleys are very common tectonic features along most of the fault's trace.

Some authors consider the fault the northern part of the Murrí-Mutatá Fault.

=== Activity ===
The slip rate has been estimated between 0.2 and 1 millimetre (0.0079 and 0.0394 in) per year and the fault is active, with activity registered to the Late Pleistocene and possibly to the intensity X 7 September 1882 Turbo earthquake. The most recent earthquake associated with the fault was the 2016 Mutatá earthquake (M_{w} 6.0).

== See also ==
- List of earthquakes in Colombia
- Murindó Fault
- Unguía Fault
- Romeral Fault System
