= Unguía Fault =

- Falla Unguía
- Location within Colombia
- Etymology: Unguía
- Coordinates: 08°03′27″N 77°07′23″W
- Country: Colombia; Panama
- Region: Caribbean, Pacific/Chocó
- State: Chocó; Darién

Characteristics
- Range: Serranía del Darién
- Part of: Caribbean faults
- Length: 139.9 km (86.9 mi)
- Strike: 356.3 ± 30
- Dip: West
- Dip angle: Low to moderate
- Displacement: ~0.2–1 mm (0.0079–0.0394 in)/yr

Tectonics
- Plate: Caribbean, North Andean
- Status: Inactive
- Type: Oblique thrust fault
- Movement: Reverse dextral
- Age: Quaternary
- Orogeny: Andean

The Unguía Fault (Spanish: Falla de Unguía) is an oblique dextral thrust fault in the department of Chocó in northwestern Colombia and continuing offshore Panama in the Caribbean Sea. The fault has a total length of 139.9 kilometres (86.9 mi) and is arcuate, running along a strike of 356.3 ± 30.

== Etymology ==
The fault is named after Unguía, Chocó.

== Description ==
The fault is located in the Darién area of northwestern Colombia. It has an irregular arcuate strike, but it has a general north tendency. In Colombia, it has been mapped as far north as the town of Acandí: farther north, it enters the Caribbean Sea, where it parallels the coast of Panama. The Unguía Fault is likely a southern continuation of the eastern section of the Northern Panama deformed belt, where it comes on land in northwestern Colombia.

The fault is prominent on satellite images and topographic maps. The irregular boundary between the Serranía del Darién and the Atrato Valley suggests that the fault is a thrust fault that dips northwest. Along its southern extent, the fault forms a scarp that faces east and is a few tens of meters high. The fault separates alluvium of the Atrato and Tuira Rivers from Tertiary strata. To the northwest, where the fault cuts the base of the Serranía del Darién, the scarp and the contact between the Atrato alluvium and Tertiary rocks are sinuous. To the north of Unguía, the fault strikes north through the Bajo Atrato Valley, probably extending either into the Gulf of Urabá or to the northwest into the Caribbean Sea. The fault underlies the Katíos National Natural Park.

== See also ==
- List of earthquakes in Colombia
- Bahía Solano Fault
