= Riosucio =

Riosucio may refer to:

- Riosucio, Caldas, a town and municipality in Caldas Department, Colombia
- Riosucio, Chocó, a town and municipality in Chocó Department, Colombia
