= Murindó =

- Municipality and town
- Flag

- Location of the municipality and town of Murindó in the Antioquia Department of Colombia

- Location in Colombia
- Coordinates: 6°48′0″N 76°48′0″W
- Country: Colombia
- Department: Antioquia Department
- Subregion: Urabá
- Time zone: UTC-5 (Colombia Standard Time)

Murindó is a Colombian municipality located in the subregion of Urabá in the department of Antioquia. It borders the department of Chocó to the north, the municipalities of Dabeiba and Frontino to the east, the municipality of Vigía del Fuerte to the south, and both the municipality of Vigía del Fuerte and the department of Chocó to the west. It is 310 km away from Medellín, the departmental capital. Murindó spans 1,349 square kilometers and is only 25 meters above sea level. It is a municipality without a public water supply and sewage system; consequently, residents must seek water from nearby rivers and natural pools.

== History ==
To date, the patron saint festivals of Murindó are dedicated to Saint Bartholomew the Apostle, as the first settlement founded there was named San Bartolomé de Murindó. The year officially recognized as the initial founding of the town is 1835, with Don Juan Paulino Salazar considered its founder. The community has undergone several changes in its geographical, political, and administrative condition, leading to other versions indicating that its definitive erection as a municipal district was in 1914.

Located on the banks of the Atrato River, this municipality is nestled in virgin jungle, making it highly attractive for adventure tourism. It is full of rivers suitable for fishing, natural pools, and paths through abundant nature.

Murindó also represents a great cultural wealth, resulting from the presence of mestizos, blacks, and Emberá Katío indigenous people.

== Political & Administrative Division ==
In addition to its municipal headquarter, Murindó has jurisdiction over the following districts (according to the departmental management):

- Bellaluz
- Campoalegre
- Opogadó

General Information

Foundational values: Symbol of overcoming and Welcoming land where no one is a stranger. It is one of the few regions in the country where Catio indigenous reserves remain. It is connected by road to the towns of Bellavista and Vigía del Fuerte. It is a fluvial port on the Murindó River.

Murindó is known as a Synonym of overcoming.

== Demographics ==
Total Population: 4,911 inhabitants (2018)

- Urban Population: 1,760
- Rural Population: 3,151
- Literacy: 58.5% (2005)
  - Urban area: 46.5%
  - Rural area: 53.5% Ethnography According to the figures presented by DANE from the 2005 census, the ethnic composition of the municipality is:
- Blacks (47.8%)
- Indigenous (42.0%)
- Mestizos and whites (10.2%)

== Economy ==
The economy is based primarily on agriculture and fishing. Regarding handicrafts, canoes are carved from wood, as are canaletes, pilones, bateas, and tool handles. Hats, cups, and mats are made from vines, leaves, and fruits.

== Cuisine ==
The community offers very typical dishes that deviate from the standard of traditional Colombian cuisine. Additionally, as the municipality does not belong to the Paisa zone of Antioquia, typical Antioquian dishes are not highlighted. Instead, borojó, chontaduro with salt, and fish prepared in various ways are offered. Other examples include pampa, jenene, tumbo, and birimbi.

== Festivities ==
- Day of Tambeo or the Holy Cross
- Patron saint festivities of Saint Bartholomew the Apostle
- Day of the Matachines.

== Climate ==
Murindó has a tropical rainforest climate (Af) with heavy to very heavy rainfall year-round.

Climate data for Murindó
Month	Jan	Feb	Mar	Apr	May	Jun	Jul	Aug	Sep	Oct	Nov	Dec	Year
Mean daily maximum °C (°F)	30.7 (87.3)	31.0 (87.8)	31.4 (88.5)	31.4 (88.5)	30.0 (86.0)	30.1 (86.2)	30.3 (86.5)	30.2 (86.4)	29.6 (85.3)	29.4 (84.9)	29.6 (85.3)	29.8 (85.6)	30.3 (86.5)
Daily mean °C (°F)	26.6 (79.9)	27.0 (80.6)	27.3 (81.1)	27.4 (81.3)	26.7 (80.1)	26.6 (79.9)	26.7 (80.1)	26.6 (79.9)	26.3 (79.3)	26.1 (79.0)	26.2 (79.2)	26.3 (79.3)	26.7 (80.0)
Mean daily minimum °C (°F)	22.5 (72.5)	23.0 (73.4)	23.3 (73.9)	23.4 (74.1)	23.4 (74.1)	23.1 (73.6)	23.2 (73.8)	23.1 (73.6)	23.1 (73.6)	22.9 (73.2)	22.8 (73.0)	22.9 (73.2)	23.1 (73.5)
Average rainfall mm (inches)	224 (8.8)	171 (6.7)	215 (8.5)	413 (16.3)	423 (16.7)	446 (17.6)	477 (18.8)	539 (21.2)	471 (18.5)	481 (18.9)	462 (18.2)	430 (16.9)	4,752 (187.1)
