= Domingodó, Chocó =

Domingodó
- Location in Chocó and Colombia Domingodó (Colombia)
- Coordinates: 7°10′42.6″N 77°2′4.1″W
- Country: Colombia
- Department: Chocó
- Municipality: El Carmen del Darién Municipality
- Elevation: 36 ft (11 m)

Population (2005)
  - Total: 811
- Time zone: UTC-5 (Colombia Standard Time)

Domingodó is a settlement in El Carmen del Darién Municipality, Chocó Department, Colombia.

== Climate ==
Domingodó has a wet tropical rainforest climate (Af) with heavy rainfall from November to April and very heavy rainfall from May to October.

Climate data for Domingodó
Month	Jan	Feb	Mar	Apr	May	Jun	Jul	Aug	Sep	Oct	Nov	Dec	Year
Mean daily maximum °C (°F)	30.0 (86.0)	30.4 (86.7)	30.8 (87.4)	31.0 (87.8)	29.2 (84.6)	29.4 (84.9)	29.7 (85.5)	29.4 (84.9)	28.9 (84.0)	28.7 (83.7)	29.1 (84.4)	29.1 (84.4)	29.6 (85.4)
Daily mean °C (°F)	26.1 (79.0)	26.6 (79.9)	26.9 (80.4)	27.1 (80.8)	26.1 (79.0)	26.2 (79.2)	26.4 (79.5)	26.1 (79.0)	25.9 (78.6)	25.7 (78.3)	25.9 (78.6)	25.8 (78.4)	26.2 (79.2)
Mean daily minimum °C (°F)	22.2 (72.0)	22.8 (73.0)	23.1 (73.6)	23.2 (73.8)	23.1 (73.6)	23.0 (73.4)	23.1 (73.6)	22.9 (73.2)	22.9 (73.2)	22.8 (73.0)	22.7 (72.9)	22.6 (72.7)	22.9 (73.2)
Average rainfall mm (inches)	169.4 (6.67)	122.4 (4.82)	150.5 (5.93)	272.1 (10.71)	380.1 (14.96)	365.9 (14.41)	442.3 (17.41)	399.3 (15.72)	313.6 (12.35)	306.2 (12.06)	299.8 (11.80)	274.4 (10.80)	3,496 (137.64)
Average rainy days	8	5	6	12	17	18	19	19	17	16	15	13	165
