= Jhoiner Asprilla =

Colombian footballer (born 2004)

Personal information
- Full name: Jhoiner Asprilla Renteria
- Date of birth: 15 December 2004 (age 21)
- Place of birth: Necoclí, Antioquia, Colombia
- Position: Central defender

Team information
- Current team: San Francisco
- Number: 28

Youth career
- Alianza Platanera
- 2020–2023: América de Cali

Senior career*
Years	Team	Apps	(Gls)
2023–	América de Cali	3	(0)
2024–	→ San Francisco (loan)	0	(0)
- * Club domestic league appearances and goals as of 28 August 2024

Jhoiner Asprilla Renteria (born 15 December 2004) is a Colombian footballer who plays as a central defender for Panamanian club San Francisco on loan from América de Cali.

== Club career ==
Born in Necoclí in the Antioquia Department of Colombia, Asprilla trialled with Cortuluá and Deportivo Cali, but both clubs rejected him due to a knee problem, with the latter club not even allowing him to train. He went on to captain local side Alianza Platanera at youth level, before joining América de Cali. With John García injured and Kevin Andrade suspended, Asprilla was given his first team debut on 2 April 2023, starting in a 0–0 draw with Jaguares de Córdoba.

== Career statistics ==
=== Club ===
As of 14 July 2023.

Appearances and goals by club, season and competition
Club	Season	League			Cup		Continental		Other		Total	
Club	Season	Division	Apps	Goals	Apps	Goals	Apps	Goals	Apps	Goals	Apps	Goals
América de Cali	2023	Categoría Primera A	3	0	0	0	–		0	0	3	0
Career total			3	0	0	0	0	0	0	0	3	0
