= Urabá Antioquia =

Subregion of the Antioquia department, Colombia

Coordinates: 7°53′N 76°38′W

Location of the Urabá Antioquia region within the Antioquia Department.

Urabá Antioquia is a region of Colombia's Antioquia Department that consists of two non-contiguous sections, one forming the northwest of the department, the other the west. Both are along the Atrato River. They are separated by the El Carmen del Darién and Riosucio municipalities of Chocó Department, with territories in both municipalities in dispute with Chocó. The region is made up by 11 municipalities. Most of this region's northern portion is part of the Colombian Caribbean Region bordering the Caribbean Sea.

== Municipalities ==
- Apartadó
- Arboletes
- Carepa
- Chigorodó
- Murindó
- Mutatá
- Turbo
- Necoclí
- San Juan de Urabá
- San Pedro de Urabá
- Vigía del Fuerte

== Notable people ==
- Luis Eduardo Gómez (ca. 1941 – 1971), freelance journalist
