= Necoclí Airport =

Necoclí Airport Antioquia Airport
- IATA: NCI; ICAO: SKNC

Summary
- Airport type: Public
- Serves: Necoclí, Colombia
- Elevation AMSL: 19 ft / 6 m
- Coordinates: 8°27′05″N 76°46′40″W

Map

Runways
Direction	Length		Surface
Direction	m	ft	Surface
16/34	1,000	3,281	Asphalt
- Source: GCM Google Maps

Necoclí Airport (IATA: NCI, ICAO: SKNC) is a general aviation airport serving the town of Necoclí in the Antioquia Department of Colombia. There are no scheduled flights.

The airport is 3 kilometres (1.9 mi) north of the town and 2 kilometres (1.2 mi) inland from the Gulf of Urabá shore.

== See also ==
- Transport in Colombia
- List of airports in Colombia
