= Luis Eduardo Gómez =

- Born: Luis Eduardo Gómez ca. 1941
- Died: 2011-06-30; Arboletes, Colombia
- Occupation: Freelance journalist

Luis Eduardo Gómez (ca. 1941 – 30 June 2011), a Colombian, was working as a freelance journalist for local newspapers in the Urabá region of Antioquia, Colombia. Gómez was shot by gunmen on his way home and his death grabbed the attention of people worldwide. His death brought to light corruption taking place between local politicians and paramilitary groups.

== Death ==
While walking home with his wife, Gómez was attacked by gunmen. The attackers had been waiting for the journalist when he arrived. Afterward, the gunman immediately fled the crime scene. Police are still unsure who killed Gomez, however, it is believed that his death was directly connected to his participation as a witness in an investigation dealing with paramilitary issues. At the funeral of another journalist, José Vicente Botero, on June 27, 2011, Gómez stressed that Botero's death was connected to an alliance between corrupt government and paramilitary groups. His statement is believed to have led to his murder three days later. Gómez was looking into the paramilitary groups at the time of his death. As the fourth witness to be murdered since October 2010, it brought attention to a possible link between the case and the journalists' deaths.

== Context ==
For over 40 years, Colombia, a country well known for manufacturing and shipping illegal substances, has had issues with civil conflicts and rebel groups forming from within. Over the last decade progress has been made to make the country more secure, but paramilitary groups have recently returned. The country has become especially hazardous to human rights campaigners, labor leaders, journalists, and politicians. Many have been shot as an intimidation tactic. The demobilization of many of the paramilitary gangs that occurred in 2006 actually created another issue as these gangs evolved into bacrims, or criminal gangs. These gangs have been stealing land from peasants through force, drug trafficking, and kidnapping among other offenses. The continual cycle of violence and hostility from within Colombia has caused many citizens to fear for their own safety as a result of the lack of adequate police and judicial forces. Gómez was a witness in a paramilitary case that would link politicians and illegal extremist paramilitary groups together. The case that he witnessed was commonly known as the "parapolitics" scandal.

== Reactions ==
Irina Bokova, who is the director-general of UNESCO, said: "I condemn the murder of Luis Eduardo Gómez. I am very concerned about the use of violence to silence journalists as there can be no good governance and rule of law without a free and independent press. I call on the Colombian authorities do all they can to find the perpetrators of this crime and bring them to justice."

The Inter-American Press Association also expressed their concern about the shooting of Gómez and urged authorities to immediately begin investigating and bring to justice those responsible.

== Career ==
Gómez was a local Colombian journalist known for his freelancing with newspapers such as El Heraldo de Urabá and Urabá al día. In both publications his most recent work focused on the environment and tourism. He was also known for his reporting the use of public resources, local government, and the role they played in the investigation of his son's death.

== Personal ==
Gómez had a wife and son. At the time of his death, he was investigating his son's unsolved death. He and his son worked together as a team.
