= Luis Enrique Mena =

Colombian footballer (born 1992)

Personal information
- Full name: Luis Enrique Mena Valoyes
- Date of birth: July 16, 1992 (age 34)
- Place of birth: Riosucio, Chocó, Colombia
- Height: 1.77 m (5 ft 10 in)
- Position: Midfielder

Team information
- Current team: Millonarios

Youth career
- 2007: Millonarios

Senior career*
Years	Team	Apps	(Gls)
2008–present	Millonarios	2	(0)
- * Club domestic league appearances and goals as of November 14, 2010

Luis Enrique Mena (born in Riosucio, Chocó on July 16, 1992) is a Colombian football midfield, who currently plays for Millonarios in the Categoría Primera A. Mena is a product of the Millonarios youth system and played with the Millonarios first team since April, 2008.

== Statistics (Official games/Colombian Ligue and Colombian Cup) ==
(As of November 14, 2010)

Year	Team	Colombian Ligue Matches	Goals	Colombian Cup Matches	Goals	Total Matches	Total Goals
2008	Millonarios	0	0	2	0	2	0
2009	Millonarios	1	0	3	0	4	0
2010	Millonarios	1	0	2	0	3	0
Total	Millonarios	2	0	7	0	9	0
