= Necoclí =

- Municipality and town
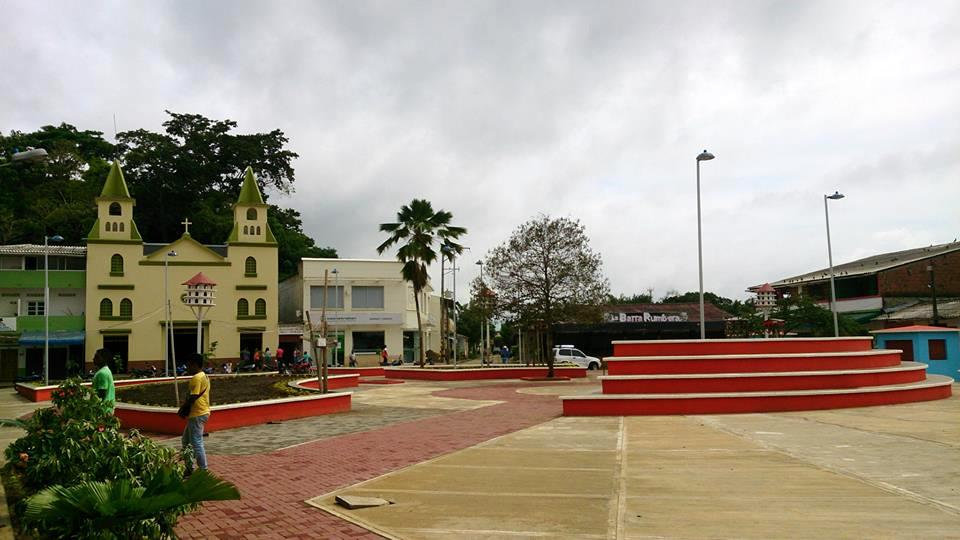

- Flag

- Location of the municipality and town of Necoclí in the Antioquia Department of Colombia

- Location in Colombia
- Coordinates: 8°25′0″N 76°47′0″W
- Country: Colombia
- Department: Antioquia Department
- Subregion: Urabá

Population (2020 est.)
  - Total: 70,824
- Time zone: UTC-5 (Colombia Standard Time)

Necoclí is a town and municipality in Antioquia Department, Colombia. Located on the eastern shore of the Gulf of Urabá, it is part of the Urabá Antioquia sub-region. The population is predominantly Afro-Colombian.

It was founded as a Spanish city called San Sebastián de Buena Vista. One of Colombia's oldest towns, it was founded in 1509 by Pedro de Heredia, who died in 1555.

Some early reports of the town can be found in chapter 9 of Pedro Cieza de León's Crónica del Perú (1553).

Necoclí Airport is a general aviation airport, without scheduled flights. Buses link the town with Cartagena, the department capital of Medellín, and other points. There are scheduled launches to two towns without road access, Capurganá and Acandí, across the gulf and near the Panamanian border.

== 2021 deluge of Haitian migrants ==
The town is as close to Panama as one can get by road from the south, and serves as an impromptu staging ground for migrants attempting to cross the Gulf of Urabá to Capurganá, and from there by hiking through the Darién Gap into Panama, en route to the United States. While the population of Necoclí is about 20,000, about 25,000 migrants, 75% of which were Haitian, passed through Necoclí between January and August, 2021. The number of migrants arriving exceeded the capacity of the ferries across the Gulf of Urabá, causing extended waits for a free seat. In August 2021 there were some 10,000 migrants sleeping in hostels, churches, or on the beach. The town's water system collapsed, unable to handle the increased load. The mayor proclaimed a state of emergency ("calamidad pública").

== Demographics ==
Total population: 42,281 hab. (2018)

- Urban Population: 21,995
- Rural Population: 20,326

Literacy: 76.8% (2005)

- Urban area: 88.6%
- Rural area: 73.1%

=== Ethnography ===
According to the figures presented by DANE in the 2005 census, the ethnographic composition of the municipality is:

- Afro-descendants (59.0%).
  Historical population
  Year	Pop.	±%
  1964	9,456	—
  1973	13,716	+45.1%
  1985	27,689	+101.9%
  1993	34,198	+23.5%
  2005	47,989	+40.3%
  2018	42,281	−11.9%
- Mestizos and whites (37.5%).
- Indigenous (3.5%).

== Climate ==
Necoclí has a tropical monsoon climate (Köppen Am) with moderate rainfall from January to March and heavy rainfall in the remaining months.

Climate data for Necoclí (Mellito El), elevation 10 m (33 ft), (1981–2010)
Month	Jan	Feb	Mar	Apr	May	Jun	Jul	Aug	Sep	Oct	Nov	Dec	Year
Mean daily maximum °C (°F)	30.8 (87.4)	31.1 (88.0)	31.0 (87.8)	31.3 (88.3)	31.2 (88.2)	31.3 (88.3)	31.2 (88.2)	31.2 (88.2)	31.1 (88.0)	31.3 (88.3)	30.9 (87.6)	30.9 (87.6)	31.1 (88.0)
Daily mean °C (°F)	26.6 (79.9)	26.8 (80.2)	27.1 (80.8)	27.4 (81.3)	27.2 (81.0)	27.0 (80.6)	27.0 (80.6)	27.0 (80.6)	26.9 (80.4)	26.9 (80.4)	26.8 (80.2)	26.6 (79.9)	26.9 (80.4)
Mean daily minimum °C (°F)	22.6 (72.7)	23.6 (74.5)	24.1 (75.4)	24.5 (76.1)	24.1 (75.4)	23.6 (74.5)	23.3 (73.9)	23.3 (73.9)	23.3 (73.9)	23.4 (74.1)	23.4 (74.1)	23.3 (73.9)	23.5 (74.3)
Average rainfall mm (inches)	51.0 (2.01)	65.3 (2.57)	82.2 (3.24)	208.1 (8.19)	205.6 (8.09)	180.0 (7.09)	185.6 (7.31)	205.5 (8.09)	186.9 (7.36)	181.0 (7.13)	208.0 (8.19)	132.7 (5.22)	1,886.4 (74.27)
Average rainy days (≥ 1.0 mm)	6	5	8	12	15	14	14	16	14	15	14	10	138
Average relative humidity (%)	86	84	84	85	87	87	87	87	87	87	87	87	86
Mean monthly sunshine hours	186.0	158.1	148.8	123.0	117.8	111.0	136.4	136.4	129.0	142.6	153.0	164.3	1,706.4
Mean daily sunshine hours	6.0	5.6	4.8	4.1	3.8	3.7	4.4	4.4	4.3	4.6	5.1	5.3	4.7
Source: Instituto de Hidrologia Meteorologia y Estudios Ambientales

== See also ==
- Acandí
- Capurganá
