= Murrí River =

The Murrí River is a river of Colombia. It drains into the Caribbean Sea via the Atrato River.

== Geography ==
The Río Murrí rises on the western slopes of the Cordillera Occidental, in Las Orquídeas National Natural Park (Antioquia department). It then flows westwards before joining the Atrato river in the municipality of Bojayá (Chocó department).

== See also ==
- List of rivers of Colombia
