= San Juan de Urabá =

- Municipality and town
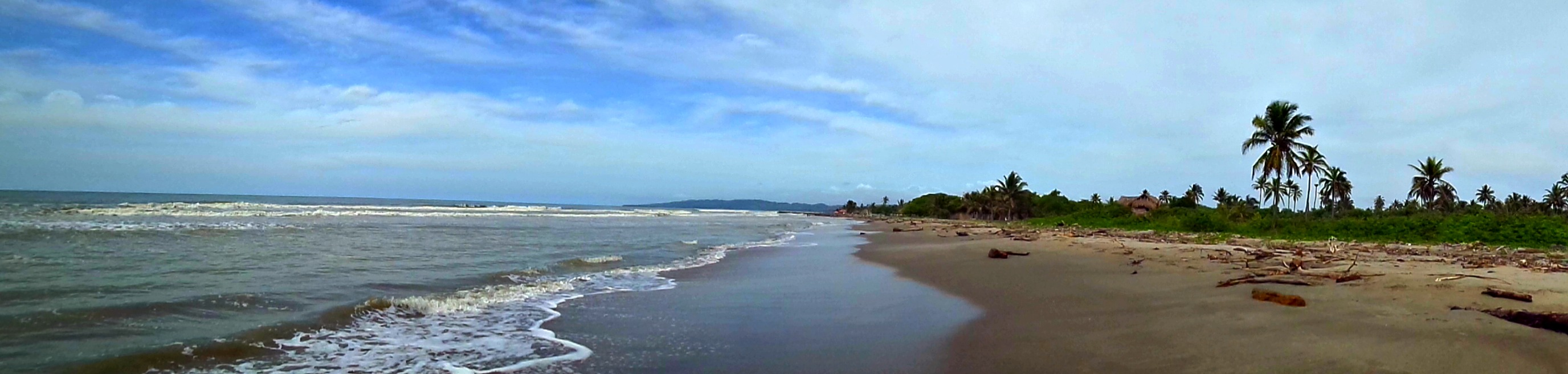

- Flag Coat of arms

- Location of the municipality and town of San Juan de Urabá in the Antioquia Department of Colombia

- Location in Colombia
- Coordinates: 8°46′0″N 76°32′0″W
- Country: Colombia
- Department: Antioquia Department
- Subregion: Urabá

Population (Census 2018)
  - Total: 19,992
- Time zone: UTC-5 (Colombia Standard Time)

San Juan de Urabá is a town and municipality in the Colombian department of Antioquia. It is part of the Urabá Antioquia sub-region.

== Climate ==
San Juan de Urabá has a tropical monsoon climate (Köppen Am) with moderate to little rainfall from December to March and heavy rainfall from April to November.

Climate data for San Juan de Urabá
Month	Jan	Feb	Mar	Apr	May	Jun	Jul	Aug	Sep	Oct	Nov	Dec	Year
Mean daily maximum °C (°F)	30.0 (86.0)	30.0 (86.0)	30.1 (86.2)	31.3 (88.3)	30.1 (86.2)	30.3 (86.5)	30.1 (86.2)	30.0 (86.0)	30.0 (86.0)	30.1 (86.2)	30.1 (86.2)	30.4 (86.7)	30.2 (86.4)
Daily mean °C (°F)	26.6 (79.9)	26.8 (80.2)	27.1 (80.8)	26.9 (80.4)	26.6 (79.9)	26.7 (80.1)	26.5 (79.7)	26.4 (79.5)	26.4 (79.5)	26.5 (79.7)	26.6 (79.9)	26.7 (80.1)	26.7 (80.0)
Mean daily minimum °C (°F)	23.2 (73.8)	23.7 (74.7)	24.2 (75.6)	23.6 (74.5)	23.2 (73.8)	23.1 (73.6)	23.0 (73.4)	22.9 (73.2)	22.8 (73.0)	22.9 (73.2)	23.1 (73.6)	23.0 (73.4)	23.2 (73.8)
Average rainfall mm (inches)	32.3 (1.27)	34.2 (1.35)	63.2 (2.49)	161.4 (6.35)	267.8 (10.54)	242.3 (9.54)	212.1 (8.35)	281.7 (11.09)	239.1 (9.41)	239.5 (9.43)	261.8 (10.31)	128.8 (5.07)	2,164.2 (85.2)
Average rainy days	3	2	3	6	10	9	9	10	9	10	9	5	85
Source 1: IDEAM
Source 2: Climate-Data.org
