= Opogodo, Chocó =

Opogodo
- Populated center
- Location in Chocó and Colombia Opogodo (Colombia)
- Coordinates: 5°2′59.6616″N 76°39′0.6012″W
- Country: Colombia
- Department: Chocó
- Municipality: Condoto Municipality
- Elevation: 230 ft (70 m)
- Time zone: UTC-5 (Colombia Standard Time)

Opogodo is a populated center of Colombia in Condoto Municipality, Chocó Department in Colombia.

== Climate ==
Opogodo has an extremely wet tropical rainforest climate (Af).

Climate data for Opogodo
Month	Jan	Feb	Mar	Apr	May	Jun	Jul	Aug	Sep	Oct	Nov	Dec	Year
Mean daily maximum °C (°F)	29.9 (85.8)	29.8 (85.6)	30.5 (86.9)	30.3 (86.5)	30.4 (86.7)	30.2 (86.4)	30.5 (86.9)	30.5 (86.9)	30.2 (86.4)	29.7 (85.5)	29.3 (84.7)	29.6 (85.3)	30.1 (86.1)
Daily mean °C (°F)	26.7 (80.1)	26.5 (79.7)	27.0 (80.6)	27.0 (80.6)	27.0 (80.6)	26.8 (80.2)	26.9 (80.4)	26.9 (80.4)	26.7 (80.1)	26.4 (79.5)	26.2 (79.2)	26.5 (79.7)	26.7 (80.1)
Mean daily minimum °C (°F)	23.5 (74.3)	23.3 (73.9)	23.6 (74.5)	23.7 (74.7)	23.6 (74.5)	23.4 (74.1)	23.4 (74.1)	23.3 (73.9)	23.3 (73.9)	23.2 (73.8)	23.2 (73.8)	23.4 (74.1)	23.4 (74.1)
Average rainfall mm (inches)	654.9 (25.78)	621.8 (24.48)	611.3 (24.07)	764.6 (30.10)	809.2 (31.86)	622.9 (24.52)	677.2 (26.66)	759.5 (29.90)	683.7 (26.92)	724.4 (28.52)	654.6 (25.77)	624.5 (24.59)	8,208.6 (323.17)
Average rainy days	16	14	16	17	17	16	18	18	17	17	17	16	199
