= Mutatá =

- Municipality and town
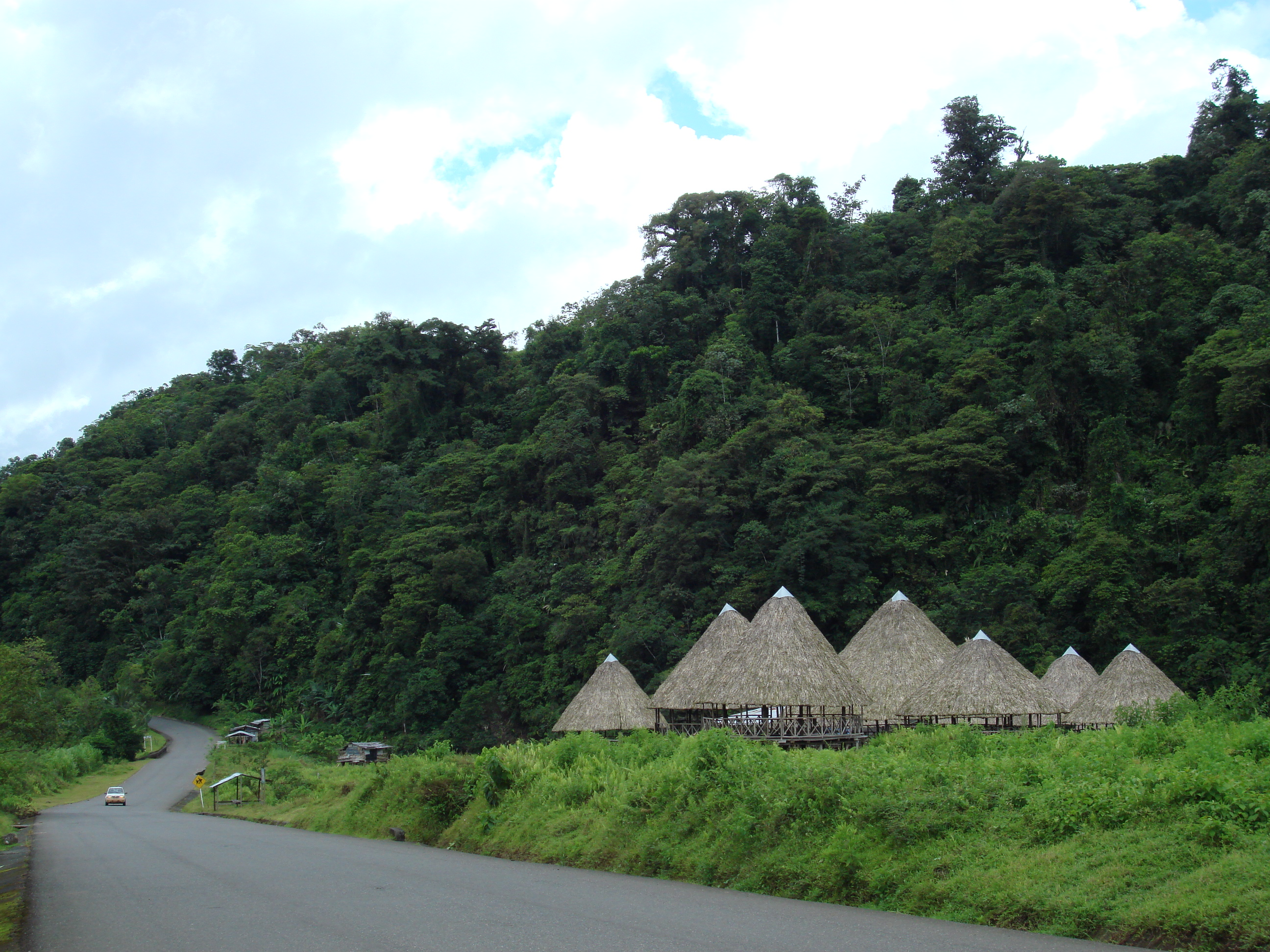

- Flag

- Location of the municipality and town of Mutatá in the Antioquia Department of Colombia

- Location in Colombia
- Coordinates: 7°14′39″N 76°26′9″W
- Country: Colombia
- Department: Antioquia Department
- Subregion: Urabá

Population (Census 2018)
  - Total: 12,607
- Time zone: UTC-5 (Colombia Standard Time)

Mutatá is a municipality in the Colombian department of Antioquia. It is part of the Urabá Antioquia sub-region.

== Climate ==
Mutatá has a tropical rainforest climate (Köppen Af) with very heavy rainfall year round.

Climate data for Mutatá (Villartaega) 1981-2010 normals
Month	Jan	Feb	Mar	Apr	May	Jun	Jul	Aug	Sep	Oct	Nov	Dec	Year
Mean daily maximum °C (°F)	29.9 (85.8)	30.4 (86.7)	30.2 (86.4)	30.7 (87.3)	30.6 (87.1)	30.5 (86.9)	30.1 (86.2)	30.4 (86.7)	30.1 (86.2)	29.9 (85.8)	30.0 (86.0)	30.4 (86.7)	30.3 (86.5)
Daily mean °C (°F)	26.0 (78.8)	26.2 (79.2)	26.2 (79.2)	26.3 (79.3)	26.4 (79.5)	26.2 (79.2)	25.9 (78.6)	25.9 (78.6)	25.9 (78.6)	25.9 (78.6)	25.7 (78.3)	25.8 (78.4)	26.1 (79.0)
Mean daily minimum °C (°F)	22.1 (71.8)	22.0 (71.6)	22.2 (72.0)	21.9 (71.4)	21.7 (71.1)	21.9 (71.4)	21.7 (71.1)	21.4 (70.5)	21.7 (71.1)	21.3 (70.3)	21.4 (70.5)	21.2 (70.2)	21.7 (71.1)
Average precipitation mm (inches)	185.5 (7.30)	138.2 (5.44)	157.3 (6.19)	365.9 (14.41)	629.9 (24.80)	575.3 (22.65)	496.0 (19.53)	549.6 (21.64)	590.4 (23.24)	680.7 (26.80)	642.8 (25.31)	372.8 (14.68)	5,384.4 (211.98)
Average rainy days	11	10	12	19	25	24	24	26	25	25	24	18	237
Average relative humidity (%)	87	87	86	88	88	88	88	88	88	88	89	88	88
Mean monthly sunshine hours	120.9	104.5	96.1	81.0	83.7	75.0	83.7	80.6	78.0	93.0	87.0	96.1	1,079.6
Mean daily sunshine hours	3.9	3.7	3.1	2.7	2.7	2.5	2.7	2.6	2.6	3.0	2.9	3.1	3.0
Source: Instituto de Hidrología, Meteorología y Estudios Ambientales
