= Gulf of Urabá =

Northern coast of Colombia

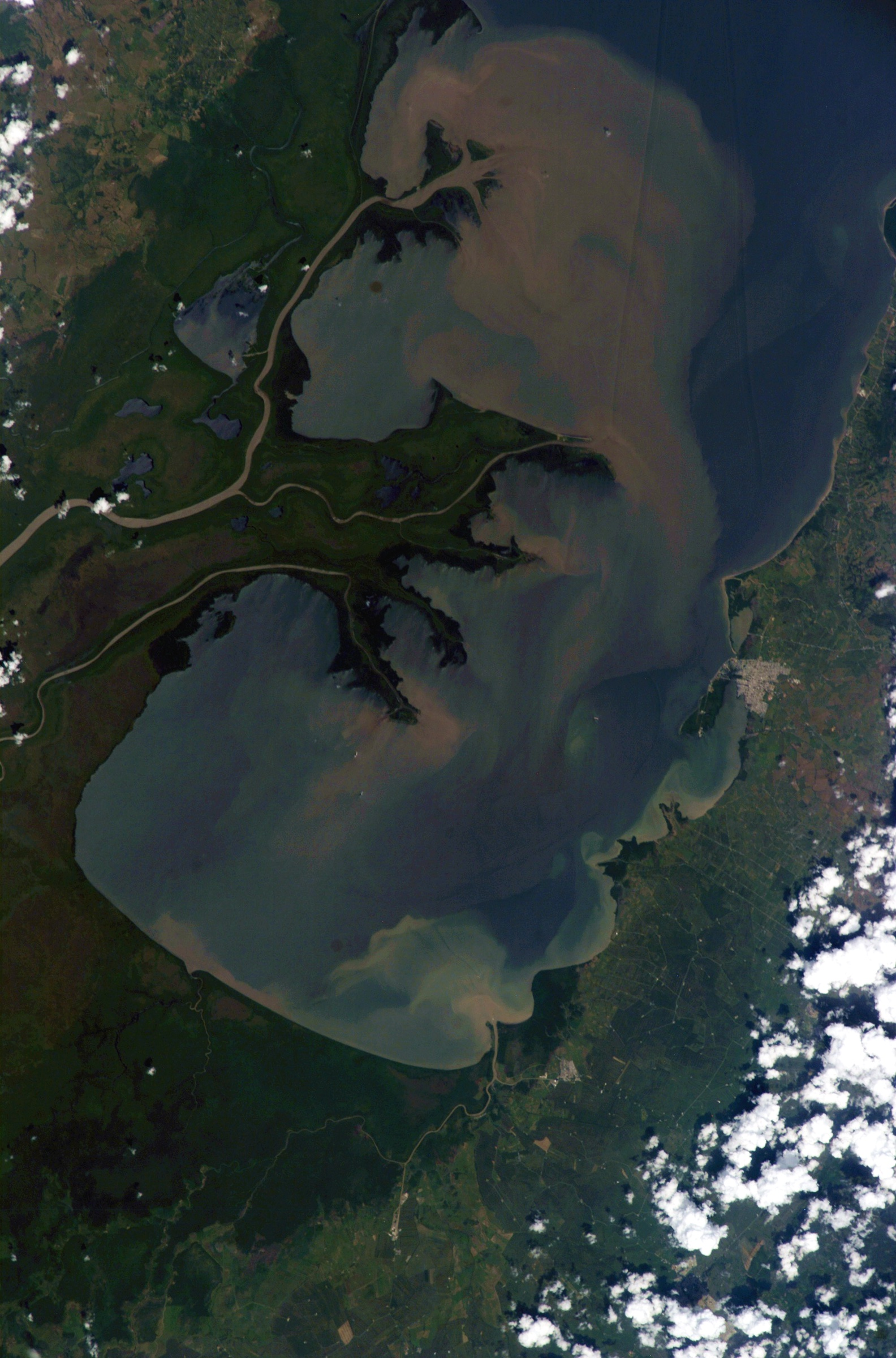
- Gulf of Urabá with the deltas of the Atrato River (north is toward the top right)

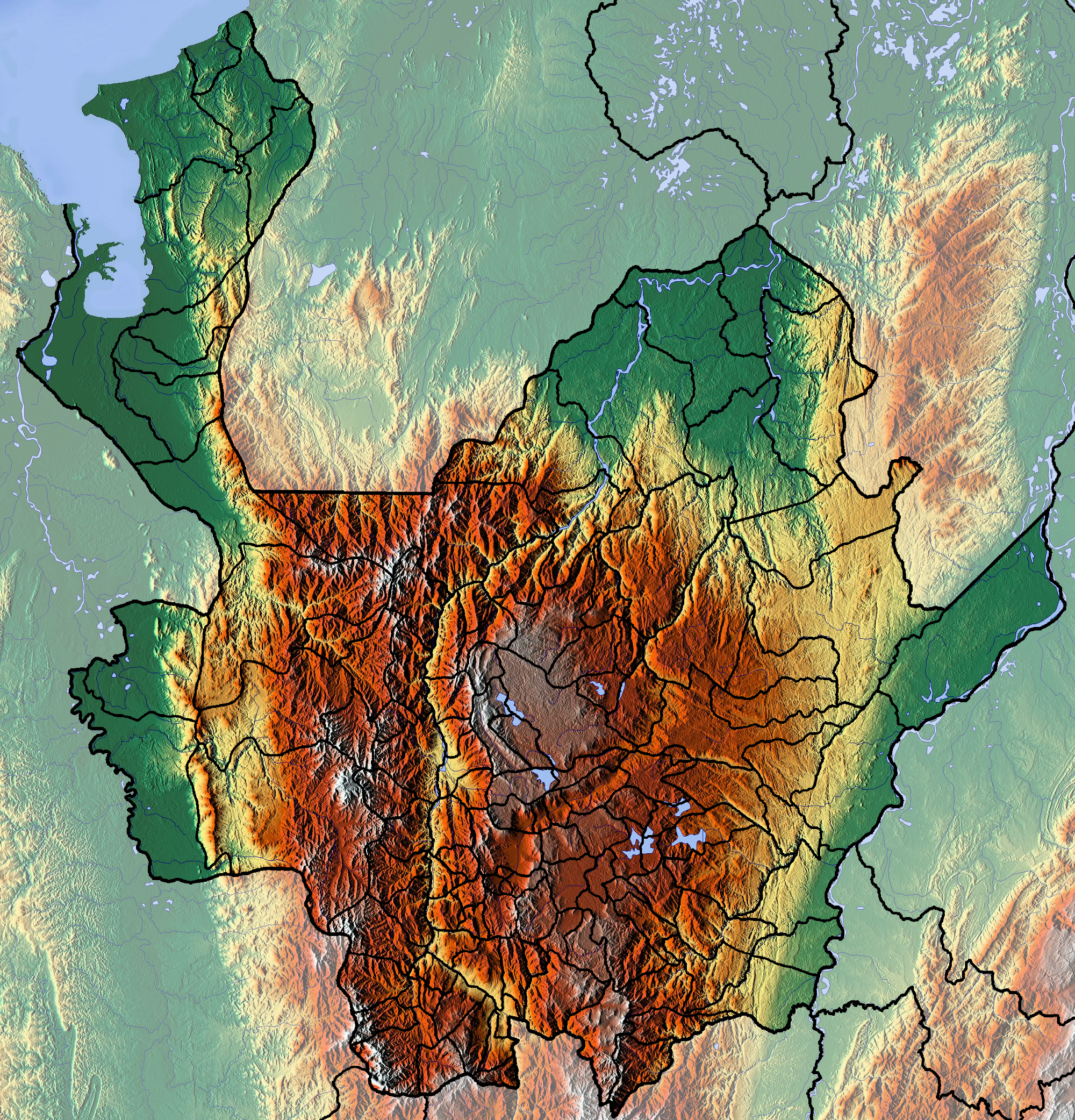
- Location within Antioquia Department Gulf of Urabá (Antioquia Department)
- Interactive map of Gulf of Urabá
- Location: Antioquia and Chocó, Colombia
- Coordinates: 8°21′N 76°59′W
- Type: Gulf, Estuary
- River sources: Atrato River, Leon River
- Primary outflows: Gulf of Darién
- Ocean/sea sources: Caribbean Sea
- Max. length: 80 km (50 mi)
- Max. width: 49 km (30 mi)
- Surface area: 1,800 km^{2} (690 sq mi)
- Average depth: 40 m (130 ft)
- Max. depth: 70 m (230 ft)
- Settlements: Turbo, Necoclí, Acandí

The Gulf of Urabá is a gulf on the northern coast of Colombia. It is part of the Caribbean Sea. It is a long, wide inlet located on the coast of Colombia, close to the connection of the continent to the Isthmus of Panama. The town of Turbo, Colombia, lies at the mid eastern side naturally sheltered by the Turbo Bay part of the Gulf. The Atrato River flows into the Gulf of Urabá.

A study by Bio-Pacific has suggested, as an alternative to building a 54‑mile (87 km) link across the Darién Gap to complete the Pan-American Highway, that the Panama section of the highway be extended to the Caribbean coast and end at the Gulf of Urabá, then be connected by ferry to existing highways in Colombia.

== Urabá Antioquia subregion ==
The area surrounding the gulf comprises a geopolitical subregion of Colombia known as Urabá Antioquia.
