= Dabeiba =

- Municipality and town
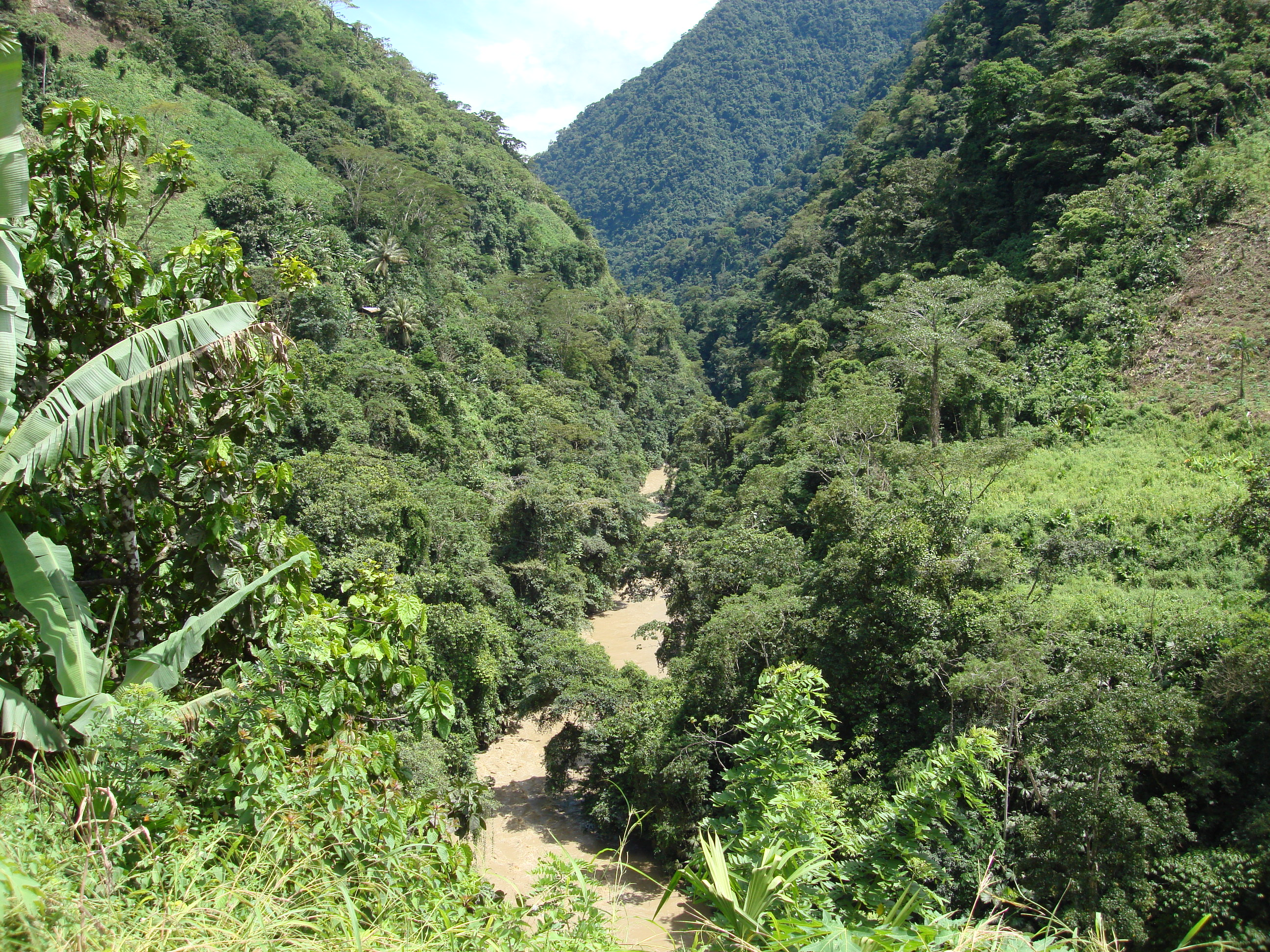
- Bold t§ext

- Flag Coat of arms

- Location of the municipality and town of Dabeiba in the Antioquia Department of Colombia

- Location in Colombia
- Coordinates: 7°0′5″N 76°15′40″W
- Country: Colombia
- Department: Antioquia Department
- Subregion: Western

Area
  - Total: 1,883 km^{2} (727 sq mi)
- Elevation: 450 m (1,480 ft)

Population (Census 2018)
  - Total: 22,717
  - Density: 12.06/km^{2} (31.25/sq mi)
- Time zone: UTC-5 (Colombia Standard Time)

Dabeiba (Spanish pronunciation: [daˈβejβa]) is a town and municipality in the Colombian department of Antioquia. The population was 22,717 at the 2018 census. The Battle of Dabeiba took place there in October 2000.

== Climate ==
Dabeiba has a tropical rainforest climate (Köppen Af) with very heavy rainfall most of the year and a drier season from January to March, when there is still between 90 and 110 millimetres (3.5 and 4.3 in) of rain. The climate is markedly less extreme than the core of the Chocó to its south, receiving less than half the rainfall of such towns as Andagoya, Quibdó or Buenaventura.

Climate data for Dabeiba
Month	Jan	Feb	Mar	Apr	May	Jun	Jul	Aug	Sep	Oct	Nov	Dec	Year
Mean daily maximum °C (°F)	31.5 (88.7)	31.6 (88.9)	32.1 (89.8)	31.5 (88.7)	30.4 (86.7)	30.6 (87.1)	30.7 (87.3)	30.7 (87.3)	29.9 (85.8)	29.8 (85.6)	29.8 (85.6)	30.3 (86.5)	30.7 (87.3)
Daily mean °C (°F)	25.7 (78.3)	26.1 (79.0)	26.6 (79.9)	26.1 (79.0)	25.6 (78.1)	25.6 (78.1)	25.6 (78.1)	25.7 (78.3)	25.2 (77.4)	25.1 (77.2)	25.1 (77.2)	25.3 (77.5)	25.6 (78.2)
Mean daily minimum °C (°F)	20.0 (68.0)	20.6 (69.1)	21.1 (70.0)	20.8 (69.4)	20.8 (69.4)	20.6 (69.1)	20.6 (69.1)	20.7 (69.3)	20.6 (69.1)	20.5 (68.9)	20.5 (68.9)	20.4 (68.7)	20.6 (69.1)
Average rainfall mm (inches)	95 (3.7)	91 (3.6)	108 (4.3)	274 (10.8)	342 (13.5)	331 (13.0)	319 (12.6)	359 (14.1)	349 (13.7)	385 (15.2)	299 (11.8)	209 (8.2)	3,161 (124.5)
Source: Climate-Data.org
