= El Carmen del Darién =

- Municipality and town
- Flag

- Location of the municipality and town of Carmen del Darién in the Chocó Department of Colombia.
- Coordinates: 7°9′28″N 76°58′15″W
- Country: Colombia
- Department: Chocó Department

Area
  - Municipality and town: 4,700 km^{2} (1,800 sq mi)

Population (2015)
  - Municipality and town: 5,462
  - Urban: 1,321
- Time zone: UTC-5 (Colombia Standard Time)

El Carmen del Darién is a municipality and town in the northern part of the Chocó Department, Colombia.

== Climate ==
El Carmen del Darién has a tropical rainforest climate (Köppen Af) with heavy to very heavy rainfall year round. The following climate data is for Curbaradó, the capital of the municipality.

Climate data for Curbaradó
Month	Jan	Feb	Mar	Apr	May	Jun	Jul	Aug	Sep	Oct	Nov	Dec	Year
Mean daily maximum °C (°F)	30.1 (86.2)	30.4 (86.7)	30.9 (87.6)	31.0 (87.8)	29.4 (84.9)	29.5 (85.1)	29.8 (85.6)	29.6 (85.3)	29.0 (84.2)	28.9 (84.0)	29.1 (84.4)	29.3 (84.7)	29.8 (85.5)
Daily mean °C (°F)	26.1 (79.0)	26.5 (79.7)	27.0 (80.6)	27.0 (80.6)	26.3 (79.3)	26.2 (79.2)	26.4 (79.5)	26.3 (79.3)	25.9 (78.6)	25.8 (78.4)	25.9 (78.6)	26.0 (78.8)	26.3 (79.3)
Mean daily minimum °C (°F)	22.2 (72.0)	22.7 (72.9)	23.1 (73.6)	23.1 (73.6)	23.0 (73.4)	23.0 (73.4)	23.0 (73.4)	23.0 (73.4)	22.9 (73.2)	22.8 (73.0)	22.7 (72.9)	22.7 (72.9)	22.8 (73.1)
Average rainfall mm (inches)	101 (4.0)	99 (3.9)	114 (4.5)	284 (11.2)	359 (14.1)	386 (15.2)	413 (16.3)	448 (17.6)	368 (14.5)	431 (17.0)	403 (15.9)	313 (12.3)	3,719 (146.5)
