= Unguía =

Coordinates: 8°03′N 77°06′W

- Municipality and town
- Flag

- Location of the municipality and town of Unguía in the Chocó Department of Colombia.
- Country: Colombia
- Department: Chocó Department

Area
  - Total: 1,307 km^{2} (505 sq mi)

Population (Census 2018)
  - Total: 12,192
  - Density: 9.328/km^{2} (24.16/sq mi)
- Time zone: UTC-5 (Colombia Standard Time)

Unguía is a municipality and town in the far north of the Chocó Department, Colombia.

== Climate ==
Unguía has a tropical monsoon climate (Köppen Am) with heavy rainfall from April to December and little to moderate rainfall from January to March. It is the driest place in the extremely wet department of Chocó with only 2,392 millimetres or 94.2 inches of rain.

Climate data for Unguía town
| Month | Jan | Feb | Mar | Apr | May | Jun | Jul | Aug | Sep | Oct | Nov | Dec | Year |
|---|---|---|---|---|---|---|---|---|---|---|---|---|---|
| Mean daily maximum °C (°F) | 30.4 (86.7) | 30.7 (87.3) | 31.1 (88.0) | 31.4 (88.5) | 29.9 (85.8) | 30.2 (86.4) | 30.5 (86.9) | 30.3 (86.5) | 30.1 (86.2) | 29.8 (85.6) | 29.8 (85.6) | 30.0 (86.0) | 30.4 (86.6) |
| Daily mean °C (°F) | 26.2 (79.2) | 26.6 (79.9) | 26.9 (80.4) | 27.1 (80.8) | 26.2 (79.2) | 26.3 (79.3) | 26.6 (79.9) | 26.3 (79.3) | 26.3 (79.3) | 26.1 (79.0) | 26.1 (79.0) | 26.1 (79.0) | 26.4 (79.5) |
| Mean daily minimum °C (°F) | 22.1 (71.8) | 22.5 (72.5) | 22.8 (73.0) | 22.8 (73.0) | 22.6 (72.7) | 22.5 (72.5) | 22.7 (72.9) | 22.4 (72.3) | 22.5 (72.5) | 22.5 (72.5) | 22.5 (72.5) | 22.2 (72.0) | 22.5 (72.5) |
| Average rainfall mm (inches) | 50 (2.0) | 69 (2.7) | 85 (3.3) | 195 (7.7) | 301 (11.9) | 273 (10.7) | 267 (10.5) | 255 (10.0) | 213 (8.4) | 264 (10.4) | 235 (9.3) | 185 (7.3) | 2,392 (94.2) |
| Average rainy days | 3 | 3 | 4 | 7 | 12 | 12 | 13 | 13 | 10 | 11 | 11 | 8 | 107 |
Source 1:
Source 2:
