= Turbo, Colombia =

- City
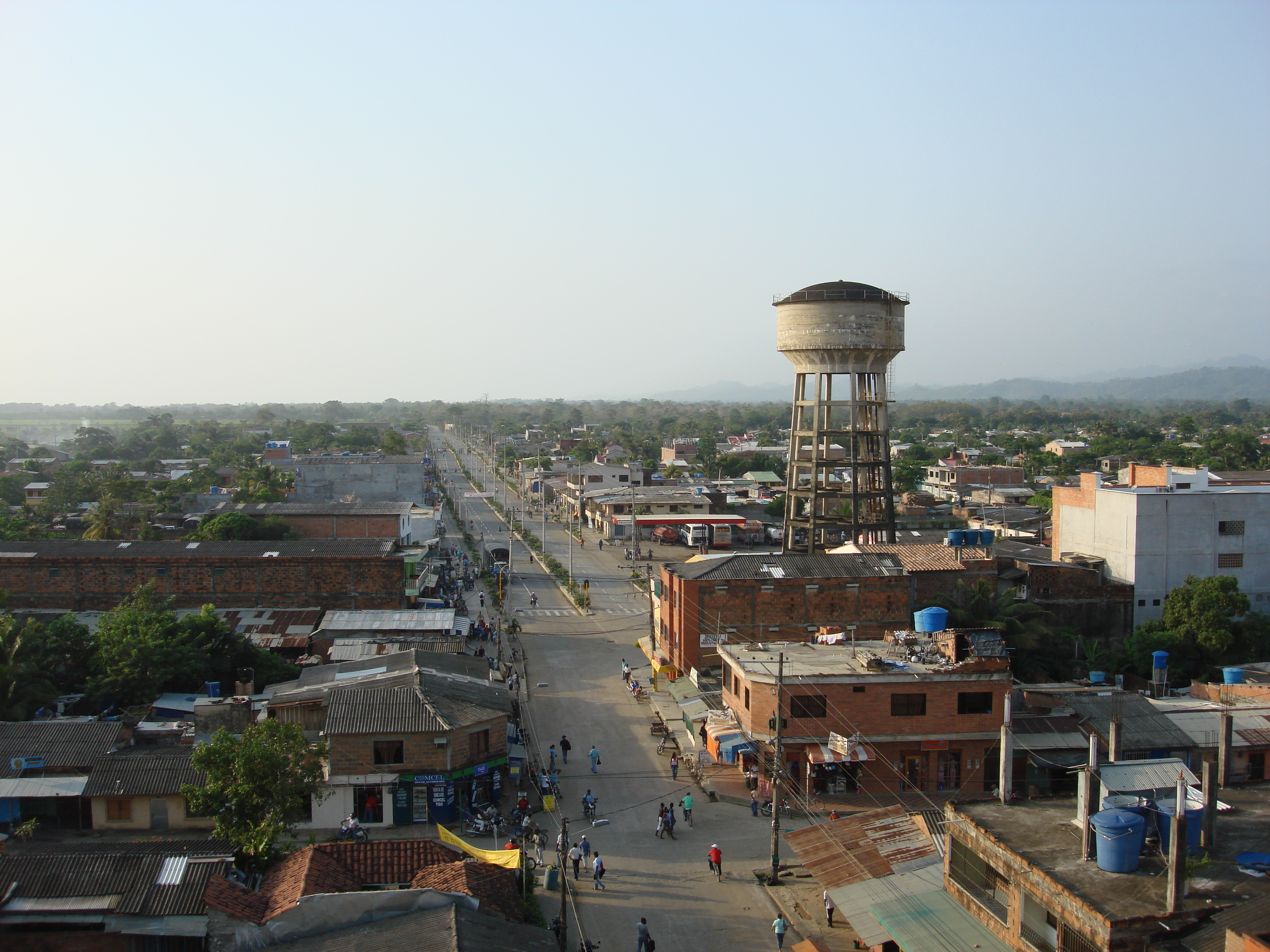
- Panoramic

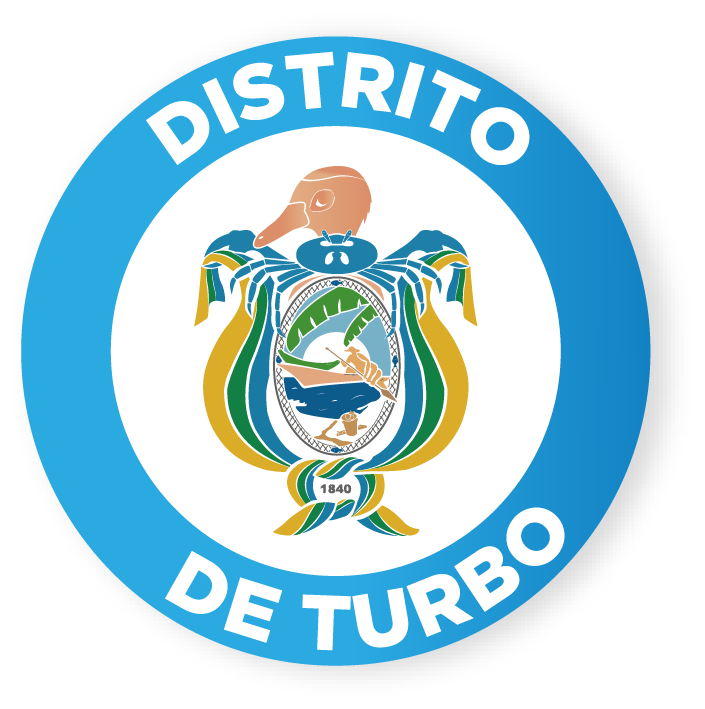
- Flag Seal

- Location of the city of Turbo, in the Antioquia Department of Colombia

- Location in Colombia
- Coordinates: 8°6′0″N 76°44′0″W
- Country: Colombia
- Department: Antioquia Department
- Subregion: Urabá

Area
  - Metro: 3,055 km^{2} (1,180 sq mi)
- Elevation: 2 m (6.6 ft)

Population (2016)
  - City: 163,525
  - Density: 41.25/km^{2} (106.8/sq mi)
  - Urban: 65,307
- Time zone: UTC−5 (Colombia Standard Time)

Turbo is a port city in Antioquia Department, Colombia. Part of the Urabá Antioquia sub-region, it is located on the coast of Gulf of Urabá, 340 km north of Medellín (the department capital and second largest city). Serving as the capital of the Urabá region within Antioquia. Historically, the area now known as Turbo was once called Pisisi, but the name Turbo was in use by 1741. On May 11, 1839, the central government allocated one thousand pesos for the construction of military service barracks in Turbo. In 1840, the republican president assigned one thousand fanegas of uncultivated lands for the new population. Turbo was officially established as a municipality in 1847.

Turbo lies near the southeastern tip of the Darién Gap and is the northern terminus of the main route of the Pan-American Highway in South America. There is currently no road connecting through the region to Yaviza, Panama, where the highway continues through Central and North America.

Map of the Darién Gap and the break in the Pan-American Highway between Yaviza, Panama and Turbo, Colombia.

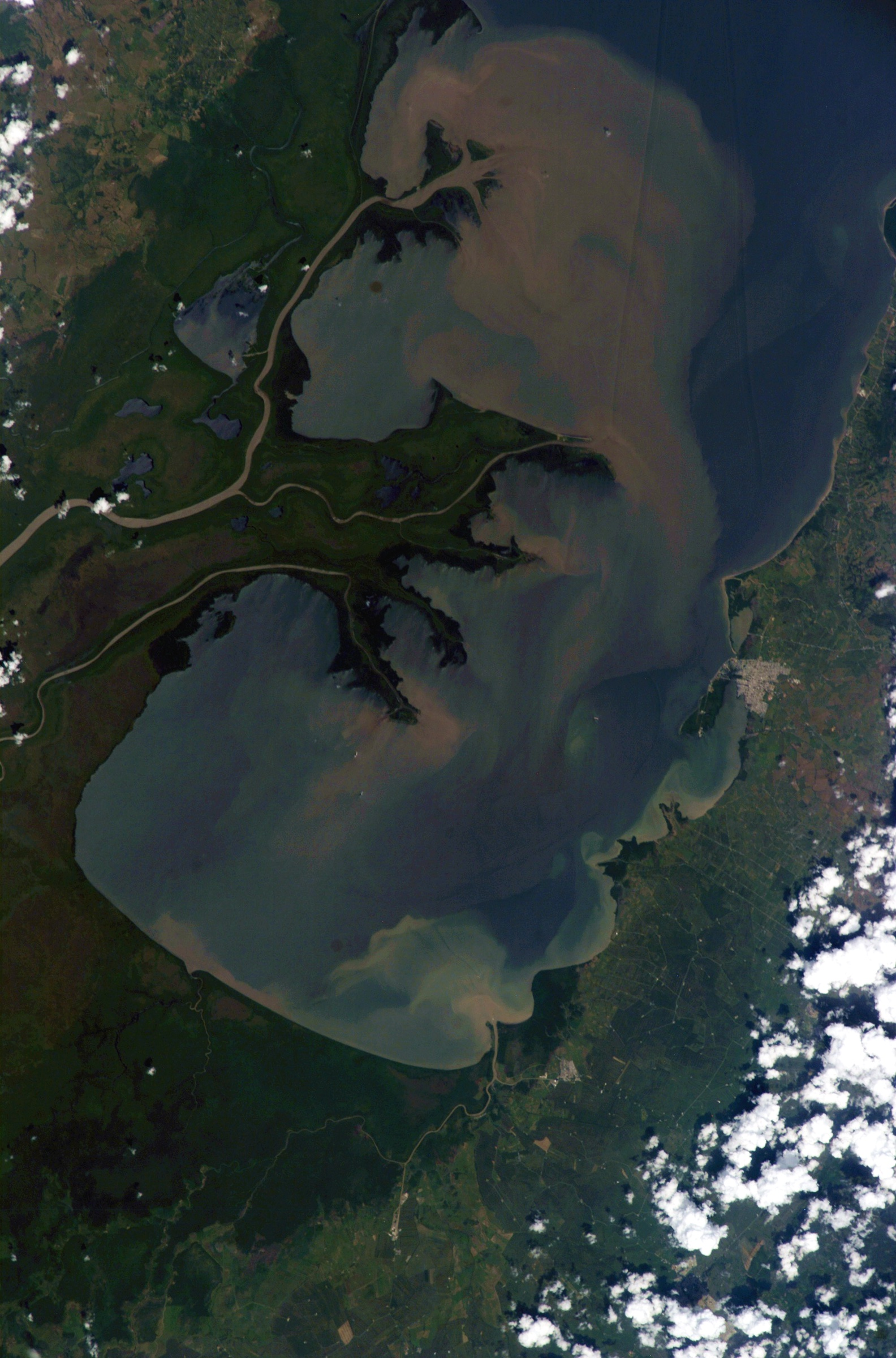
Turbo is on the eastern coast of the Gulf of Urabá

== Geography ==
=== Climate ===
Turbo has a monthly mean temperature above 18 °C or 64 °F in every month of the year and a distinct dry season, with the driest month measuring less than 60 millimetres or 2.4 inches of precipitation. The Köppen climate classification subtype for Turbo’s climate is Am (tropical monsoon climate), although it borders on Af (tropical rainforest climate). The average temperature for the year in Turbo is 81.0 °F or 27.2 °C, with extremely small variations through the year. Rainfall in Turbo is heavy due to strong surface westerly winds from the Intertropical Convergence Zone (ITCZ) located near Turbo’s latitude, although it is much less from January to March when the ITCZ reaches its most southerly latitude, resulting in the town’s classification as a monsoon climate.

Climate data for Turbo, elevation 37 m (121 ft), (1981–2010)
Month	Jan	Feb	Mar	Apr	May	Jun	Jul	Aug	Sep	Oct	Nov	Dec	Year
Mean daily maximum °C (°F)	31.0 (87.8)	30.8 (87.4)	30.9 (87.6)	31.2 (88.2)	31.7 (89.1)	31.6 (88.9)	31.7 (89.1)	31.7 (89.1)	31.9 (89.4)	32.2 (90.0)	31.7 (89.1)	31.2 (88.2)	31.5 (88.7)
Daily mean °C (°F)	27.2 (81.0)	27.2 (81.0)	27.3 (81.1)	27.5 (81.5)	27.4 (81.3)	27.5 (81.5)	27.2 (81.0)	27.4 (81.3)	27.4 (81.3)	27.3 (81.1)	27.2 (81.0)	27.1 (80.8)	27.3 (81.1)
Mean daily minimum °C (°F)	23.8 (74.8)	23.9 (75.0)	24.3 (75.7)	24.3 (75.7)	24.0 (75.2)	23.8 (74.8)	23.7 (74.7)	23.5 (74.3)	23.6 (74.5)	23.4 (74.1)	23.5 (74.3)	23.7 (74.7)	23.8 (74.8)
Average precipitation mm (inches)	79.8 (3.14)	50.0 (1.97)	75.6 (2.98)	235.2 (9.26)	290.7 (11.44)	252.5 (9.94)	218.6 (8.61)	265.1 (10.44)	217.6 (8.57)	184.0 (7.24)	230.6 (9.08)	193.9 (7.63)	2,230.6 (87.82)
Average precipitation days (≥ 1.0 mm)	5	5	7	13	17	15	16	17	15	14	14	10	140
Average relative humidity (%)	86	85	85	86	88	87	86	87	86	87	87	87	87
Source: Instituto de Hidrologia Meteorologia y Estudios Ambientales
