= Atrato River =

River in northwestern Colombia

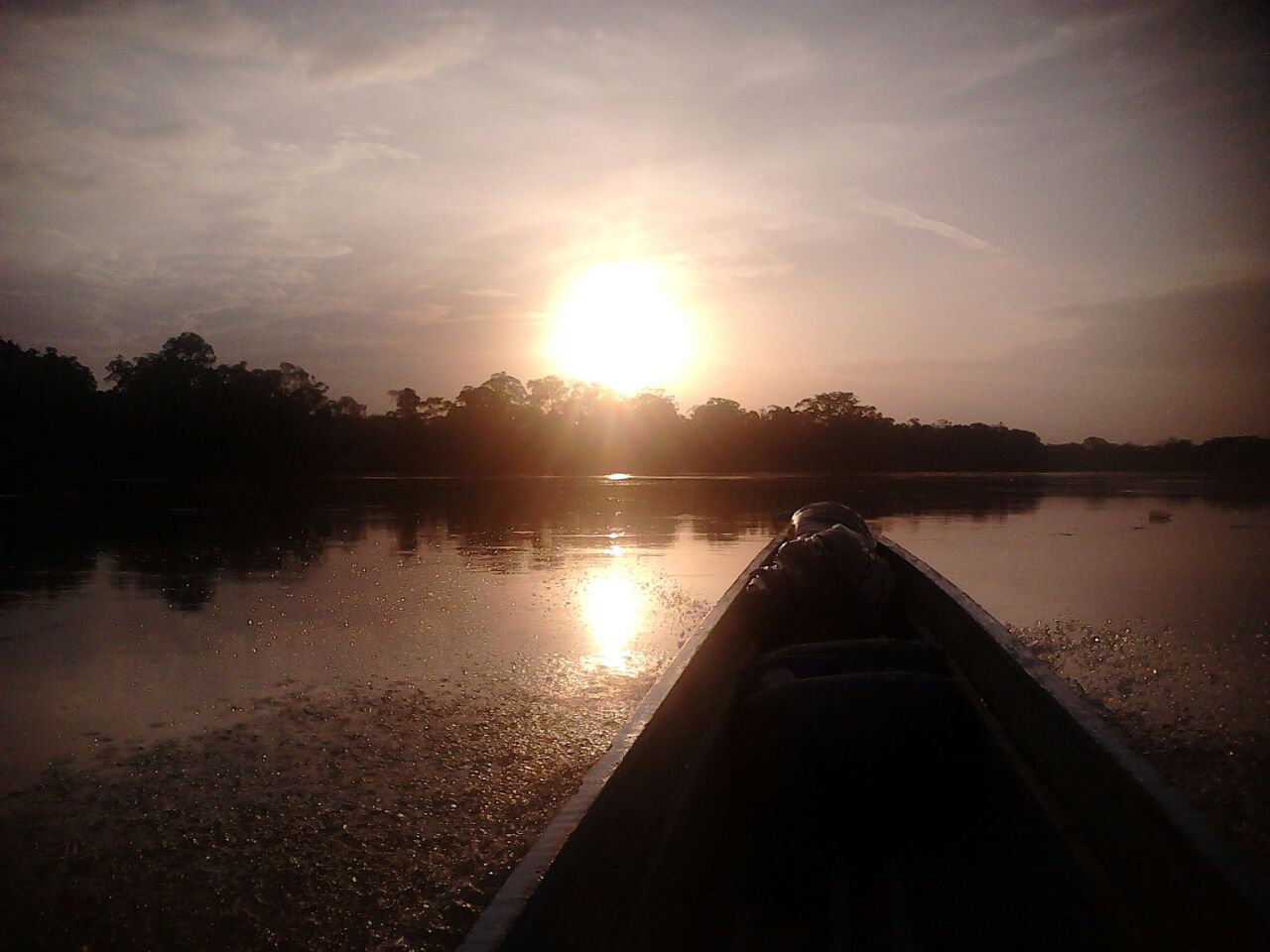

Location
- Country: Colombia

Physical characteristics
- Source
  - location: Colombia
- Mouth
  - location: Caribbean Sea, Colombia
  - coordinates: 8°10′45.2″N 76°56′28.7″W
- Length: 750 km (470 mi)
- Basin size: 37,810 km^{2} (14,600 sq mi) 35,996.7 km^{2} (13,898.4 mi^{2})
- Discharge
  - location: Atrato Delta, Gulf of Urabá, Colombia
  - average: 3,993 m^{3}/s (141,000 cu ft/s) 3,767.992 m^{3}/s (133,065.4 cu ft/s)

Basin features
- Tributaries
  - left: Truando
  - right: Murrí, Sucio

Rivers in Colombia. Atrato is in the far northwest of the country near the Panama border

The Atrato River (Spanish: Río Atrato) is a river of northwestern Colombia. It rises in the slopes of the Western Cordillera and flows almost due north to the Gulf of Urabá (or Gulf of Darién), where it forms a large, swampy delta. Its course crosses the Chocó Department, forming that department's border with neighboring Antioquia in two places. Its total length is about 650 km (400 mi), and it is navigable as far as Quibdó (400 km / 250 mi), the capital of the department.

In 2016, the Constitutional Court of Colombia granted the river legal rights of personhood after years of degradation of the river basin from large-scale mining and illegal logging practices, which severely impacted the traditional ways of life for Afro-Colombians and Indigenous people.

== Drainage area ==
The river’s total length is about 650 km (400 mi), and it is navigable as far as Quibdó (400 km / 250 mi), the capital of the department. The basin occupies an area of 37,810 km^{2} (14,600 mi^{2}) and has an average annual precipitation of >5,000 mm/year that reaches up to 12,000 mm/year in the upper basin.

Flowing through a narrow valley between the Cordillera and coastal range, it has only short tributaries, the principal ones being the Truandó, the Sucio, and the Murrí rivers.

The gold and platinum mines of Chocó line some of its confluence, and the river sands are auriferous. Mining and its toxic leavings have adversely affected river and environmental quality, damaging habitat for many species and affecting the ethnic groups, the predominantly Afro-Colombian and Native American indigenous peoples who live along the river. The river is one of the few ways to move around in the Chocó region.

== Wildlife ==
Northwestern Colombia encompasses an area of great diversity in wildlife. During the Pleistocene era at the height of the Atrato river, where it intersected the Cauca-Magdalena, the area was covered by a sea. It is proposed that this created a geographic barrier that may have caused many species to diverge through the process of allopatric speciation. For example, Philip Hershkovitz proposed that the cotton-top tamarin (Saguinus oedipus) and the white-footed tamarin (Saguinus leocopus) diverged because of the rise of the Atrato, and today they are principally separated by the river.

Andinoacara biseriatus, a cichlid, can be found in the river.

== History ==
In the 19th and early 20th centuries, the San Juan and the Atrato rivers attracted considerable attention as part of a feasible route for a trans-isthmian canal in Colombia. William Kennish, an engineer and inventor from the Isle of Man and Royal British Navy veteran, proposed an aqueduct making use of the Atrato River and its tributary, the Truando River, to cross the Colombian isthmus. After publishing a report in 1855 on this proposal for a New York firm, he was chosen to guide a US military expedition to explore and survey the proposed project in Colombia. In 1901, the United States government's Isthmian Canal Commission determined that the Atrato River was not suitable for a canal, due to the length of the route (over 100 miles) and the large amount of silt carried by the river, and recommended Nicaragua and Panama as preferable sites.

In November 2016, the Constitutional Court of Colombia declared the legal personhood of the Atrato River possessing the rights to ‘’protection, conservation, maintenance, and restoration.'' While the Colombian Constitution does not explicitly recognize Rights of Nature [RoN], ruled that it is a set of ‘’biocultural rights’’ that can be inferred from guarantees in the constitution for biodiversity, cultural, and humanitarian protections. The ‘biocultural rights’’ claim emphasized that the cultural rights of Colombian Indigenous and Afro-Colombian citizens, and the biological rights of the Atrato River are inextricably linked. As a result, Judge Palacio ruled that the biocultural rights should support the conservation, restoration, and sustainable development of the Atrato River

The ruling transpired from the degradation of the river basin from large-scale mining and illegal logging practices, which severely impacted the traditional ways of life for Afro-Colombians and Indigenous people. Illegal logging changed the flow of the river, and illicit mining increased the level of toxic chemicals [i.e., mercury and cyanide] entering the river system, causing a threat to the biodiversity of the area, and adversely impacting the health of the vulnerable people of these societies, including children

The court referred to New Zealand’s Te Awa Tupua Act (Whanganui River Claims Settlement) and cited New Zealand’s recognition of the Whanganui River’s legal personhood as precedent. Following that example, the court ordered the creation of a guardian body – the Commission of the Guardians of Atrato River, to represent the interests of the river, and manage the river’s resources in a sustainable way that is consistent with the river’s legal personhood status. Initially, the commission would include government representatives and one community representative. However, civil society rejected the idea of just one community and instead made a request for fourteen council members to serve on the council. The request was approved, and the council was formed in May 2018.

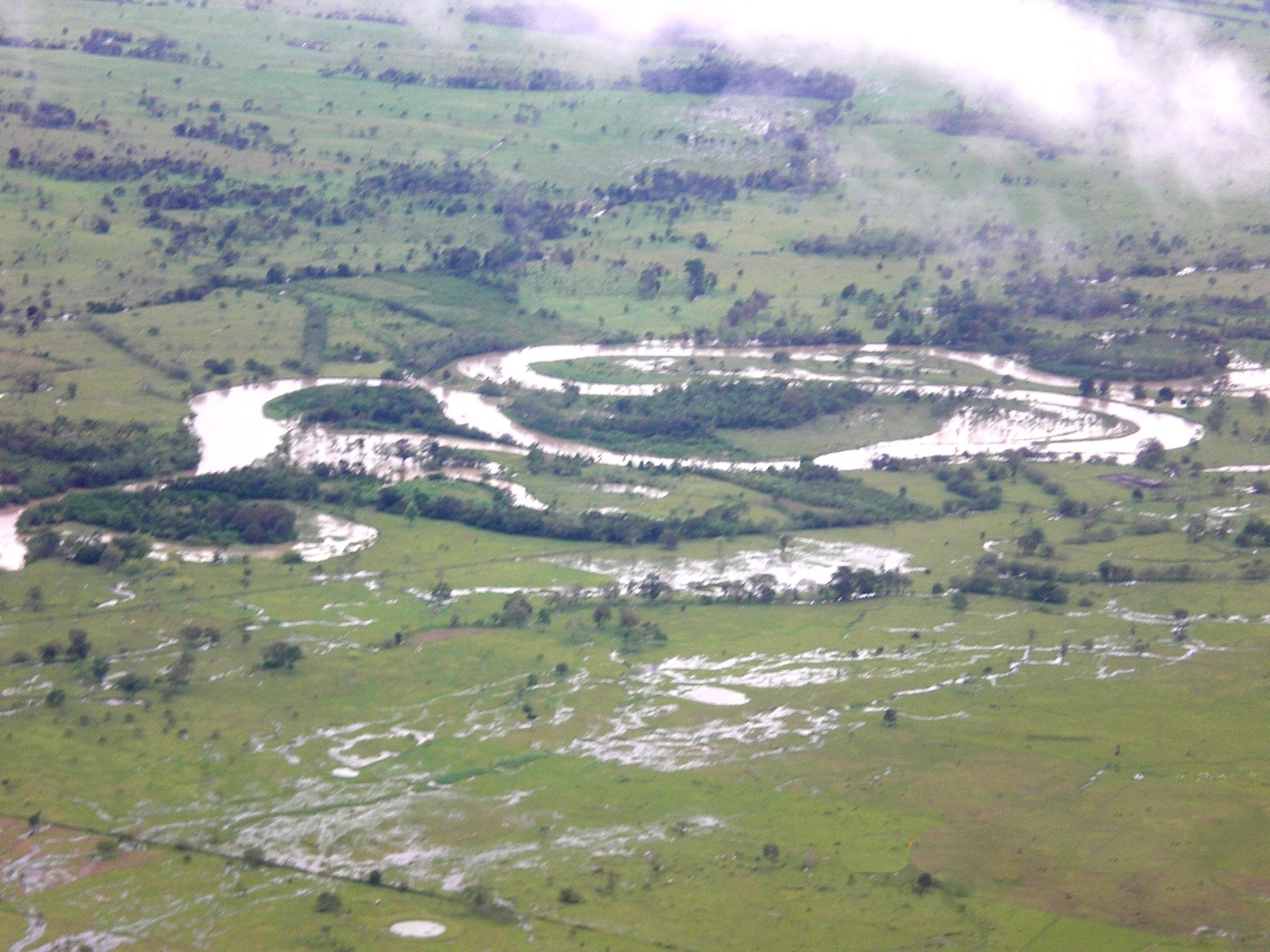
The Atrato River

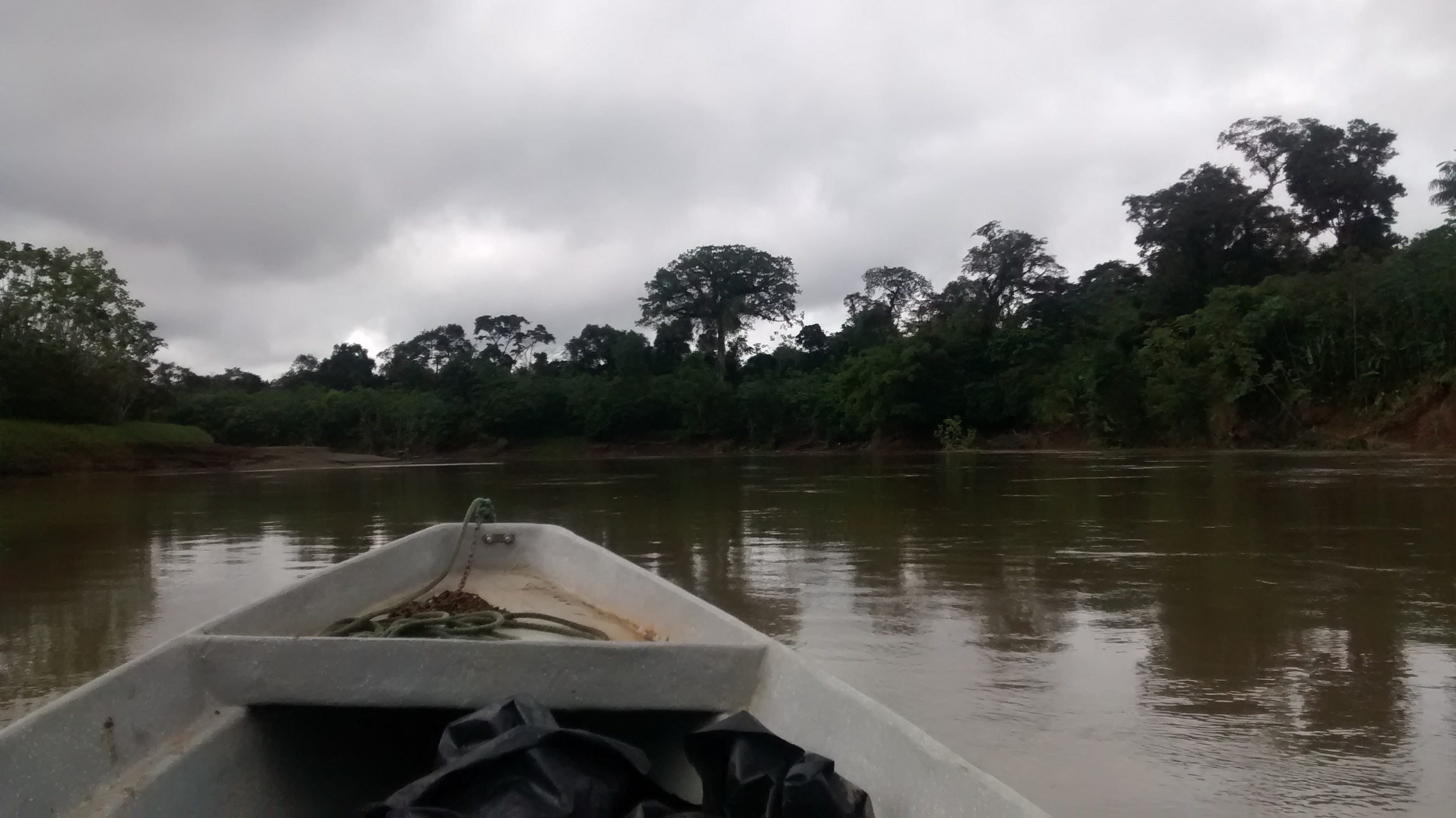
View from a side branch, in the Medio Atrato region

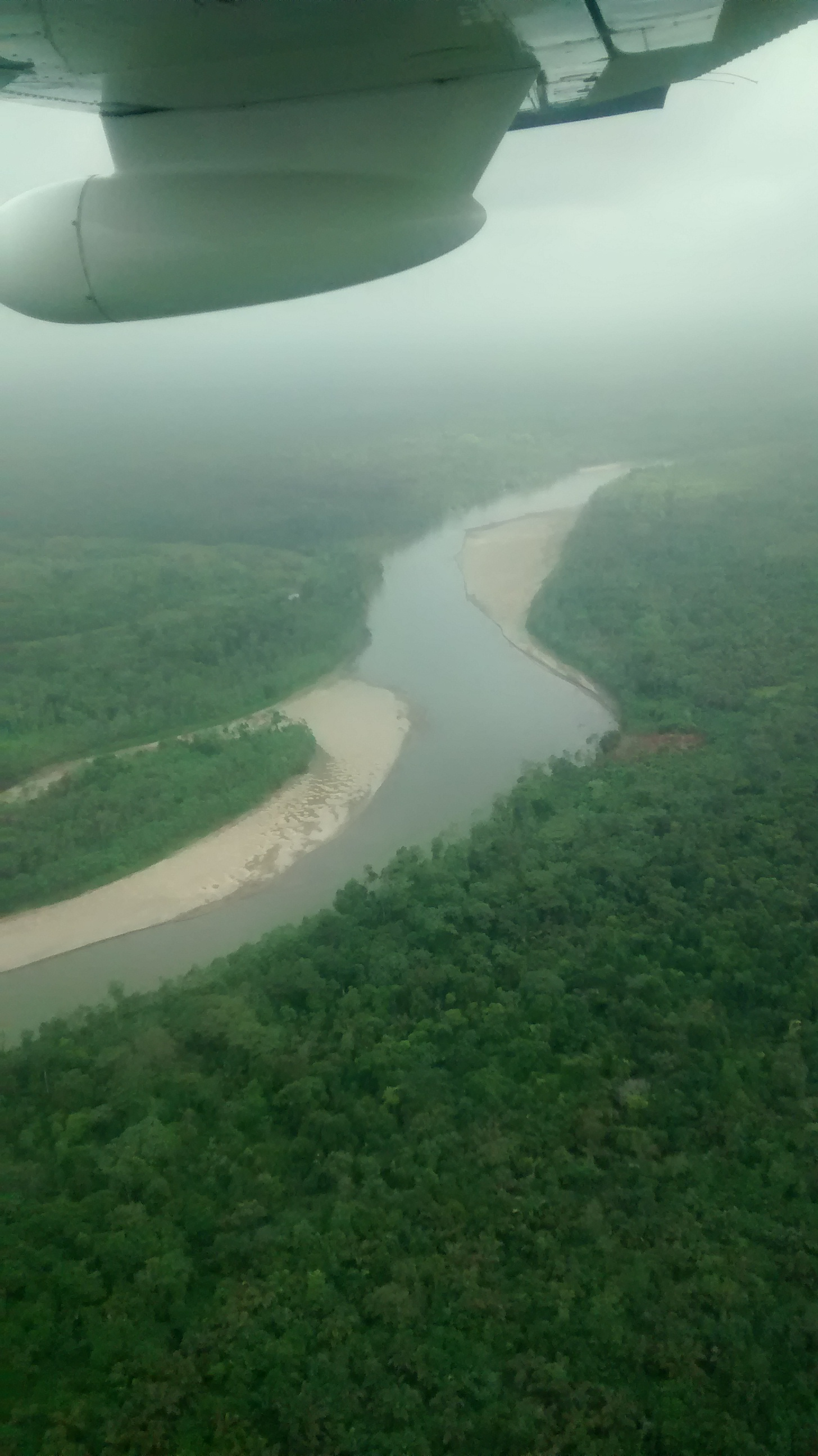
The river seen from above, Medio Atrato region.

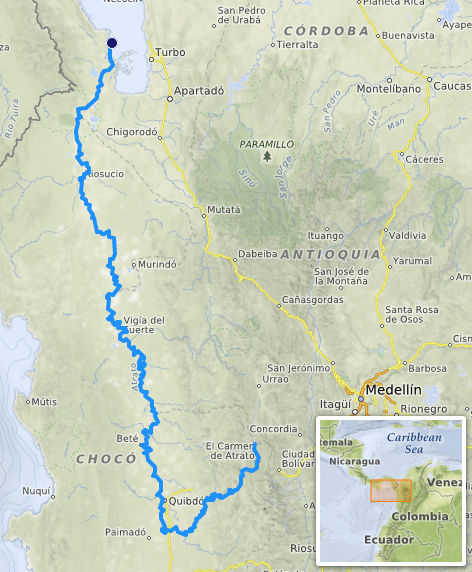
Atrato river rises in the slopes of the Western Cordillera, flows to the Gulf of Urabá and total length is about 650 km (400 mi).
