= Comandos de la Frontera =

Border Commandos
- Comandos de la Frontera
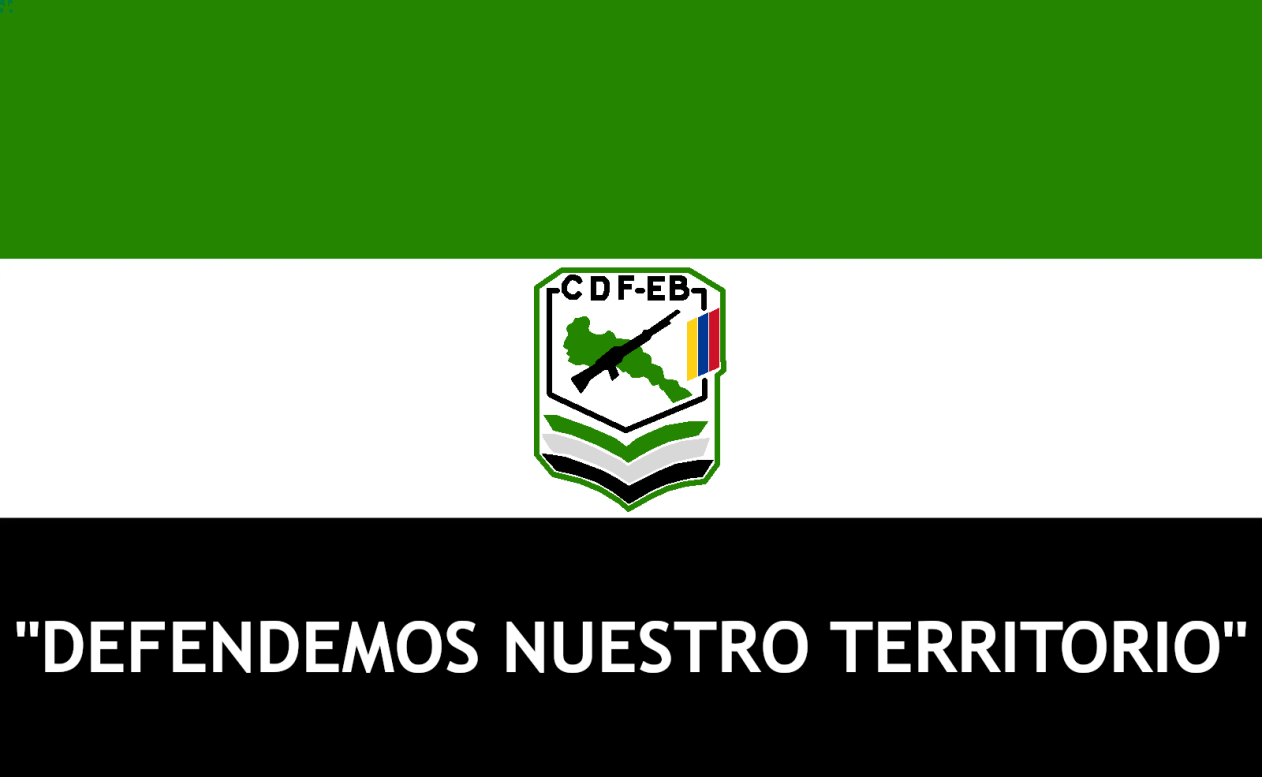
- Founded: 2017; 9 years ago As La Mafia; September 2020; 6 years ago As Border Commandos
- Founder: Henry Loaiza-Ceballos
- Founding location: Colombia: Amazonas, Caquetá, Putumayo and Nariño Departments. Ecuador: Carchi and Sucumbíos Provinces.
- Years active: 2020–present
- Territory: Colombia, Ecuador, Peru
- Leaders: Mono Tole; Pedro Oberman Goyes; Giovanny Andrés Rojas
- Activities: Organized crime, narcotrafficking, assassinations, extortion, forced recruitment
- Allies: Segunda Marquetalia

The Comandos de la Frontera (CDF; English: Border Commandos), (Note: also known as La Mafia (English: The Mafia) or La Mafia Sinaloa (English: The Sinaloa's Mafia)) or Comandos de la Frontera-Ejército Bolivariano, is a criminal organisation classified as an Organised Armed Group (GAO) by the Colombian government, composed primarily of FARC dissidents, members of La Constru crime gang, and former members of the United Self-Defence Forces of Colombia, as well as former military personnel.

The organisation operates throughout the Putumayo Department and the Colombian-Ecuadorian border. It is known for production and trafficking of cocaine and marijuana, as well as the influence that it exerts, including erecting roadblocks, mandating curfews, the assassination and intimidation of political and social figures, among others.

== History ==
=== Founding of La Constru ===
La Constru is a criminal organisation that began operating from 2017 onwards, formed from members of the United Self-Defence Forces of Colombia—that demobilised in 2006—under the leadership of Henry Loaiza-Ceballos aka "El Alcarán", a former member of the Cali Cartel and the Norte del Valle Cartel. Loaiza-Ceballos, identified as one of the masterminds behind some of the Trujillo Massacres in Valle del Cauca Department, was arrested along with 14 members of La Constru in an operation on June 26, 2019 in Puerto Asís, Putumayo Department. Among the figures detained in that operation was Miguel Antonio Bastidas Bravo aka “Gárgola”, a drug trafficker who had been identified by the authorities as responsible for the flow of cocaine from the municipality to neighbouring Ecuador and Central America.

Before La Constru allied itself with the FARC-EP dissidents, some experts such as InSight Crime attributed the organisation’s rapid rise to its close ties with the political establishment and the security forces, exemplified by cases like that of Colonel Elkin Alfonso Argote of the National Army of Colombia, who, accused of protecting Bastidas Bravo's operations in the region, was merely relieved of his post, but not arrested.

=== Founding of the Border Commandos ===
The Border Commandos emerged from an alliance between dissident factions of the FARC-EP and La Constru, seeking to revive the production and trafficking of coca paste, which had been disrupted by the peace agreement between the Colombian government and the FARC-EP and the destruction of several laboratories by the Colombian Army. Operating under the name La Mafia, they began operation around 2017, attracting former demobilised members of the revolutionary organisations.

It was not until September 2020 that the group publicly branded itself as the Border Commandos, seeking to portray itself as a guerrilla group and potentially distancing itself from past cases of assassinations and public intimidation. Since the CDF was first formed, the group has been in conflict with the Carolina Ramírez Front, a splinter group of the FARC-EP.

The Colombian Ombudsman’s Office made the following characterisation of these organisations:

It has been difficult to identify any kind of continuity with the modus operandi and organisational structure of the now-defunct FARC-EP. To some extent, this may be linked to the lack of political training among its members, and the mechanisms by which its ranks were swelled – which involved rapidly recruiting very young people, or those from other criminal organisations, to carry out control and surveillance tasks in areas of interest.

The criminal organisation describes itself as ideologically centrist and makes it clear that it does not subscribe to left-wing or right-wing doctrines, adding that “Marxist or fascist theories are not accepted within our organisation”. It also states that it accepts “all types of fighters, regardless of their background or combat experience”, provided they are not “enemies of the state”.

=== Relations with other FARC dissidents ===
The Border Commandos have had a fraught relationship with other dissident groups, the best-known being their conflict with the Carolina Ramírez Front, which dates back to 2019 and has had serious repercussions for the region’s inhabitants. According to a report by the Inter-Church Commission for Justice and Peace, sources who requested anonymity state that CDF fighters are supported by military units (particularly in their feud with the Carolina Ramírez Front), and are subjected to constant threats, forced recruitment, false accusations and pressure to accept agreements with the oil company Amerisur Resources (a subsidiary of GeoPark Limited).

In March 2021, the CDF released a video announcing their alliance with Segunda Marquetalia, adopting a new name: "Comandos de la Frontera-Ejército Bolivariano" (English: Border Commandos-Boliviarian Army). They also presented themselves as opponents of corruption, extortion and government economic policies such as fracking.

In February 2025, they broke away from the Segunda Marquetalia to begin peace negotiations with the government.

=== US intervention ===
We are advancing alongside our partners in the fight against narcoterrorism.

I congratulate our joint forces and the Ecuadorian armed forces for the successful operation against narcoterrorists in Ecuador. This collaborative and decisive action is a strategic success for all nations in the Western Hemisphere committed to disrupting and defeating narcoterrorism.

— General Francis Donovan,

On 3 March 2026, United States Southern Command (SOUTHCOM) announced the beginning of a joint operation with the Ecuadorian government against criminal organisations within the country, mainly in Sucumbios Province, on the Colombian border. Strikes were carried out against what President Daniel Noboa claimed were FARC training camps, led by the current leader of the Commandos Mono Tole. Noboa, a close ally of President Trump, who had labelled the US as a "regional ally", held talks with Francis Donovan, commander of SOUTHCOM and Mark A. Schafer, head of US Special Operations in Central and South America and the Caribbean, in Quito preceding the operation.

== Attacks and assassination ==
The CDF (and its predecessor, La Mafia) are identified as the main perpetrators of attacks against social leaders in the Colombian border region; they are also accused of receiving support from the military. One example of their campaigns of violence was the murder of Arturo Tovar Collazos in the village of Los Mangos on 9 January 2020, on the border between the municipalities of Puerto Guzmán and Puerto Caicedo, as well as the murder and attempted murder of other farmers on the same day, in the villages of El Caño Sábalo and Buena Esperanza.

One of the most common tactics used by the CDF to keep rival groups at bay is the setting up of illegal checkpoints and curfews, with the aim of controlling the flow of people and goods passing through their areas of influence. Threats made by armed members against the local population have also been captured on video, and there have been reports of graffiti near the homes of community leaders. The CDF exploited the restrictions imposed due to the COVID-19 emergency in Colombia to expand their area of influence and their activities.

Another murder attributed to the Comandos de la Frontera is the killing of motorcycle taxi driver Segundo Ramírez, which took place on 5 September 2020 in the town centre of Puerto Asís, despite the presence of military patrols in the area. Three days later, Emerson Gómez Álvarez was murdered in the town of Puerto Vega, near Puerto Asís. In October, the CDF were implicated in the murders of Wilfrido Jiménez and Pedro Abel Cañas, which took place between the 12th and 13th of that month; the first in the community of Montebello and the second in the district of Piñuña Blanco, in the municipality of Puerto Asís.

In February of the following year, members of the CDF threatened to dissolve the management board of the Perla Amazónica Peasant Reserve, accompanying this threat with false accusations against the community leaders living in the area.

== Leadership ==
One of the early leaders of the CDF was Pedro Oberman Goyes Cortes, alias "Sinaloa", a dissident from the FARC-EP who turned to cocaine trafficking after leaving the organisation. According to a police source, he rejected the alliance offered to him by FARC dissidents Gentil Duarte and Rodrigo Cadete to rebuild the guerrilla group, because he had no political motivation and wanted to devote himself to drug trafficking. He was reportedly killed by his own men in March 2019, according to the Colombian army, but this account is disputed. He was succeeded by Miguel Antonio Bastidas Bravo, alias “Gárgola,” who remained in charge until his capture later that year. Giovanny Andrés Rojas, alias “Araña” assumed leadership of the criminal organisation until February 2025, when he was also arrested. Mono Tole is the current leader of the CDF.
