= 2017 Mocoa landslide =

Natural disaster in Colombia

- 2017 Mocoa landslide (Colombia)
- Date: 1 April 2017
- Time: ≈03:00 COT (UTC−05:00)
- Location: Mocoa, Colombia; 1°09′0″N 76°38′51″W
- Type: Landslide, flash flood
- Deaths: 336
- Injuries: 332
- Missing: 70

The Mocoa landslide was a natural disaster that took place in 2017. During the pre-dawn hours of 1 April 2017, locally heavy rain triggered flash flooding and landslides in the city of Mocoa, Putumayo, Colombia, killing at least 336 people, injuring 400, and leaving 200 others missing. It is the third-deadliest weather-related disaster in Colombian history, and is regarded as the worst catastrophe in the history of Mocoa.

== Background ==
Situated in the Andes, the department of Putumayo is notorious for deadly landslides. The region's mountainous terrain and frequent rainfall makes it prone to such disasters. Much the same as the Himalayas, the Andean mountains in this region have ultra steep drops, from over 5,000 to 500 metres (16,400 to 1,600 ft) within 50–100 kilometres (31–62 mi), with that kind of drop, heavy rains tend to take boulders at high speeds along with them (locally called huaycos), not just water. Throughout much of the first three months of 2017, the northwestern coast of South America saw above-average rainfall, leading to deadly floods in Peru and Ecuador. The rainy season in Colombia typically begins in mid-March and continues through mid-June. March 2017 proved unusually wet, with areas around Mocoa receiving 150 percent the average monthly rainfall.

== Disaster ==
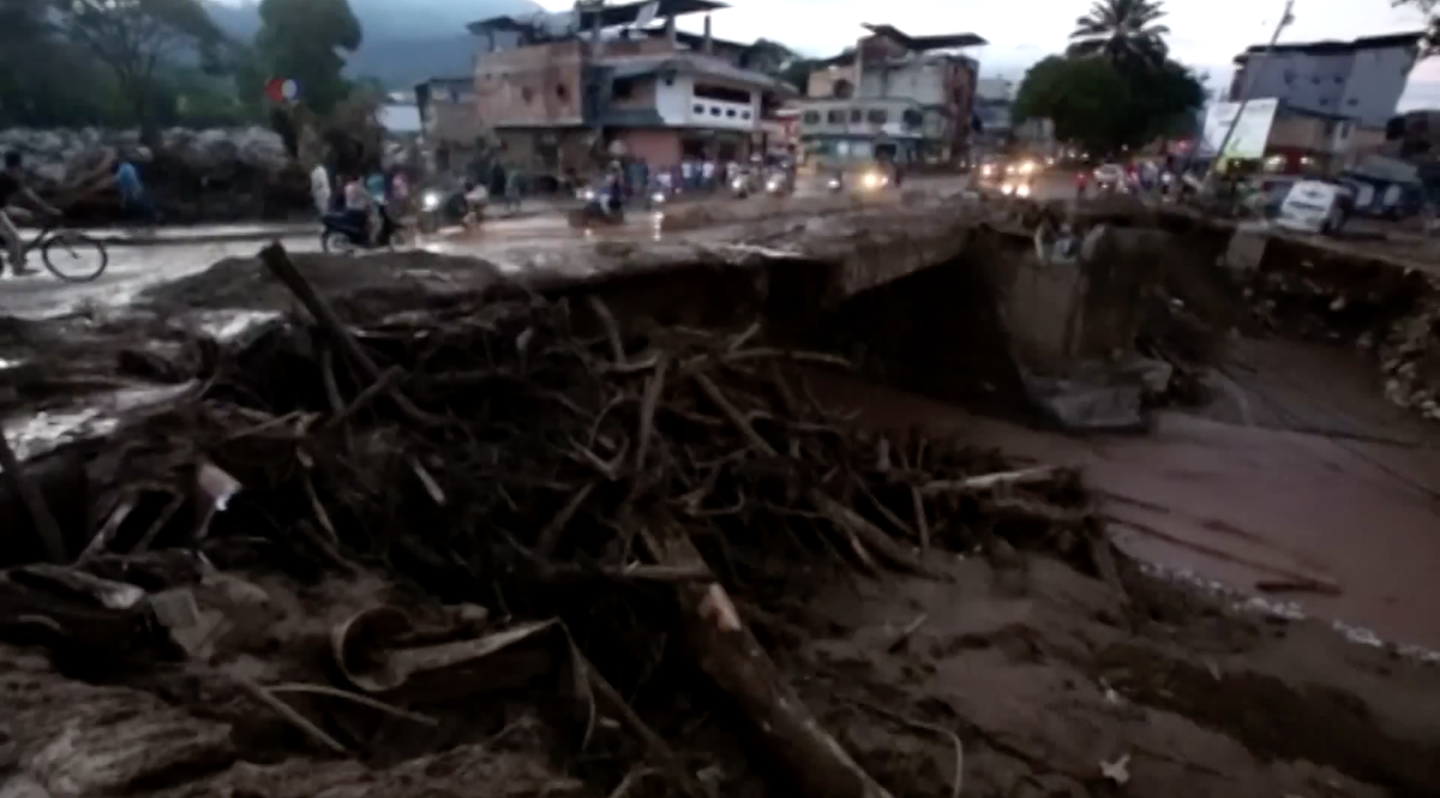
Debris left behind along a previously swollen river in Mocoa

On 31 March, 2017, moist tropical air from the Atlantic Ocean flowed west across the Amazon toward the Andes. A broad swath of ample precipitable water, or atmospheric moisture, extended across this region. During the evening hours, a slow-moving mesoscale convective complex developed within this region and produced heavy rainfall in southern Colombia. Infrared satellite imagery from GOES-13 depicted cloud tops of −90 °C (−130 °F), indicating the storms were capable of producing torrential rain. With the system moving perpendicular to tall mountains, orographic influence likely enhanced rainfall and further contributed to the subsequent disaster. According to residents, the rain became particularly intense between 11:00 p.m. and 1 a.m. local time. A total of 130 millimetres (5.1 in) of rain fell during the event, largely within a few hours. This caused the Mocoa, Sangoyaco and Mulato rivers to overflow and send mudflows towards residences and infrastructure in the city of Mocoa by 3:00 a.m.

Neighborhoods built along the banks of the aforementioned rivers were completely devastated. Numerous poorly constructed homes were leveled, and large portions of the city were left buried in several feet of mud. The disaster adversely affected 17 of the city's neighborhoods, with the mayor of Mocoa, José Antonio Castro, stating some areas "[had] basically been erased". The Independencia neighborhood was entirely destroyed. Approximately 45,000 people were directly affected throughout the city.

At least 329 people are known to have died in the disaster. An additional 332 were injured and a further 70 were missing. At least 22 of the injured were in a "delicate health situation" and transferred to Neiva. Another 21 victims were flown to Popayán.

== Aftermath ==
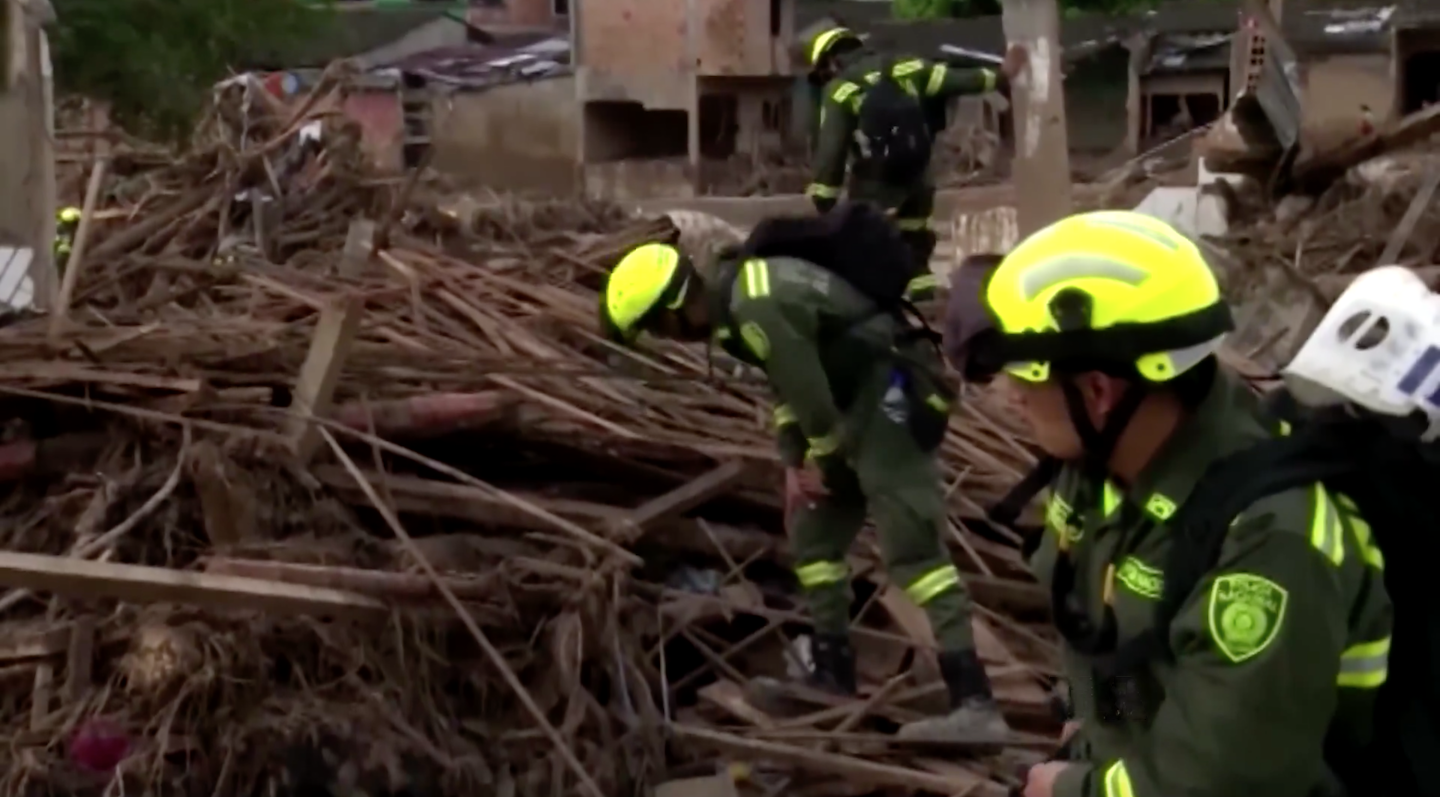
Rescuers combed piles of debris for potential survivors

President Juan Manuel Santos declared a state of emergency and stated that his "heart and the hearts of all Colombians are with the victims of this tragedy." More than 1,100 soldiers and police officers deployed to assist in search and rescue efforts. Santos labeled the incident "a disaster caused by nature, by climate change." A temporary morgue was established to handle the large number of deceased. The Colombian Red Cross activated its National Crisis Room in response to the disaster and deployed a team of 47 people to assist in recovery. Hospitals in the city were overwhelmed with the influx of patients, and much of the area was left without power and water.

By 2 April, more than 2,500 personnel — including 1,400 soldiers and 800 police officers — were scouring debris for survivors. The army provided 63 vehicles, 10 helicopters, 7 boats, and 6 planes for the rescue operation. Médecins Sans Frontières deployed an assessment team to the affected area on 2 April.

Around 400 members of the rebel group Revolutionary Armed Forces of Colombia offered to help rebuild Mocoa, but required approval from the government of Colombia to do so.

== See also ==
- 1985 Puerto Rico floods – Flood event that took place in Puerto Rico
- Armero tragedy – 1985 volcanic eruption in Colombia
- January 2011 Rio de Janeiro floods and mudslides
- Vargas tragedy – 1999 natural disaster in Venezuela
