= 2016–17 South American floods =

Natural disasters in South America

2017 South America floods
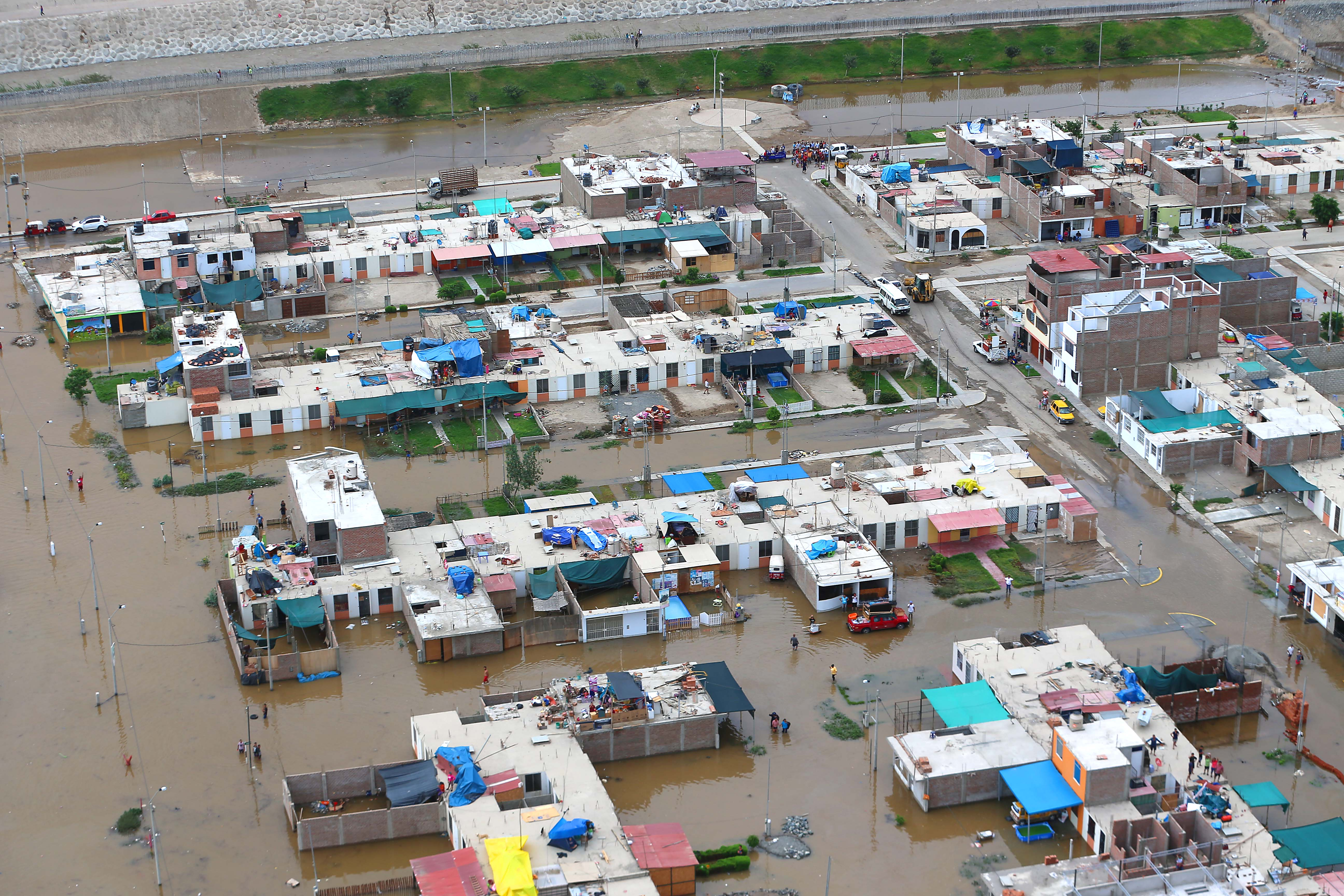
- Flooding in La Tinguiña District, Peru
- Date: December 2016 – May 2017
- Location: Much of South America, most notably Ecuador and Peru
- Deaths: ≥418 deaths, >824 injuries, 361 missing

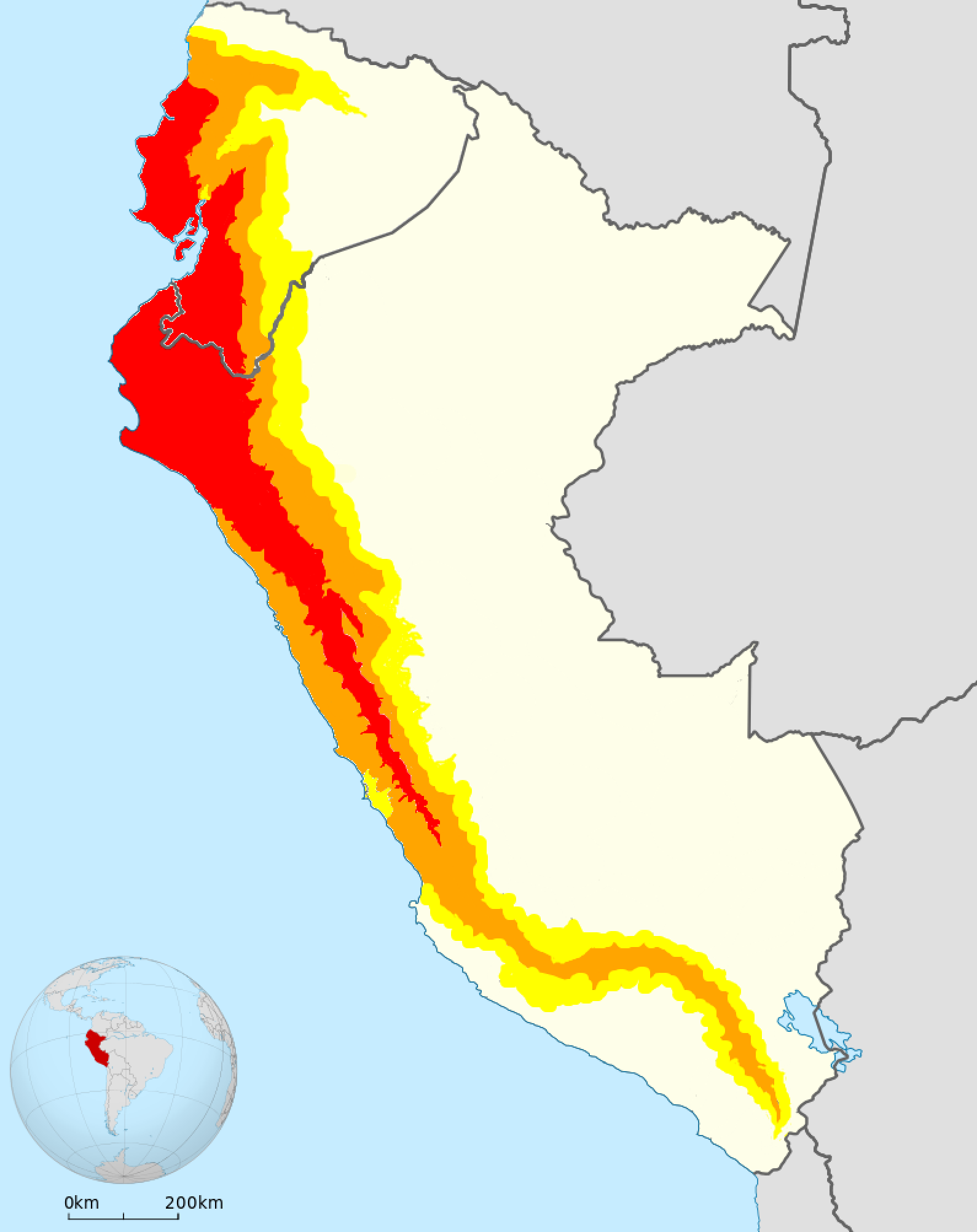
The most impacted areas in Ecuador and Peru. Mildly impacted areas Moderately impacted areas Severely impacted areas

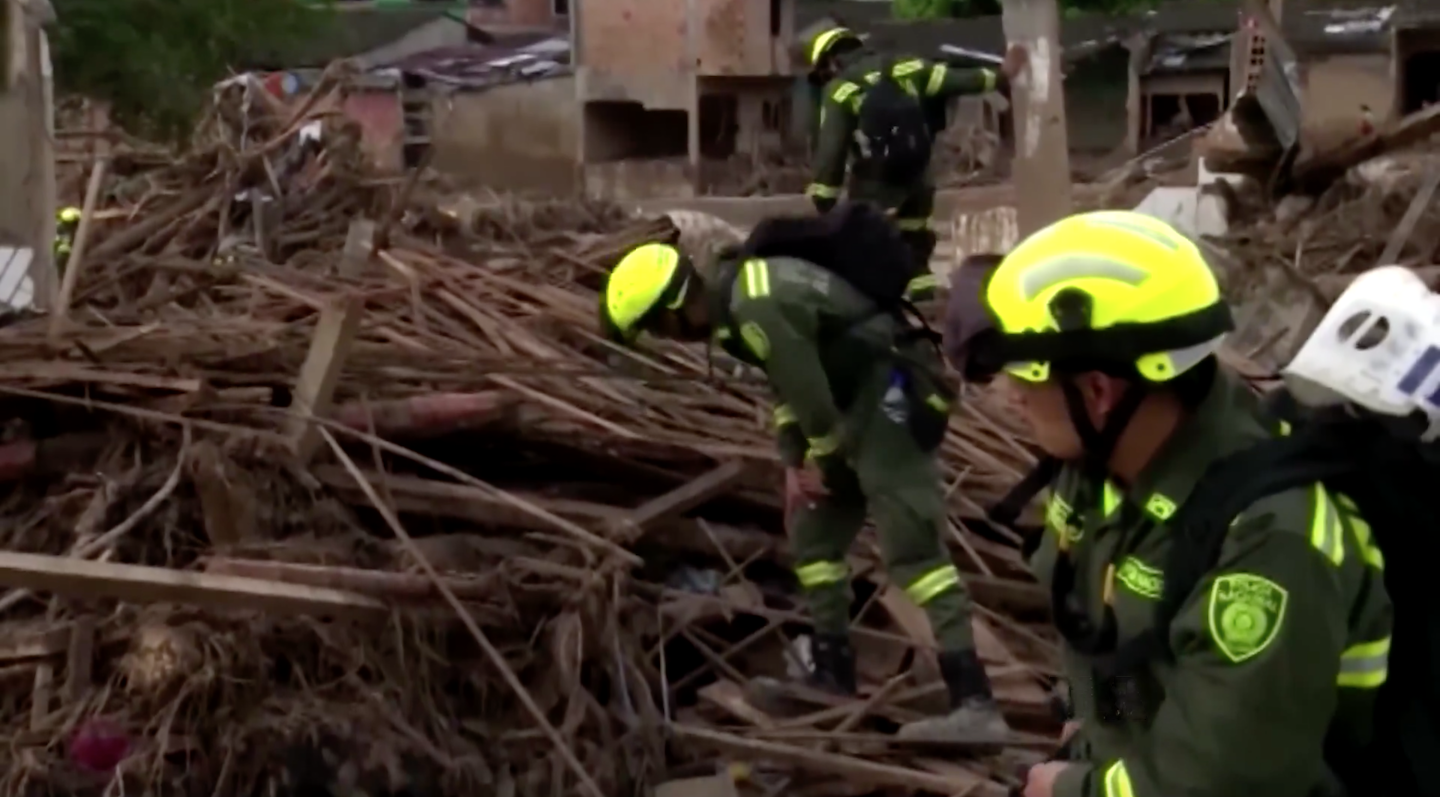
Rescuers searching through debris for survivors of the Mocoa landslide

From December 2016 and continuing until May 2017, much of western and central South America was plagued by persistent heavy rain events. In Peru, one of the most severely impacted nations, it has been referred to as the 2017 Coastal Niño (Spanish: El Niño costero de 2017). The flooding was preceded by drought-like conditions throughout the region for much of 2016 and a strong warming of sea temperatures off the coast of Peru.

== Background ==
From 2014 to 2016, the Pacific Ocean experienced a significant El Niño event. By June 2016, the El Niño had subsided but lingering drought-like conditions persisted through the southern spring in late 2016. Starting in November 2016, a localized anomalous warming of the Pacific occurred which is known locally as the Coastal Niño. A Coastal Niño is differentiated from an El Niño event in that the Coastal Niño is localized to the coasts of Ecuador and Peru and does not expand into the equatorial central Pacific Ocean or impact global temperatures. This ocean warming contributed to unseasonably high rainfall in the region and, by January 2017, Peruvian officials had declared the warming a Coastal Niño occurrence.

== Climatology ==
=== A previous situation: The 2014-16 Niño ===
Before the Coastal Niño occurred there was another phenomenal event, the Global Niño. This Niño lasted from November 2014 until May 2016, was cataloged as very strong and nicknamed the "Superniño," or "Godzilla Niño," due to its very large area of warming. This Niño broke numerous worldwide temperature records and in a particular moment, for instance, February 2016, raised the temperatures of the American Pacific coast from Alaska to Chile.

In spite of the fact that this Niño was categorized as very intense, it did not gravely affect the South American coasts due to the fact that its center developed in the equatorial central Pacific. Nearing the end of this Global Niño the abnormal heat of the ocean moved towards the coasts of Peru, initiating there the Coastal Niño event.

=== Duration ===
The abnormal warming had been present on the coasts of Peru since June 2016, however, in agreement with the Peruvian studies, it is considered that the Coastal Niño event officially lasted from December 2016 until May 2017. The most activity occurred between January and March 2017, and the areas affected the most were the Peruvian regions of Piura, Lambayeque and La Libertad.

On the other hand, the abnormal warming appeared later on the coasts of Ecuador, lasting only from January 2017 until April 2017. In both countries, the most critical episode took place in March 2017. For these reasons, this event is also simply known as the 2017 Niño.

=== Origin ===
The strong rains originated due to the warming of the ocean that borders the Pacific coasts of Peru and Ecuador, a phenomenon referred to as the Coastal Niño. The rise in the ocean's temperature is linked with air currents, of Central American origin, that move in the southern direction. These currents assist with the warming of the sea and with the arrival of warm waters from Asia and Oceania. As they passed by the coasts of Ecuador and Peru, the warm water currents didn't encounter a sufficiently strong trade wind barrier that could prevent their forceful arrival. The warm water is characterized to be superficial and to evaporate easily; it also increases temperatures to 29 degrees Celsius which generates an unstable atmosphere and constant rain.

== Precedents: 1891 and 1925 Niños ==
A precedent of the 2017 Coastal Niño, would be the 1891 Meganiño, named thusly the "1891 Downpour" or the "1891 Flood". This event would have been a Coastal Niño due to the fact that it was a phenomenon that in a localized manner largely affected the Peruvian coast, but without a larger influence on the global climate it probably would not be related to the weather pattern referred to as ENSO, (El Niño-Southern Oscillation). The 1891 event was the first of the era that was scientifically studied thanks to the Geographic Society of Lima. It lasted from February to April and would have been caused by the abnormal oceanic heating influenced by the currents of El Niño. The NOAA considers the precedent of 1891 as a warming event of Peru that is within the most severe events to have occurred in the last 300 years. It caused large disasters and more than two thousand casualties in Peru.

The 1925 Niño was also a Coastal Niño that affected Peru and Ecuador between the months of February and April. It originated from the appearance of the currents of El Niño, where a rapid warming of the sea took place, with the development of the phenomenon during the simultaneous event of the Global Niño (this contradiction is called the Modoki Niña). Equal to that which occurred in 2017 it weakened the southern trade winds, with an intense development of the tropical rain belt and a corresponding association to an intense Intertropical Convergence Zone (ITCZ) south of the equator.

== Impacts ==
=== Colombia ===
On December 1, 2016, heavy rains in Cali triggered a landslide that claimed at least six lives. All the fatalities took place in the Siloe neighborhood where 14 homes were destroyed.

During the overnight of March 31 – April 1, heavy rain affected parts of the Putumayo Department. A total of 130 mm (5.1 in) of rain fell within a few hours near the city of Mocoa. This caused the Mocoa, Sangoyaco, and Mulata rivers to overflow and send mudflows towards residences and infrastructure in the city of Mocoa by 3:00 a.m. Multiple neighborhoods were devastated in the disaster, with numerous residents caught off-guard. By the morning of 6 April, at least 301 people were known dead (including 92 children), more than 400 were injured (including 167 children), and a further 314 were missing.

=== Ecuador ===
In Ecuador, at least 16 people were killed by floods or landslides. Coastal Manabí declared a state emergency and the country's largest city, Guayaquil in Guayas experienced abnormally high rain events. Higher elevation regions including Quito experienced severe rains, landslides, and sinkholes towards the tail end of the Coastal Niño event as the ITCZ began moving north towards its more usual latitude.

=== Peru ===
Much of the coastal desert region of Peru was particularly hard-hit with incessant, heavy rains starting in January 2017. Most impacted were the regions of Tumbes, Piura, and Lambayeque where a state of emergency was declared on February 3, 2017. These equatorial parts of Peru are typically dry throughout the summer but can be greatly impacted by climatic changes when adjacent ocean warms and the equatorial trough oscillates further north. During these occurrences, monsoon-like rains can fall in usually bone-dry ecosystems causing mudslides locally known as huaycos. The 2017 Coastal Niño was the worst to hit Peru since 1925. More than 115,000 homes were demolished, leaving approximately 178,000 people homeless. A total of 113 people were killed, 354 were injured, and a further 18 were missing. More than 2,500 kilometers (1,500 miles) of roads were destroyed and an estimated 1.1 million people have been directly affected by the floods. The United Nations Office for the Coordination of Humanitarian Affairs noted that 3 million people were at-risk for waterborne diseases.

On March 16, a mudflow buried the village of Barbablanca; however, all 160 residents escaped. On March 27, 2017, the Piura River broke its banks and flooded the city of Piura and the towns of Catacaos and Pedregal Chico. In Piura, 300 mm (12 in) of rain fell in one day, three times the city's annual average and Catacaos had flood waters rise to 1.8 m (5.9 ft) high. Further south, La Libertad, Áncash, and Lima were also impacted. Trujillo experienced severe localized flooding in its ravines and Huarmey was badly flooded.

=== Elsewhere ===
In Brazil, Heavy rains on March 11–13, 2017, including 110 mm (4.3 in) in 24 hours, caused flooding across Rio Grande do Sul, killing 2 people, injuring 70, and leaving 10 others missing.

Further south, in Chile, unusually heavy rains affected areas around Santiago starting in February 2017. Flooding and landslides killed at least eighteen people and left few others missing.

== Disasters ==
From the beginning of the Coastal Niño, the Peruvian and Ecuadorian coasts have seen the effects of various disasters which have caused hundreds of fatalities and thousands of damages.

=== Destruction ===
The landslides, overflow and displacement of earth intensified especially in the basin of the Pacific. This phenomenon initially only affected the populations that lived near mountain valleys, but as the situation worsened the landslides continued until they reached cities cut off from the mountains, like Huaraz.

=== Torrential rain and thunderstorms ===
Torrential rains accompanied the thunderstorms that began in the regions of northern Peru such as Lambayeque, La libertad, and Piura as well as in the provinces of the south of Ecuador such as El oro, Lloja, and Azuay. Many of these experienced for the first time heavy rains with lightning, in particular, the Metropolitan District of Guayaquil. Gradually various parts of both countries where rain is scarce, such as the provinces of Lima and Tacna, also experienced heavy rainfall. Other cities that are commonly rainy, like Quito and Riobamaba, recorded historic levels of precipitation 5 to 6 times greater than normal.

The Peruvian Amazon rainforest also faced a significant rise in rain.

The hailstorms began in the southern Peruvian regions and Puno was affected the most. The Pujno authorities found themselves obliged to close schools and avoid travel on highways. In the final days several inhabitants of Lima warned the authorities of the accumulation of large quantities of a white mass on the peaks of the mountain ranges of Lima.

The Ecuadorian city of Cuenca also recorded a strong hailstorm that paralyzed traffic and obliged the municipal authorities to declare a state of emergency suspending classes in schools, colleges and universities.

=== Floods ===
Virtually all of Peru and Ecuador experienced repeated flooding due to the overflow of rivers and ravines caused by the rain and the mudslides that easily transported water to them.
