= Orito Airport =

- IATA: none; ICAO: SKOR; LID: ORI

Summary
- Airport type: Public
- Serves: Orito, Colombia
- Elevation AMSL: 1,132 ft / 345 m
- Coordinates: 0°40′00″N 76°52′37″W

Map
- Location of the airport in Colombia

Runways
| Direction | Length | | Surface |
| Direction | m | ft | Surface |
|---|---|---|---|
| 16/34 | 760 | 2,493 | Asphalt |
- Source: GCM Google Maps

Orito Airport (ICAO: SKOR) is an airport serving the town of Orito in the Putumayo Department of Colombia.

The airport is adjacent to the town. The Orito non-directional beacon (Ident: ORI) is located 3.8 nautical miles (7.0 km) east of the airport.

== See also ==
- Transport in Colombia
- List of airports in Colombia
