= Medicinal Plants Orito Ingi-Ande Flora Sanctuary =

Protected area in Colombia

Santuario de Flora Plantas Medicinales Orito Ingi-Ande
- Medicinal Plants Orito Ingi-Ande Flora Sanctuary
- IUCN category III (natural monument or feature)
- Location within Colombia
- Nearest city: Pasto, Colombia
- Coordinates: 00°50′N 76°52′W
- Area: 1,020 km^{2} (390 sq mi)
- Established: 12 June 2008
- Governing body: SINAP

Medicinal Plants Orito Ingi-Ande Flora Sanctuary (Spanish: Santuario de Flora Plantas Medicinales Orito Ingi-Ande) is a protected area in Colombia. The sanctuary is localized in Southern Colombia, Departments of Putumayo and Nariño in the municipalities of Orito (Putumayo) and Funes & Pasto in (Nariño) south side of Cerro Patascoy. In this area they keep medical plants from harm and destruction.

The Sanctuary was established to protect rare plants and animals, including medicinal plants like the yoco plant.
