= Carlos Jacanamijoy =

Colombian painter (born 1964)

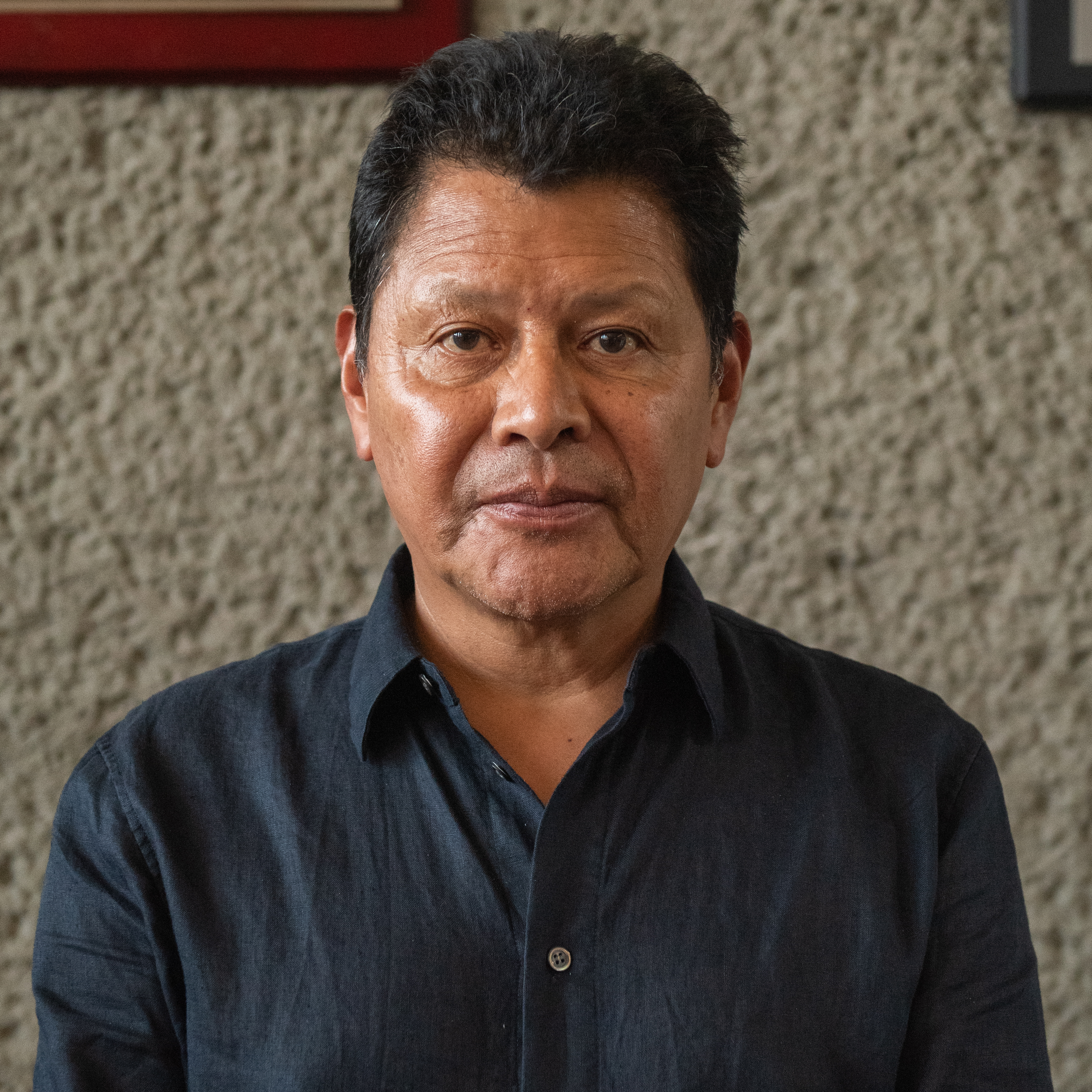
- Born: 1964 (age 61–62); Santiago, Putumayo, Colombia
- Education: University of La Sabana; National University of Colombia

Carlos Jacanamijoy (born 1964 in Santiago, Putumayo) is a Colombian painter of native South American origin of the Inga people. His artwork has been exhibited in more than 25 individual shows and is part of the permanent collection of the National Museum of the American Indian as well as several Colombian museums. He lives and works in Bogotá.

== Education ==
Jacanamijoy started his higher education in fine arts at the Universidad de La Sabana in Bogotá between 1983 and 1984. The following year he moved to the southern Colombian city of Pasto to continue his studies in fine arts at the University of Nariño.

Between 1986 and 1990 Jacanamijoy received a Master in Plastic Arts from the National University of Colombia in Bogotá. In 1989 he also began studying philosophy and literature at La Salle University, graduating in 1990.

== Exhibitions ==
- The George Gustav Heye Center, National Museum of the American Indian, Off the Map: Landscape in the Native Imagination, New York, 2007.
- Luis Ángel Arango Library, Bank of the Republic, Bogotá, Colombia.
- Museum of Modern Art of Bogotá, Colombia.
- La Tertulia Museum, Cali, Colombia.
- Museum of Modern Art, Pereira, Colombia.
- Museum of Art, National University of Colombia, Bogotá, Colombia.
- District Planetary, Bogotá, Colombia.

== Quote ==
"I remember listening, among lights and shadows, to the cacophony of animals during an overwhelming night in the middle of the jungle. My inspiration is, on one side, my experiences in my studio, on the other, a succession of memories of the jungle in Putumayo. It is this constant trail of memory and dreams passing by in my mind when I am in front of that other window: the empty canvas."–Carlos Jacanmijoy, 2007

== Notes ==
=== References ===
- Serrano, Eduardo. Jacanamijoy Villegas Editores (Bogota) (2003) ISBN 978-958-8156-27-9.
