= San Miguel, Putumayo =

Coordinates: 0°20′37″N 76°54′39″W

San Miguel
- Municipality and town
- Flag Coat of arms

- Location of the municipality and town of San Miguel in the Putumayo Department of Colombia.
- Country: Colombia
- Department: Putumayo Department
- Elevation: 380 m (1,250 ft)
- Time zone: UTC-5 (Colombia Standard Time)

San Miguel (Spanish pronunciation: [ˈsam miˈɣel]) is a town and municipality located in the Putumayo Department, Republic of Colombia.

The municipality borders the country of Ecuador.
