= San Francisco, Putumayo =

Coordinates: 1°10′29″N 76°52′47″W

- Municipality and town
- Flag Seal

- Location of the municipality and town of San Francisco, Putumayo in the Putumayo Department of Colombia.
- Country: Colombia
- Department: Putumayo Department
- Elevation: 2,179 m (7,149 ft)
- Time zone: UTC-5 (Colombia Standard Time)

San Francisco (Spanish pronunciation: [saɱ fɾanˈsisko]) is a town and municipality located in the Putumayo Department, Republic of Colombia.
