= Santiago, Putumayo =

Santiago
- Municipality and town
- Flag Coat of arms

- Location of the municipality and town of Santiago, Putumayo in the Putumayo Department of Colombia.
- Coordinates: 1°8′49″N 77°0′4″W
- Country: Colombia
- Department: Putumayo Department

Area
  - Total: 445 km^{2} (172 sq mi)
- Elevation: 2,150 m (7,050 ft)

Population (Census 2018)
  - Total: 6,836
  - Density: 15.4/km^{2} (39.8/sq mi)
- Time zone: UTC-5 (Colombia Standard Time)

Santiago is a town and municipality located in the Putumayo Department, Republic of Colombia. It is the birthplace of Inga painter, Carlos Jacanamijoy.
