= Colón, Putumayo =

Coordinates: 1°11′25″N 76°58′26″W

- Municipality and town
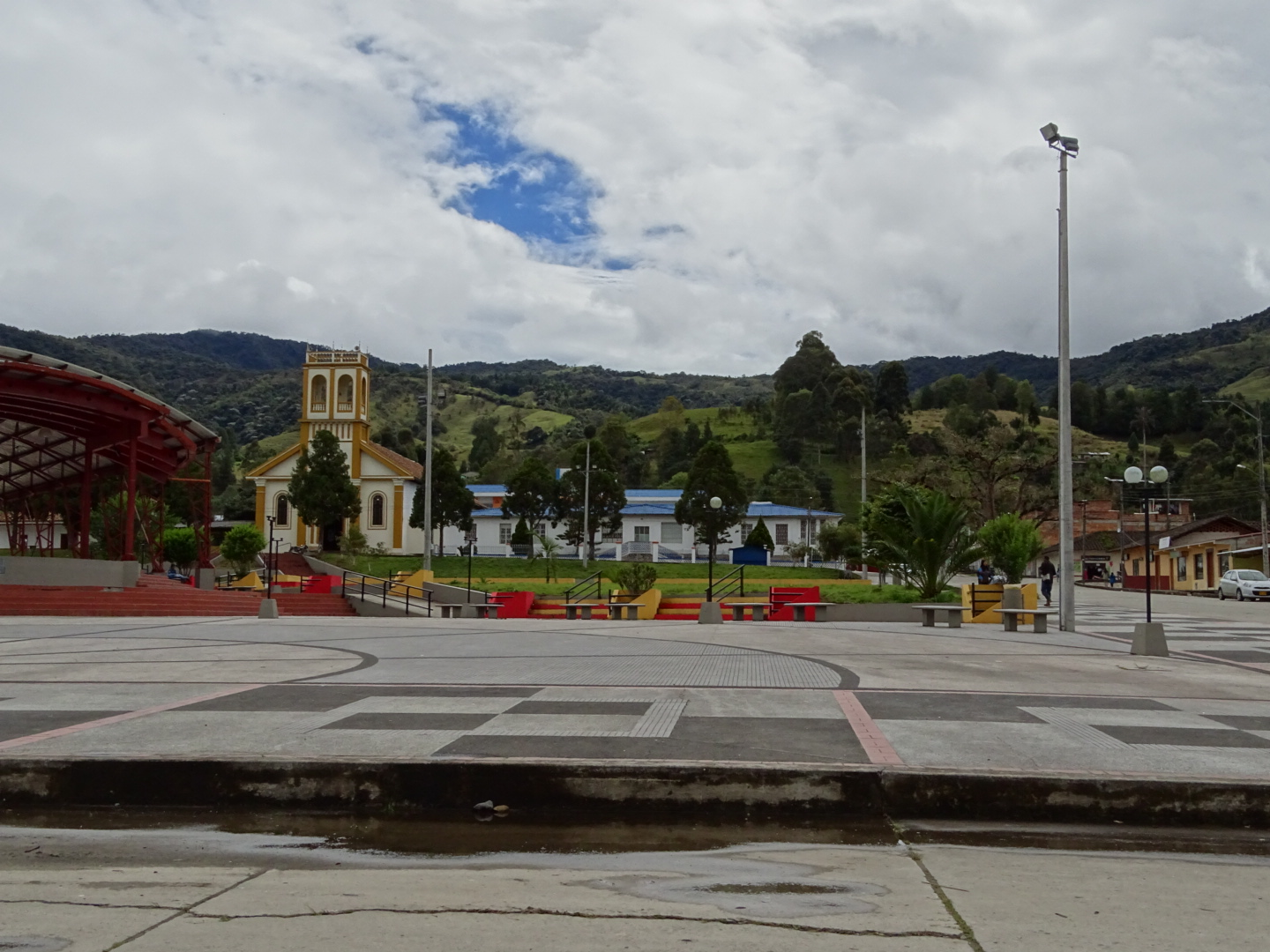
- View of Colón, Putumayo

- Flag Coat of arms

- Location of the municipality and town of Colón, Putumayo in the Putumayo Department of Colombia.
- Country: Colombia
- Department: Putumayo Department
- Elevation: 2,215 m (7,267 ft)
- Time zone: UTC-5 (Colombia Standard Time)

Colón is a town and municipality located in the Putumayo Department, Republic of Colombia.

== Climate ==
Climate data for Colón (Michoacan), elevation 2,100 m (6,900 ft), (1981–2010)
Month	Jan	Feb	Mar	Apr	May	Jun	Jul	Aug	Sep	Oct	Nov	Dec	Year
Mean daily maximum °C (°F)	21.5 (70.7)	21.2 (70.2)	21.0 (69.8)	20.9 (69.6)	20.3 (68.5)	19.7 (67.5)	19.1 (66.4)	19.2 (66.6)	20.0 (68.0)	21.1 (70.0)	21.6 (70.9)	21.3 (70.3)	20.6 (69.1)
Daily mean °C (°F)	16.2 (61.2)	16.1 (61.0)	16.0 (60.8)	16.0 (60.8)	15.7 (60.3)	15.2 (59.4)	14.8 (58.6)	14.9 (58.8)	15.3 (59.5)	15.9 (60.6)	16.4 (61.5)	16.3 (61.3)	15.7 (60.3)
Mean daily minimum °C (°F)	11.2 (52.2)	11.3 (52.3)	11.3 (52.3)	11.6 (52.9)	11.6 (52.9)	12.0 (53.6)	10.8 (51.4)	10.7 (51.3)	10.6 (51.1)	11.1 (52.0)	11.6 (52.9)	11.5 (52.7)	11.3 (52.3)
Average precipitation mm (inches)	85.8 (3.38)	102.8 (4.05)	120.5 (4.74)	156.0 (6.14)	175.7 (6.92)	185.6 (7.31)	179.8 (7.08)	140.6 (5.54)	116.7 (4.59)	100.5 (3.96)	110.8 (4.36)	96.2 (3.79)	1,571 (61.85)
Average precipitation days	19	18	22	24	26	26	26	25	22	20	20	20	261
Average relative humidity (%)	86	85	86	87	87	88	88	88	86	85	85	86	86
Mean monthly sunshine hours	99.2	76.2	62.0	60.0	52.7	36.0	37.2	52.7	63.0	86.8	99.0	99.2	824
Mean daily sunshine hours	3.2	2.7	2.0	2.0	1.7	1.2	1.2	1.7	2.1	2.8	3.3	3.2	2.3
Source: Instituto de Hidrologia Meteorologia y Estudios Ambientales
