= Valle del Guamuez =

Coordinates: 0°25′31″N 76°54′19″W

- Municipality and town
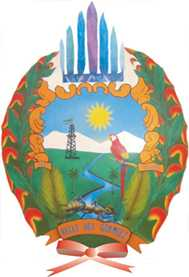
- Flag Coat of arms

- Location of the municipality and town of Valle del Guamuez in the Putumayo Department of Colombia.

- Location in Colombia
- Country: Colombia
- Department: Putumayo Department
- Founded: January 22, 1954

Government
  - Mayor: Jeurin Zan Meneses Gomez

Area
  - Municipality and town: 871 km^{2} (336 sq mi)

Population (2015)
  - Municipality and town: 51,842
  - Density: 59.42/km^{2} (153.9/sq mi)
  - Urban: 20,488
- Time zone: UTC-5 (Colombia Standard Time)

Valle del Guamuez is a town and municipality located in the Putumayo Department, in the Republic of Colombia.

== Crime ==
The Sinaloa Mafia is a criminal organisation that has an alliance with La Constru, a criminal groups that controls microtrafficking activities, principally of cocaine in the municipalities of Valle del Guamuez.

== Visitors ==
As of 2025, the UK Foreign, Commonwealth and Development Office advises against all but essential travel to Valle del Guamuez.
