= Mocoa =

- Municipality and city
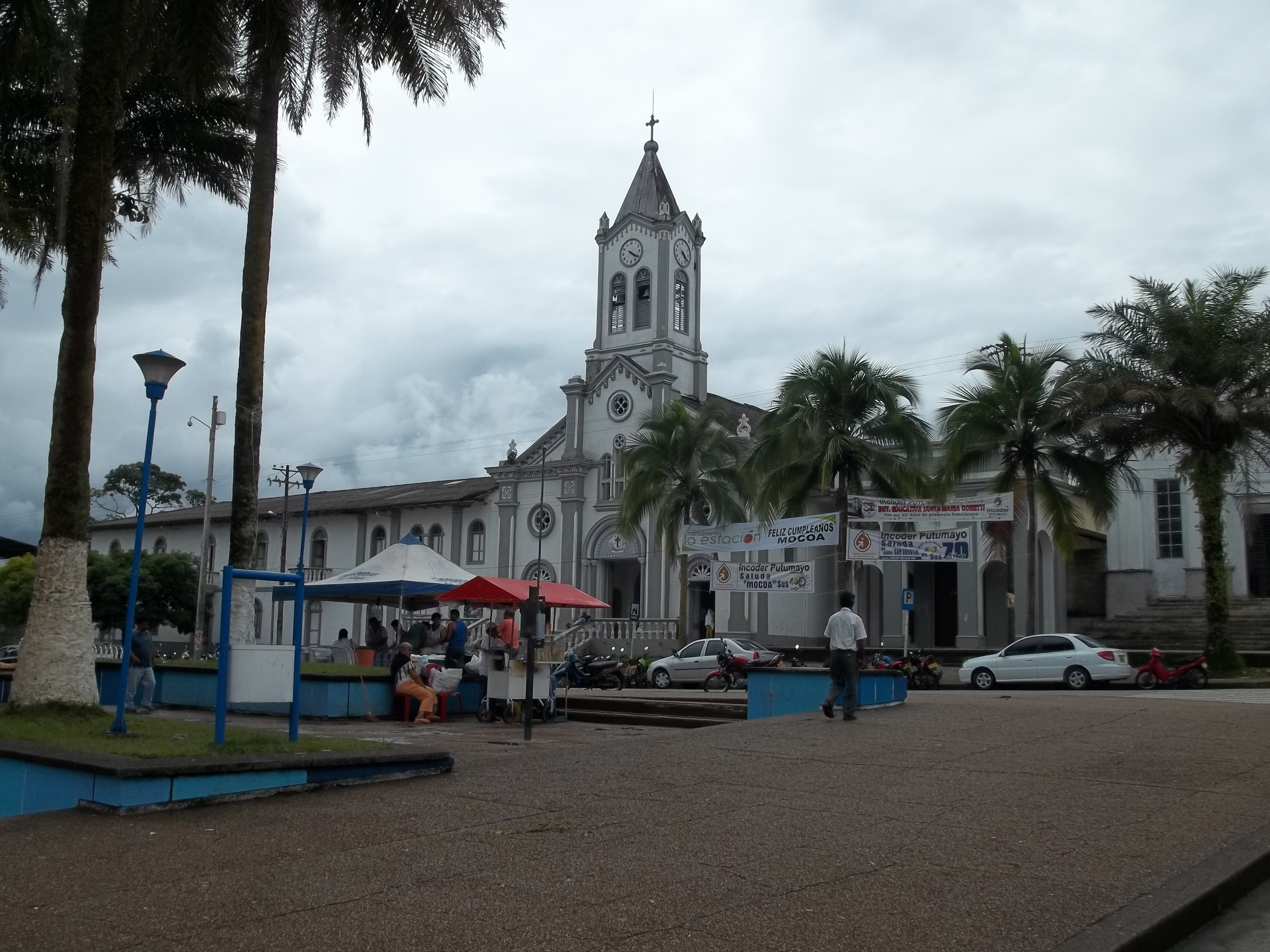
- Plaza Central Mocoa in 2013

- Flag Coat of arms
- Nickname: The Head of Putumayo
- Location of the town and municipality of Mocoa in Putumayo Department.
- Coordinates: 1°09′0″N 76°38′51″W
- Country: Colombia
- Region: Amazonía Region
- Department: Putumayo
- Foundation: 1551

Government
  - Mayor: Jose Antonio Castro

Area
  - Total: 5.613 km^{2} (2.167 sq mi)
- Elevation: 604 m (1,982 ft)

Population (2018)
  - Total: 38,457
  - Density: 6,851/km^{2} (17,750/sq mi)
- Time zone: UTC-05 (Eastern Time Zone)

Mocoa (Spanish pronunciation: [moˈko.a]) (Kamëntšá: Shatjok) is a municipality and capital city of the department of Putumayo in Colombia. As per the 2018 census, the population of Mocoa was estimated at 38,457 individuals. The city was founded in 1551 and covers an area of 5.613 km^{2} (2.167 sq mi).

== Geography ==
Mocoa is a municipality and capital city of the department of Putumayo in Colombia. The city was founded in 1551. The municipality covers an area of 5.613 km^{2} (2.167 sq mi). It lies on the fringes of the Andes mountain range in the Caquetá River basin. It is surrounded by Amazon rainforests and flat agricultural and grazing lands. There are several waterfalls, wildlife reserves, and caves surrounding the city.

On 31 March 2017, flooding and mudslides caused significant destruction and left more than 254 people dead, and hundreds missing.

=== Climate ===
Mocoa has mean yearly temperature of 21–21.4 °C (69.8–70.5 °F) with minimum of 16–17 °C (61–63 °F) and maximum of 28–29 °C (82–84 °F). It receives an annual rainfall of 420–460 cm (170–180 in), with majority of the rainfall happening from April to July.

Climate data for Mocoa (Mocoa Acueducto), elevation 650 m (2,130 ft), (1981–2010)
Month	Jan	Feb	Mar	Apr	May	Jun	Jul	Aug	Sep	Oct	Nov	Dec	Year
Mean daily maximum °C (°F)	27.5 (81.5)	27.6 (81.7)	27.2 (81.0)	27.2 (81.0)	26.5 (79.7)	25.8 (78.4)	26.1 (79.0)	26.7 (80.1)	27.7 (81.9)	28.3 (82.9)	28.1 (82.6)	27.9 (82.2)	27.2 (81.0)
Daily mean °C (°F)	23.4 (74.1)	23.4 (74.1)	23.2 (73.8)	23.0 (73.4)	22.6 (72.7)	22.0 (71.6)	21.9 (71.4)	22.3 (72.1)	23.0 (73.4)	23.3 (73.9)	23.4 (74.1)	23.4 (74.1)	22.9 (73.2)
Mean daily minimum °C (°F)	20.3 (68.5)	20.5 (68.9)	20.4 (68.7)	20.4 (68.7)	20.2 (68.4)	19.7 (67.5)	19.3 (66.7)	19.4 (66.9)	19.8 (67.6)	20.3 (68.5)	20.5 (68.9)	20.6 (69.1)	20.1 (68.2)
Average precipitation mm (inches)	200.6 (7.90)	227.1 (8.94)	273.1 (10.75)	383.5 (15.10)	442.3 (17.41)	473.5 (18.64)	411.3 (16.19)	348.0 (13.70)	296.3 (11.67)	237.2 (9.34)	236.0 (9.29)	214.8 (8.46)	3,656.3 (143.95)
Average precipitation days	19	19	23	24	26	26	25	23	20	21	20	21	260
Average relative humidity (%)	85	84	86	86	87	88	87	84	82	82	83	85	85
Mean monthly sunshine hours	99.2	84.7	80.6	81.0	74.4	66.0	74.4	93.0	108.0	117.8	108.0	111.6	1,098.7
Mean daily sunshine hours	3.2	3.0	2.6	2.7	2.4	2.2	2.4	3.0	3.6	3.8	3.6	3.6	3.0
Source: Instituto de Hidrologia Meteorologia y Estudios Ambientales

== Demographics ==
As per the 2018 census, the population of Mocoa was estimated at 38,457 individuals, and increase from approximately 27,104 in 2005. The population consisted of 18,852 males and 19,605 females. About 8,057 (22.7%) of the population was below the age of fourteen, and 2,139 (9%) was above the age of 65 years.

== Transport and economy ==
The city is located off the highway connecting Pasto, the capital of Narino department, to Puerto Asis. In 2009, the San Francisco-Mocoa road corridor was planned at a cost of US$ 54 million intended to serve as another route connecting the Colombian Pacific coast with the Amazon region. The city is served by the Villa Garzón Airport (Cananguchal Airport), which is well connected by road. The city serves as the economic center of the department, whose economy is based on agriculture, and livestock rearing.
