= Orito =

Coordinates: 0°39′58″N 76°52′15″W

- Municipality and town
- Flag Seal

- Location of the municipality and town of Orito in the Putumayo Department of Colombia.
- Country: Colombia
- Department: Putumayo Department
- Founded: 1963

Government
  - Mayor: Manuel Eduardo Ocoro Carabali

Area
  - Municipality and town: 1,939 km^{2} (749 sq mi)
  - Urban: 6.99 km^{2} (2.70 sq mi)
- Elevation: 310 m (1,020 ft)

Population (2018 census)
  - Municipality and town: 37,745
  - Density: 19.47/km^{2} (50.42/sq mi)
  - Urban: 19,833
  - Urban density: 2,840/km^{2} (7,350/sq mi)
- Time zone: UTC-5 (Colombia Standard Time)

Orito is a town and municipality in the Putumayo Department, Republic of Colombia. The town is just south of the confluence of the Patascoy and Luzonyaco Rivers. It is located 43 kilometres (27 mi) north of the border with Ecuador.

The town is served by Orito Airport.

== Climate ==
Orito has a tropical rainforest climate (Köppen Af) with heavy to very heavy rainfall year-round.

Climate data for Orito
Month	Jan	Feb	Mar	Apr	May	Jun	Jul	Aug	Sep	Oct	Nov	Dec	Year
Mean daily maximum °C (°F)	30.1 (86.2)	29.7 (85.5)	29.4 (84.9)	29.2 (84.6)	28.8 (83.8)	28.8 (83.8)	28.8 (83.8)	29.6 (85.3)	30.0 (86.0)	30.3 (86.5)	30.2 (86.4)	30.2 (86.4)	29.6 (85.3)
Daily mean °C (°F)	25.0 (77.0)	24.8 (76.6)	24.6 (76.3)	24.5 (76.1)	24.2 (75.6)	24.2 (75.6)	24.1 (75.4)	24.5 (76.1)	24.9 (76.8)	25.1 (77.2)	25.2 (77.4)	25.2 (77.4)	24.7 (76.5)
Mean daily minimum °C (°F)	19.9 (67.8)	19.9 (67.8)	19.9 (67.8)	19.8 (67.6)	19.7 (67.5)	19.7 (67.5)	19.5 (67.1)	19.4 (66.9)	19.8 (67.6)	20.0 (68.0)	20.3 (68.5)	20.2 (68.4)	19.8 (67.7)
Average rainfall mm (inches)	235.8 (9.28)	256.0 (10.08)	366.6 (14.43)	404.0 (15.91)	406.4 (16.00)	352.4 (13.87)	305.2 (12.02)	233.8 (9.20)	248.9 (9.80)	306.2 (12.06)	321.2 (12.65)	303.2 (11.94)	3,739.7 (147.24)
Average rainy days	13	15	19	20	21	20	18	15	15	15	16	16	203
Source 1: IDEAM
Source 2: Climate-Data.org
