= Puerto Caicedo =

Coordinates: 0°41′6″N 76°36′16″W

- Municipality and town
- Flag

- Location of the municipality and town of Puerto Caicedo in the Putumayo Department of Colombia.
- Country: Colombia
- Department: Putumayo Department

Area
  - Total: 864 km^{2} (334 sq mi)
- Elevation: 230 m (750 ft)

Population (Census 2018)
  - Total: 11,122
  - Density: 12.9/km^{2} (33.3/sq mi)
- Time zone: UTC-5 (Colombia Standard Time)

Puerto Caicedo (Spanish pronunciation: [ˈpweɾto kajˈseðo]) is a town and municipality located in the Putumayo Department, Republic of Colombia.

== Climate ==
Puerto Caicedo has a tropical rainforest climate (Köppen Af) with heavy to very heavy rainfall year-round.

Climate data for Puerto Caicedo
Month	Jan	Feb	Mar	Apr	May	Jun	Jul	Aug	Sep	Oct	Nov	Dec	Year
Mean daily maximum °C (°F)	30.4 (86.7)	29.9 (85.8)	29.6 (85.3)	29.3 (84.7)	28.9 (84.0)	28.9 (84.0)	28.8 (83.8)	29.6 (85.3)	30.1 (86.2)	30.7 (87.3)	30.6 (87.1)	30.6 (87.1)	29.8 (85.6)
Daily mean °C (°F)	25.3 (77.5)	25.0 (77.0)	24.9 (76.8)	24.7 (76.5)	24.4 (75.9)	24.5 (76.1)	24.3 (75.7)	24.6 (76.3)	25.1 (77.2)	25.6 (78.1)	25.6 (78.1)	25.6 (78.1)	25.0 (76.9)
Mean daily minimum °C (°F)	20.2 (68.4)	20.2 (68.4)	20.2 (68.4)	20.1 (68.2)	19.9 (67.8)	20.1 (68.2)	19.8 (67.6)	19.7 (67.5)	20.2 (68.4)	20.5 (68.9)	20.7 (69.3)	20.7 (69.3)	20.2 (68.4)
Average rainfall mm (inches)	222.3 (8.75)	294.4 (11.59)	331.4 (13.05)	424.7 (16.72)	441.3 (17.37)	358.5 (14.11)	282.8 (11.13)	268.0 (10.55)	252.8 (9.95)	308.2 (12.13)	354.2 (13.94)	272.5 (10.73)	3,811.1 (150.02)
Average rainy days	15	16	21	21	23	22	20	17	16	18	19	19	227
Source 1: IDEAM
Source 2: Climate-Data.org
