= Puerto Guzmán =

Coordinates: 0°58′N 76°35′W

- Municipality and town
- Flag

- Location of the municipality and town of Puerto Guzmán in the Putumayo Department of Colombia.

- Location in Colombia
- Country: Colombia
- Department: Putumayo Department

Government
- Elevation: 557 m (1,827 ft)

Population (Census 2018)
  - Total: 17,495
- Time zone: UTC-5 (Colombia Standard Time)

Puerto Guzmán is a town and municipality located in the Putumayo Department, Republic of Colombia.

== Climate ==
Puerto Guzmán has a very wet tropical rainforest climate (Köppen Af).

Climate data for Puerto Guzmán
Month	Jan	Feb	Mar	Apr	May	Jun	Jul	Aug	Sep	Oct	Nov	Dec	Year
Mean daily maximum °C (°F)	30.8 (87.4)	30.4 (86.7)	29.9 (85.8)	29.6 (85.3)	29.3 (84.7)	29.0 (84.2)	28.9 (84.0)	29.7 (85.5)	30.2 (86.4)	30.7 (87.3)	30.6 (87.1)	30.6 (87.1)	30.0 (86.0)
Daily mean °C (°F)	25.8 (78.4)	25.6 (78.1)	25.3 (77.5)	25.1 (77.2)	24.9 (76.8)	24.6 (76.3)	24.4 (75.9)	24.8 (76.6)	25.3 (77.5)	25.7 (78.3)	25.8 (78.4)	25.7 (78.3)	25.3 (77.4)
Mean daily minimum °C (°F)	20.8 (69.4)	20.8 (69.4)	20.7 (69.3)	20.6 (69.1)	20.5 (68.9)	20.3 (68.5)	20.0 (68.0)	20.0 (68.0)	20.4 (68.7)	20.7 (69.3)	21.0 (69.8)	20.9 (69.6)	20.6 (69.0)
Average rainfall mm (inches)	285.2 (11.23)	355.4 (13.99)	438.2 (17.25)	565.9 (22.28)	556.1 (21.89)	497.5 (19.59)	429.2 (16.90)	337.5 (13.29)	304.6 (11.99)	405.5 (15.96)	442.1 (17.41)	327.7 (12.90)	4,944.9 (194.68)
Average rainy days	13	13	18	19	20	20	18	15	13	15	16	14	194
Source 1:
Source 2:
