= Natural hazards in Colombia =

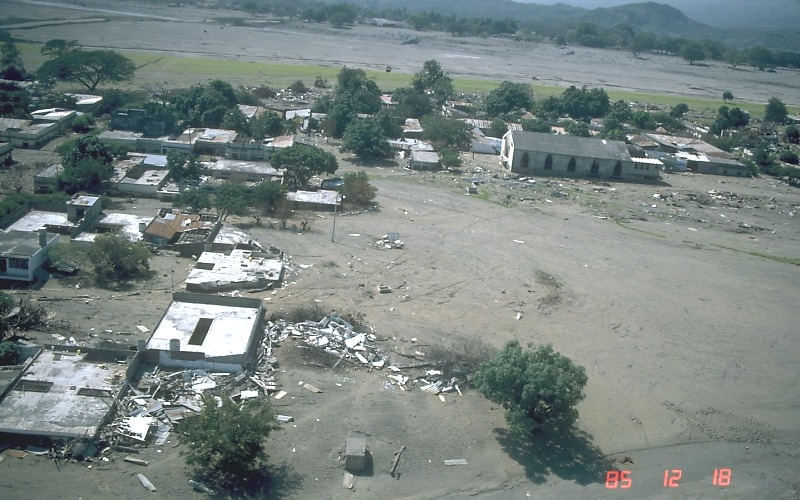
The 1985 Armero tragedy is the worst natural disaster in Colombian history

Natural disasters in Colombia are the result of several different natural hazards that affect the country according to its particular geographic and geologic features. Human vulnerability, exacerbated by the lack of planning or lack of appropriate emergency management, and the fragility of the economy and infrastructure contribute to a high rate of financial, structural, and human losses.

Some of the natural hazards present in Colombia are:

- Earthquakes
- Floods
- Landslides
- Volcanoes

== Geologic ==
Colombia is part of the Pacific Ring of Fire and Andean Volcanic Belt due to the collision of the South American Plate and the Nazca Plate. This produces an increased risk of earthquakes and volcanic eruptions. Some natural disasters of this type are:

- The 1875 Cúcuta earthquake
- The 8.2 M_{w} Tumaco earthquake shook Colombia and Ecuador with a maximum Mercalli intensity of IX (Violent), killing 300–600, and generating a large tsunami.
- The 1982 Popayán earthquake
- The 1985 eruption of Nevado del Ruiz volcano and subsequent Armero tragedy
- The 1994 Páez River earthquake
- The 1999 Armenia earthquake that affected heavily the city of Armenia, Colombia in the Quindío department.
- The 7.4 M_{w} 2026 Colombia earthquake struck western Colombia on August 10, 2026, with its epicenter near San José del Palmar, Chocó Department. The earthquake caused severe damage across western Colombia, particularly in Cali, Pereira, Quibdó, and Manizales, killing more than 200 people and damaging or destroying thousands of buildings.

== Hydrologic ==
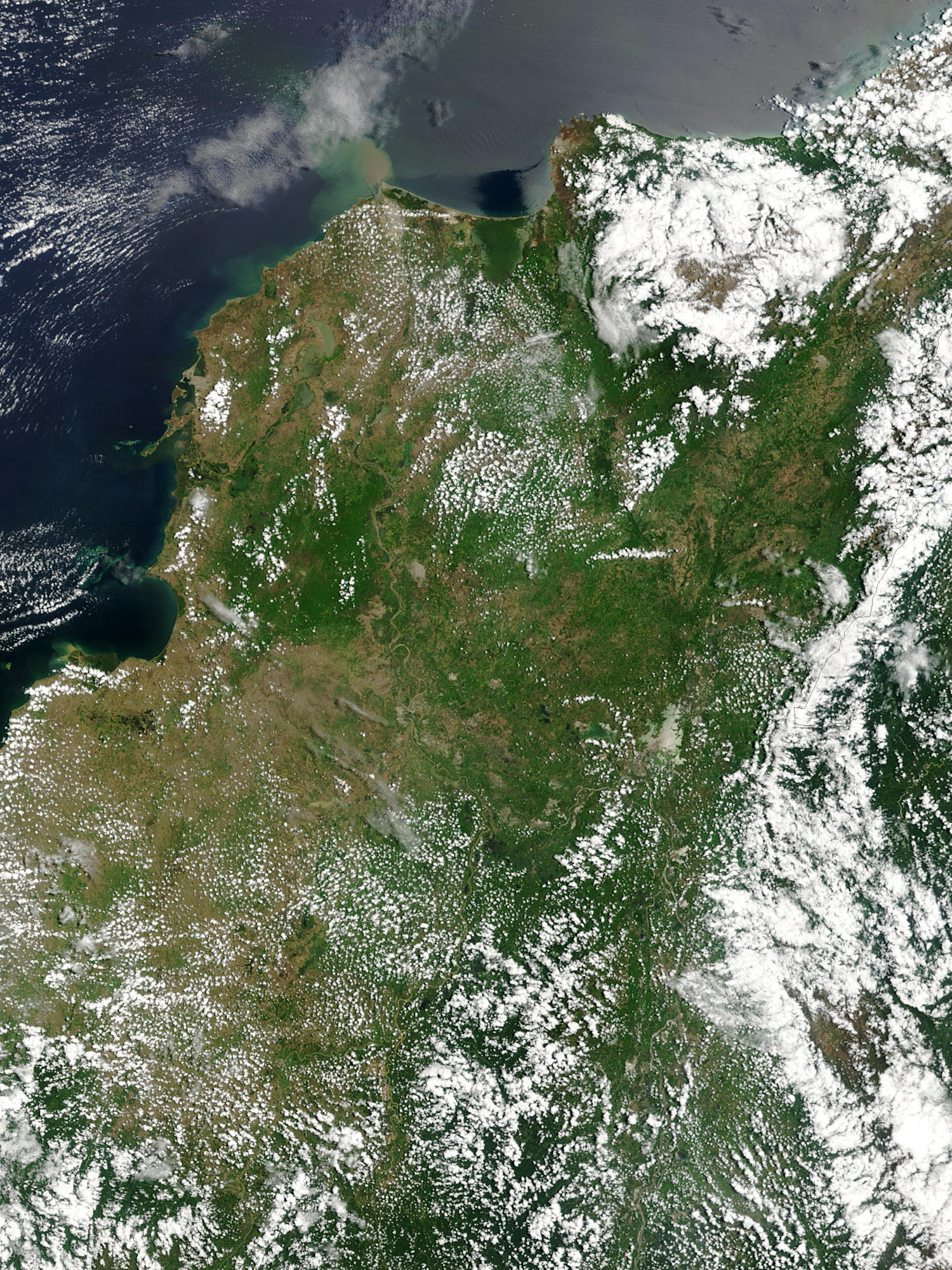
Flooding in Colombia, April 2004

Rainfall is heaviest in the Pacific lowlands and in parts of eastern Colombia, where rain is almost a daily occurrence and rain forests predominate. Precipitation exceeds 760 centimeters annually in most of the Pacific lowlands, making this one of the wettest regions in the world. The highest average annual precipitation in the world is estimated to be in Lloro, Colombia, with 13,299 mm (523.9 inches). In eastern Colombia, it decreases from 635 centimeters in portions of the Andean piedmont to 254 centimeters eastward. Extensive areas of the Caribbean interior are permanently flooded, more because of poor drainage than because of the moderately heavy precipitation during the rainy season. The Caribbean Region of Colombia, valleys of Magdalena River and Cauca River and the eastern savannahs are prone to floods during the two main monsoon seasons (April and November). The opposite phenomenon of drought is also frequent. January through March and July through September are the dry seasons, when abnormally dry periods cause shortage in the water supply to crops and urban centers.

== Climatic ==
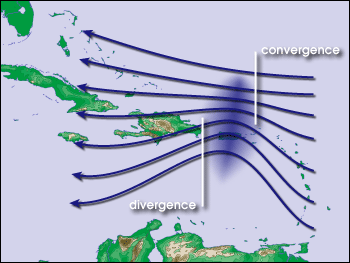
Diagram of converging and diverging winds north to the Caribbean Region of Colombia

The presence of coastal regions along the Atlantic Ocean increases the risk of hurricanes and tropical storms. Waves in the trade winds in the Atlantic — areas of converging winds that move along the same track as the prevailing wind — create instabilities in the atmosphere that may lead to the formation of hurricanes. Some of the events of this type that have affected the country are:

- Tropical Storm Bret (1993)
- Hurricane Cesar–Douglas
- Hurricane Joan–Miriam

== Health and disease ==
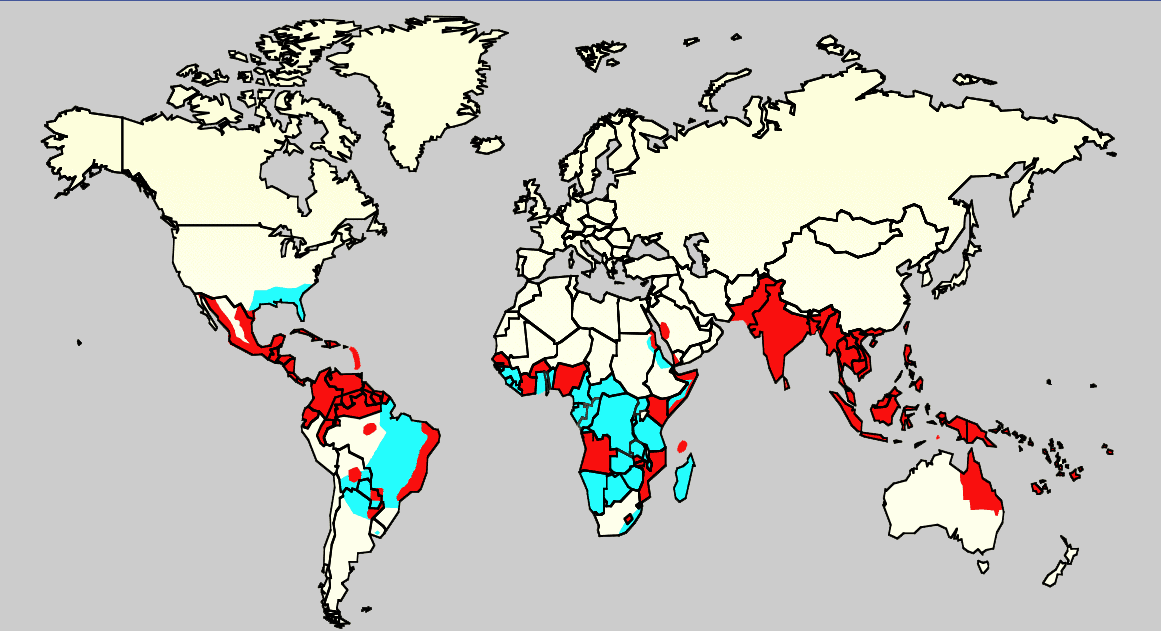
Worldwide dengue distribution, 2006. Red: Epidemic dengue fever. Blue: Aedes aegypti.

Some of the main public health issues in Colombia are: malnutrition, pregnancy-related deaths, neonatal deaths, acute respiratory disease-related deaths in children under 5 years, diarrhea-related deaths in children under 5 years, lack of vaccinations, tropical diseases such as malaria, dengue fever, hemorrhagic dengue fever, yellow fever, Chagas disease and leishmaniasis, poly-parasitism, snakebites and violence related causes of mortality.
