= Putumayo Department =

Department of Colombia

Department of Putumayo Departamento del Putumayo
- Department
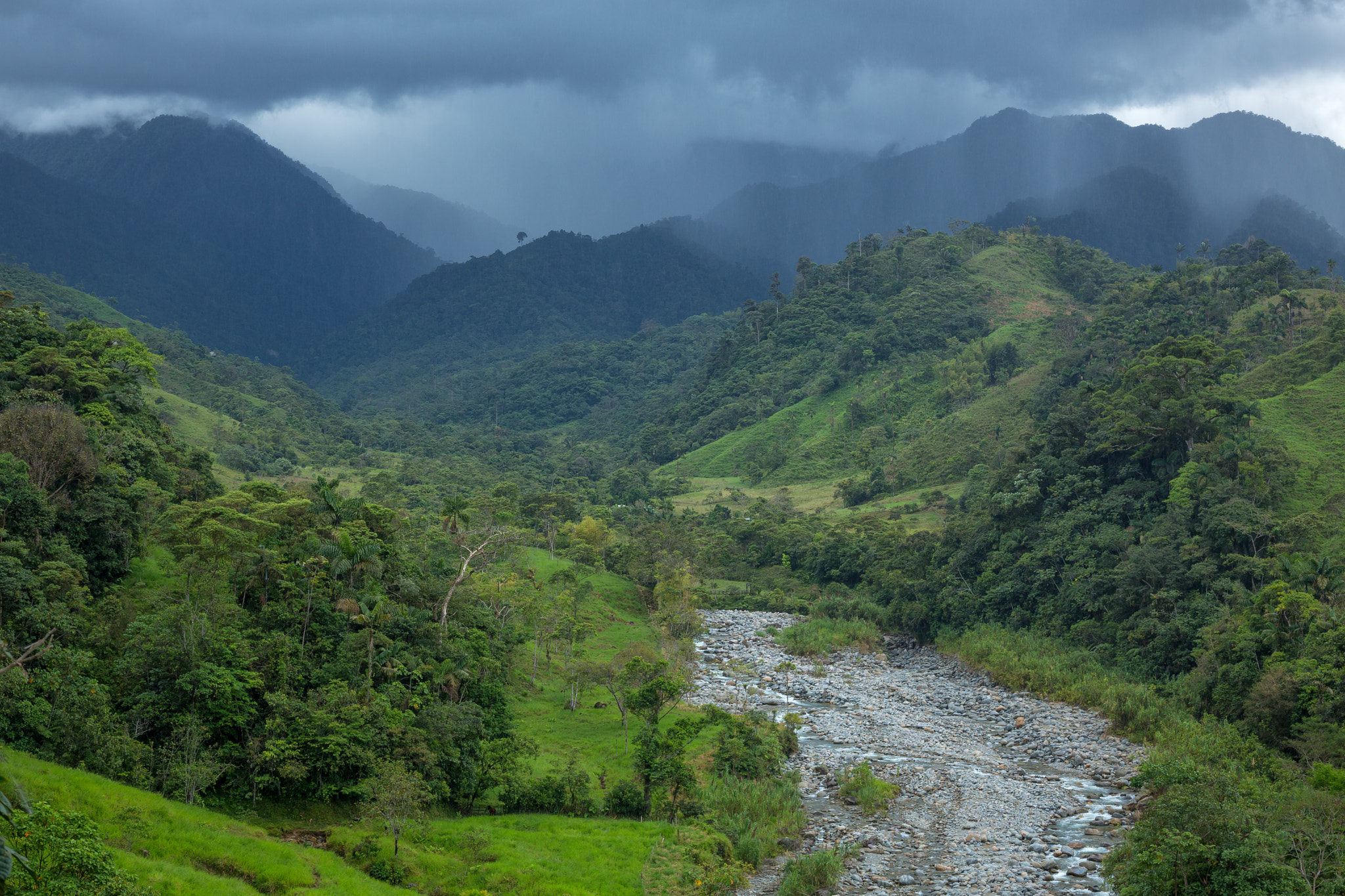
- Green Hills around Mocoa

- Flag Coat of arms

- Putumayo shown in red

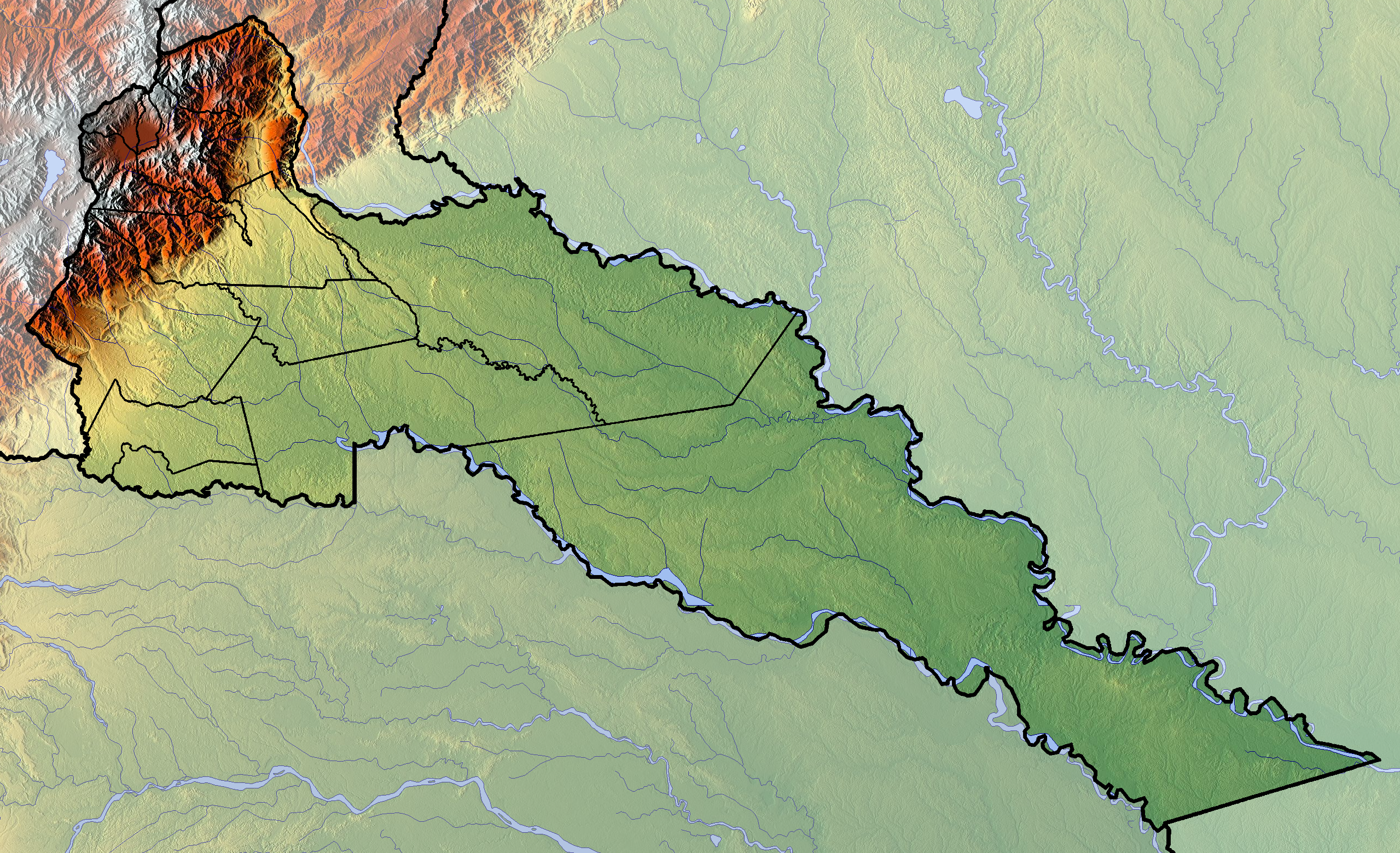
- Topography of the department
- Coordinates: 1°09′N 76°37′W
- Country: Colombia
- Region: Amazonía Region
- Established: 1991
- Capital: Mocoa
- Largest city: Puerto Asís

Government
  - Governor: Sorrel Parisa Aroca Rodriguez(2016-2019)

Area
  - Total: 24,885 km^{2} (9,608 sq mi)
  - Rank: 16th

Population (2018)
  - Total: 348,182
  - Rank: 26th
  - Density: 13.992/km^{2} (36.238/sq mi)

GDP
  - Total: COP 5,617 billion (US$ 1.3 billion)
- Time zone: UTC-05
- ISO 3166 code: CO-PUT
- Municipalities: 13
- HDI: 0.739 high · 27th of 33
- Website: www.putumayo.gov.co

Putumayo (Spanish pronunciation: [putuˈmaʝo]) is a department of Southern Colombia. It is in the south-west of the country, bordering Ecuador and Peru. Its capital is Mocoa.

The word putumayo comes from the Quechua languages. The verb p'utuy means "to spring forth" or "to burst out", and mayu means river. Thus it means "gushing river".

== History ==
Historical population
Year	Pop.	±%
1973	67,336	—
1985	174,129	+158.6%
1993	264,291	+51.8%
2005	310,132	+17.3%
2018	348,182	+12.3%

Originally, the southwestern area of the department belonged to the Cofán Indians, the northwestern to the Kamentxá Indians, the central and southern areas to tribes that spoke Tukano languages (such as the Siona), and the eastern to tribes that spoke Witoto languages. Part of the Kamentxá territory was conquered by the Inca Huayna Cápac in 1492, who, after crossing the Cofán territory, established a Quechua population on the valley of Sibundoy, known today as Ingas. After the Inca defeat in 1533, the region was invaded by the Spanish in 1542, and from 1547 was administered by Catholic missions.

The current territory of Putumayo was linked to Popayan during the Spanish Colonial Period and in the first Republican decades belonged to the "Azuay Department", which included territories in Ecuador and Perú. Later a long process of territorial redistributions began:

- 1831: Popayán Province.
- 1857: Estado Federal del Cauca.
- 1886: Cauca Department.
- 1905: Intendencia del Putumayo.
- 1909: Intendencia del Caquetá.
- 1912: Comisaría Especial del Putumayo.
- 1953: Department of Nariño.
- 1957: Comisaría Especial del Putumayo.
- 1968: Intendencia Especial del Putumayo.
- 1991: Putumayo Department.

== Municipalities ==
Municipalities of the Putumayo Department

1. Colón
2. Mocoa
3. Orito
4. Puerto Asís
5. Puerto Caicedo
6. Puerto Guzmán
7. Puerto Leguízamo
8. San Francisco
9. San Miguel
10. Santiago
11. Sibundoy
12. Valle del Guamez
13. Villagarzón

== Flag ==
The flag of the Department of Putumayo is a rectangle with horizontal tricolored stripes. The green stripe symbolizes the jungles that almost entirely cover the department. The white stripe symbolizes the peaceful character of the people of Putumayo. The black stripe symbolizes oil, the Department's main economic resource.

The flag is similar to the flag of the Spanish region of Extremadura, the flag of Oostburg and some of the historical flags of Afghanistan.

== Gallery ==
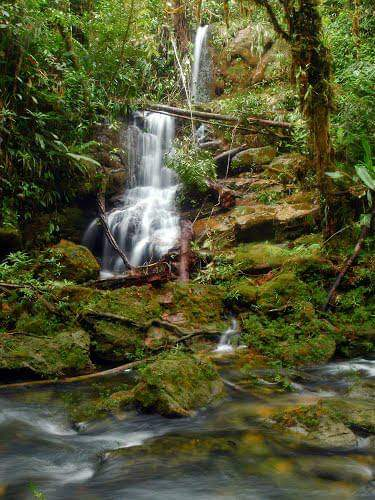
The Cascadas Fin del Mundo in Mocoa, Putumayo (2019)

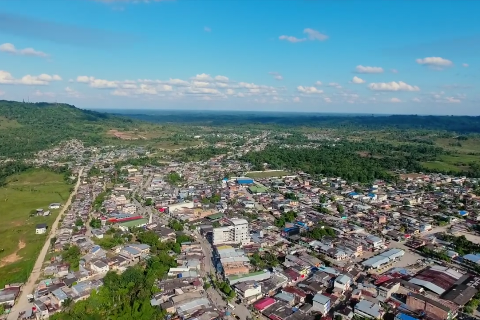
Aerial view of Orito, Putumayo (2020)

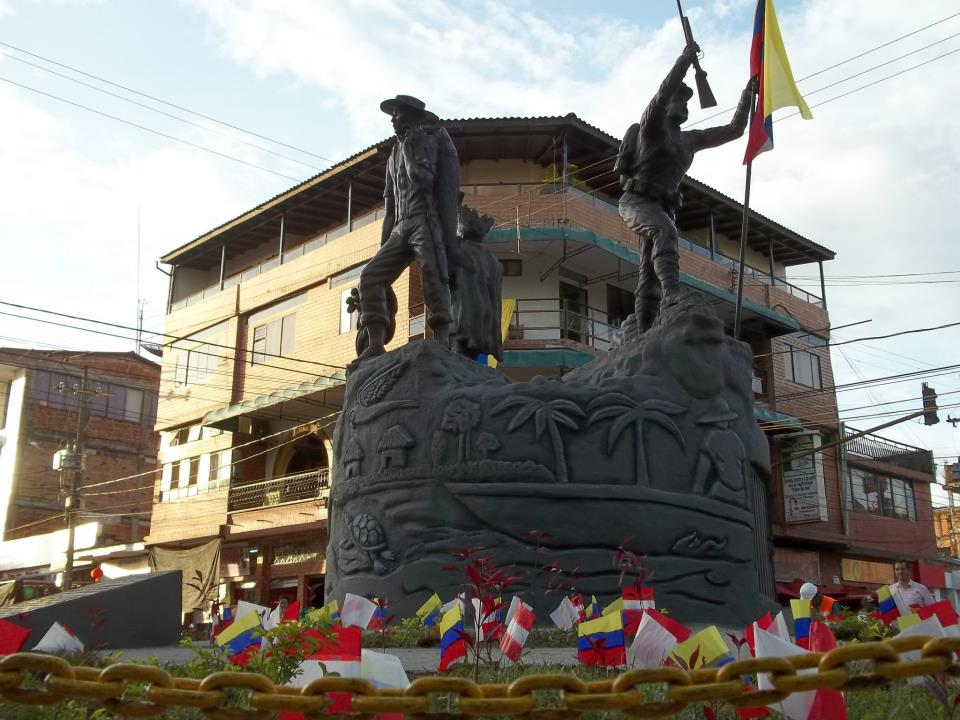
The Monumento al Centenario in Puerto Asís, Putumayo (2014)

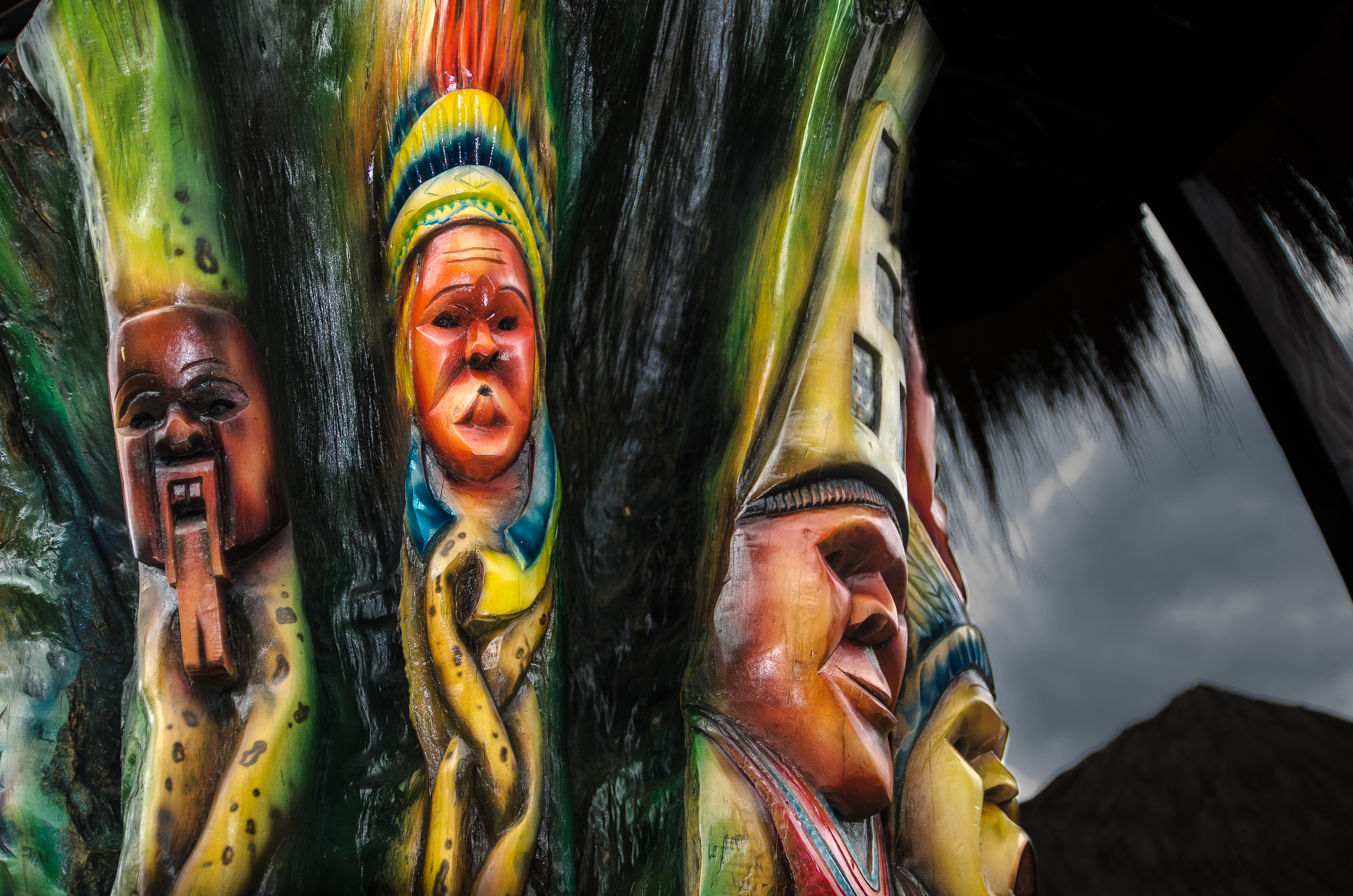
Colorful decorative wood carvings in Sibundoy Park in Sibundoy, Putumayo (2014)

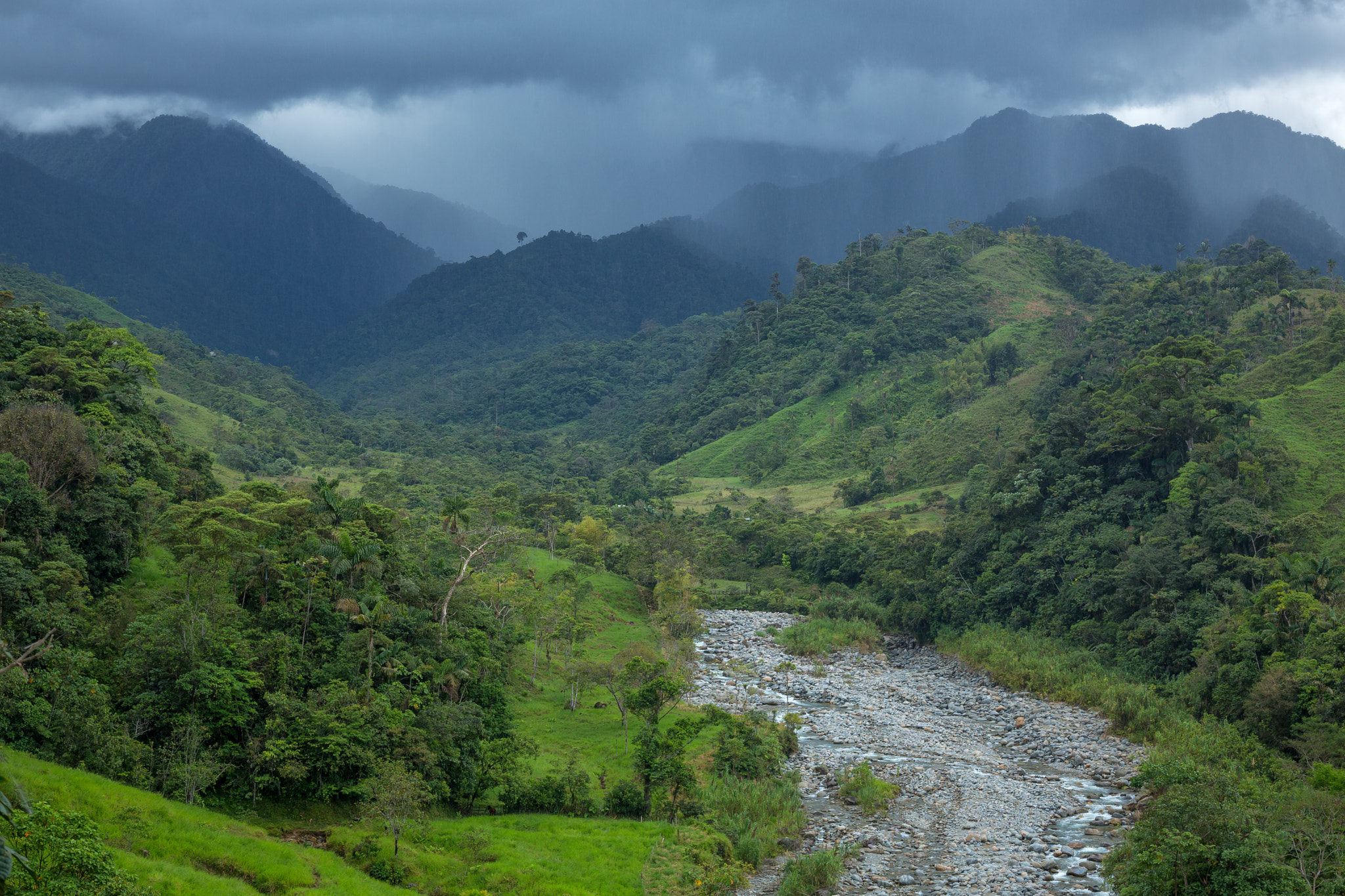
Hills in Mocoa, Putumayo (2017)

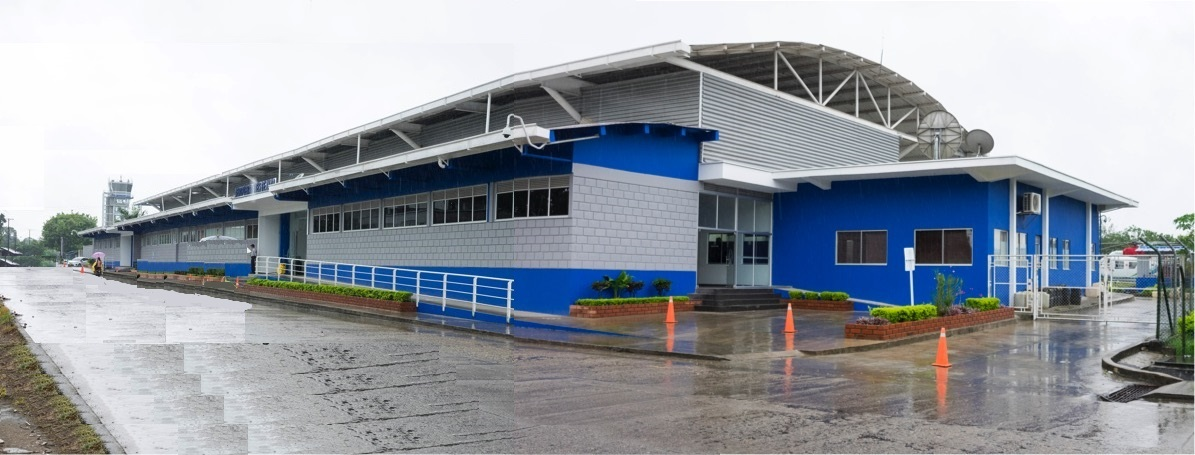
Tres de Mayo Airport in Puerto Asís, Putumayo (2019)

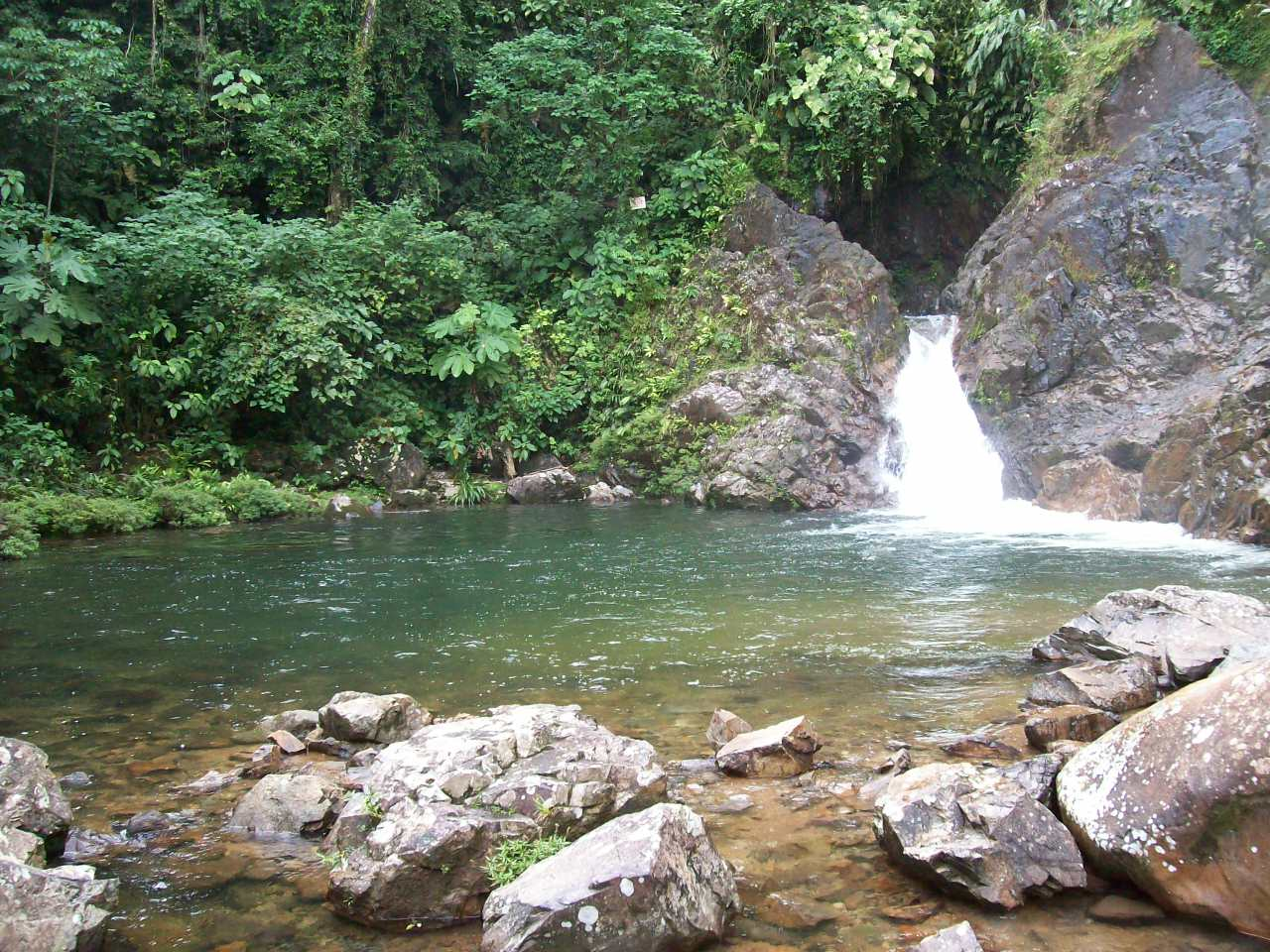
A waterfall in Villagarzón, Putumayo (2009)

== See also ==
- Santuario Orito Indí-Andé Fauna and Flora Sanctuary
- Putumayo River
