= Gold City (disambiguation) =

Gold City is an American southern gospel quartet.

Gold City may also refer to:

- Gold City, Kentucky, a community
- Gold City (horse) (1984–1990), a racehorse

== See also ==
- City of Gold (disambiguation)
- Golden City (disambiguation)
