= Seal of Pereira =

The seal of Pereira, capital city of the Colombian department of Risaralda.

== Meaning ==
The shield symbolizes the two terms that form the pre-colonial times and the current city. The golden frog symbolizes the Quimbaya culture, which was the sacred animal of the culture, representing fertility and agility. The sun and the two half crowns Counts were taken in part from the old shield of ancient Carthage, which was awarded to "Robledo City" by the Emperor Charles V.
