= City of neighbourhoods =

City of neighbourhoods or City of neighborhoods is a commonly applied nickname for many cities, and may refer to:

== Places ==
- Albany, New York, United States
- Atlanta, Georgia, United States, see Nicknames of Atlanta
- Baltimore, Maryland, United States
- Boston, Massachusetts, United States, see Nicknames of Boston
- Chicago, Illinois, United States, see Community areas in Chicago
- Philadelphia, Pennsylvania, United States, see Nicknames of Philadelphia
- Portland, Oregon, United States, see Nicknames of Portland, Oregon
- San Francisco, California, United States, see Nicknames of San Francisco
- Toronto, Ontario, Canada; see History of neighbourhoods in Toronto
- Vancouver, British Columbia, Canada, see Nicknames of Vancouver

== Other uses ==
- City of Neighbourhoods, a 2004 album by Neufeld-Occhipinti Jazz Orchestra and a song on the album
- This City of Neighborhoods, a 2008 album by The Seldon Plan
