= Seven Cities of Gold (disambiguation) =

Seven Cities of Gold refers to seven cities in Spanish mythology.

It may also refer to:

- Seven Cities of Gold (film), a 1955 historical adventure film starring Richard Egan
- The Seven Cities of Gold (video game), a 1984 adventure game
- Seven Cities of Gold (book), a 2010 book by David Moles
- "Seven Cities of Gold", a track on the 2012 Rush album Clockwork Angels

== See also ==
- City of Gold (disambiguation)
- Seven Cities (disambiguation)
