= Golden City =

Golden City may refer to:

== Places ==
- Golden, Colorado, originally named Golden City
- Golden City, Missouri, a city in Golden City Township, Barton County, Missouri, United States
- Golden City Township, Barton County, Missouri, a township in Barton County, Missouri, United States

=== Colloquial names ===
- Cities in Victoria, Australia, nicknamed "Golden City" due to their gold production during the Victorian Gold rush
  - Ballarat
  - Bendigo
- Chrysopolis or Golden City, former name of Üsküdar, Istanbul
- Jaisalmer, Rajasthan, India
- Koduvally, Kerala, India
- Kolar, "The Golden city of India", Karnataka, India, because of Kolar Gold Fields
- Prague, the capital of Czech Republic, commonly referred to as Zlatá Praha (Golden Prague)
- Golden City, a nickname for San Francisco
- Sonipat, a city in Haryana, India, known as Swarnprastha (Golden City) in ancient times
- Berekum, a city in Ghana sometimes referred to as "The Golden City"

== Other ==
- The Golden City (novel), the third in Fourth Realm Trilogy of dystopian novels by John Twelve Hawks
- The Golden City, a book on architecture by Henry Hope Reed, Jr.
- Golden City 1 station, Biñan City, Laguna, Philippines
- Die goldene Stadt, a German film 1941
- The Golden City, a city of the Lego Exo-Force toy line

== See also ==
- City of Gold (disambiguation)
- Gold City, a gospel group
