= Seven Cities =

Seven Cities may refer to:

- "Seven Cities" (song), a 1999 single by trance producers Solarstone
- Seven Cities (Malazan), a continent in the Malazan Book of the Fallen series
- Seven Cities of Gold (disambiguation)
- Seven cities of Delhi
- The mythical "Isle of Seven Cities", also known as Antillia
- The Seven Cities of Hampton Roads, the largest communities in southeastern Virginia
- Destruction of the Seven Cities (1598-1604) in Chile.
- Yeti Shahr (seven cities), an alternate name for Altishahr (six cities), an ancient name for the Tarim Basin.
- Portuguese for Sete Cidades, a National Park in Brazil
- Siebenbürgen ("Seven cities") is the German name for Transylvania

== See also ==
- Seven hills (disambiguation)
