= City of Gold =

City of Gold or Cities of Gold may refer to:

== Mythological places ==
- City of the Caesars, mythical South American city of great wealth
- El Dorado, mythical city of gold in South America
- La Canela, legendary location in South America said to contain large amounts of gold and spices
- Lanka, the capital city of Ravana in the epic Ramayana
- Paititi, legendary Inca lost city of gold, silver and jewels said to lie east of the Andes in the rain forest
- Quivira, one of the mythical "Seven Cities of Gold"

== Arts and entertainment ==
=== Books ===
- Cities of Gold: A Journey Across the American Southwest in Pursuit of Coronado by Douglas Preston
- City of Gold (book), a collection of Old Testament stories retold for children by Peter Dickinson
- City of Gold (Deighton), a spy thriller by Len Deighton
- City of Gold: A biography of Bombay by Gillian Tindall
- The City of Gold and Lead, a novel in the Tripods series by John Christopher

=== Film and television ===
- City of Gold (1957 film), a film about the town of Dawson City, Yukon
- City of Gold (2010 film), a Hindi film
- City of Gold (2015 film), a documentary film about Los Angeles Times food critic Jonathan Gold

=== Music ===
==== Albums ====
- Cities of Gold (album), a 2009 album by Lost Valentinos
- City of Gold (Fady Maalouf album) (2012)
- City of Gold (Molly Tuttle album) (2023)
- City of Gold (Pearls Before Swine album) (1971)

==== Songs ====
- "City of Gold", a song by DragonForce from Maximum Overload
- "City of Gold", a song by HṚṢṬA from L'éclat du ciel était insoutenable
- "City of Gold", a composition by Tony Banks (musician)
- "City of Gold", a song by K-391 & Diviners (ft. Anna Yvette)

=== Plays ===
- City of Gold, a 2019 play by Australian actor and playwright Meyne Wyatt

== See also ==
- Gold Museum, Bogotá
- Golden City (disambiguation)
- Johannesburg, South Africa, nicknamed "The City of Gold"
- Lost city (disambiguation)
- The Mysterious Cities of Gold, Japanese-French animated series
