= Lost Village =

Lost Village(s) or The Lost Village may refer to:

== Places ==
- Abandoned villages
- Deserted medieval villages
- Lost Villages, a group of ten villages in Ontario, Canada

== Entertainment ==
- Lost Village Festival, a festival in Norton Disney, Lincolnshire, England, UK
- The Lost Village (film), a 1947 French drama film
- The Lost Village (TV series) (Japanese: 迷家-マヨイガ, romanized: Mayoiga), a 2017 Japanese anime
- The Lost Village (video game) (Chinese: 山门与幻境; pinyin: Shānmén yǔ Huànjìng; lit. 'Mountain Gate and Fantasy'), a 2024 Chinese video game
- Smurfs: The Lost Village, a 2017 3D animated U.S. children's film

== See also ==
- A Village Lost and Found (2009 book) stereoscopic photo book of vintage photos
- Lost Bridge Village, Arkansas, USA
- The Village (disambiguation)
- Lost (disambiguation)
- Lost city (disambiguation)
- Category:Lost populated places
