= Lost City =

A lost city is an urban settlement that fell into terminal decline and whose significance was forgotten.

Lost City, The Lost City, or Lost Cities may also refer to:

== Places ==
- Ciudad Perdida, a lost city on the Caribbean coast of Colombia
- Lost City, California, in Calaveras County
- Lost City, Oklahoma, USA, the landing site of the Lost City Meteorite
- Lost City, West Virginia, USA, named for the nearby Lost River
- Pueblo Grande de Nevada also known as "Nevada's Lost City", a complex of villages, located near Overton, Nevada, USA
- The Palace of the Lost City, a luxury holiday resort near the Sun City casino and resort in the North West Province of South Africa
- Lost City (hydrothermal field), Atlantis Massif, Mid-Atlantic Ridge; a field of hydrothermal vents in the Atlantic Ocean

== Arts, media and entertainment ==
=== Films ===
- The Lost City (1920 serial), a film serial directed by E.A. Martin and starring Juanita Hansen
- The Lost City (1935 serial), two science fiction films directed by Harry Revier and starring Kane Richmond
- The Lost City (1950 film), a Mexican drama film
- The Lost City (1955 film), an Italian-Spanish drama film
- The Lost City (1997), a feature-length compilation of the South African TV series, The Legend of the Hidden City
- The Lost City (2005 film), a film about the owner of a Havana nightclub in 1958 directed by Andy Garcia
- The Lost City (2022 film), a romantic comedy adventure film

=== Games ===
- Lost Cities (video game), an Xbox 360 game planned for release in 2008 and based on the card game
- Lost Cities, a card game published by both Kosmos and Rio Grande Games
- The Lost City (Dungeons & Dragons), a 1982 adventure module for the Dungeons & Dragons fantasy role-playing game
- The Lost City (video game), a 2012 iOS point-and-click adventure game

=== Other media uses ===
- "Lost City" (Stargate SG-1), a two-part episode of the television series Stargate SG-1
- Lost City (novel), a 2004 novel by Clive Cussler
- The Lost Cities: A Drift House Voyage, a children's novel by Dale Peck
- "The Lost City", an episode from Ben & Holly's Little Kingdom
- "The Lost City", an episode from Dora the Explorer

== See also ==
- Atlantis (disambiguation)
  - Atlantis, a legendary lost city
- Lost villages (disambiguation)
- Category:Lost populated places
