= Poporo =

Tool specifically made to assist in the chewing of coca leaves

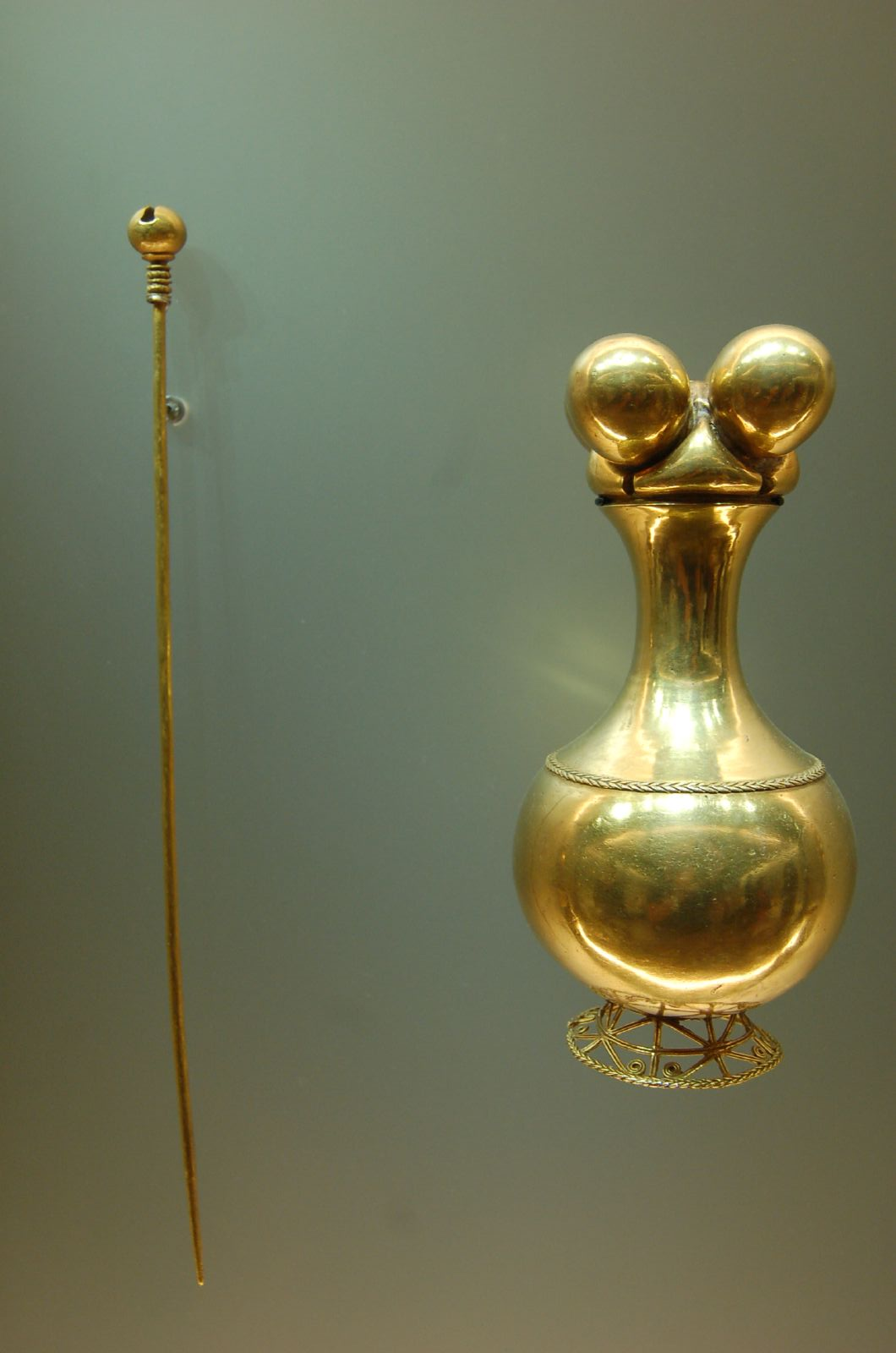
The Quimbaya Poporo, gold, attributed to the pre-Columbian Quimbaya civilization in the Andean region of present-day Colombia, ca. 300 CE

A Poporo is a device used by indigenous cultures in present and pre-Columbian South America for storage of small amounts of lime produced from burnt and crushed sea-shells. It consists of two pieces: the receptacle and the lid, which includes a pin that is used to carry the lime to the mouth while a person is chewing coca leaves. Since the chewing of coca is sacred for the indigenous people, the poporos are also believed to have mystical powers and social status.

In Colombia, poporos are found in archaeological remains from the Chibcha, Muisca, and Quimbaya cultures among others. The materials used in the early periods are mainly pottery and carved stone. In classic periods gold and tumbaga are the most frequent: an example of this is the Poporo Quimbaya, which is a national symbol and is exhibited in the Gold Museum. In the early 21st century, the indigenous people of Sierra Nevada de Santa Marta still use poporos in the traditional way of more than one thousand years ago. They are made with the dried fruits of a plant of genus cucurbita (totumo).

== Poporo Quimbaya ==
One particularly famous poporo, the Poporo Quimbaya, is a pre-Columbian artpiece of the classic quimbaya period, currently exhibited in the Gold Museum in Bogotá, Colombia. Its primary use was as a ceremonial device for chewing of coca leaves during religious ceremonies. It was made around 300 CE with a lost-wax casting process.

It is believed the artpiece was found at, and stolen from a burial chamber during the first half of the 19th century, at a place named Loma de Pajarito located between the current Yarumal, Angostura, and Campamento municipalities, northeast Antioquia, during a time when grave robbing at pre-Columbian indigenous tombs (locally deemed as guaquería) was still very common.

In 1939 the Banco de la República, the central bank of Colombia, purchased the Poporo Quimbaya, in an effort to preserve it from destruction. This began a larger project of preservation of pre-Columbian goldwork that led to the creation of the Gold Museum in Bogotá.

The Poporo Quimbaya is an unusual piece, made of tumbaga, with oddly minimalistic lines, that give it a modern look. It is one of the most recognized pre-Columbian artpieces, being often used as a symbol of the indigenous pre-Columbian culture. It has been depicted in the Colombian currency, in coins and bills. A reproduction served as the winner's trophy for the 2019 and 2020 editions of the Tour Colombia cycling race.

== A poporo made of copper alloy with details ==
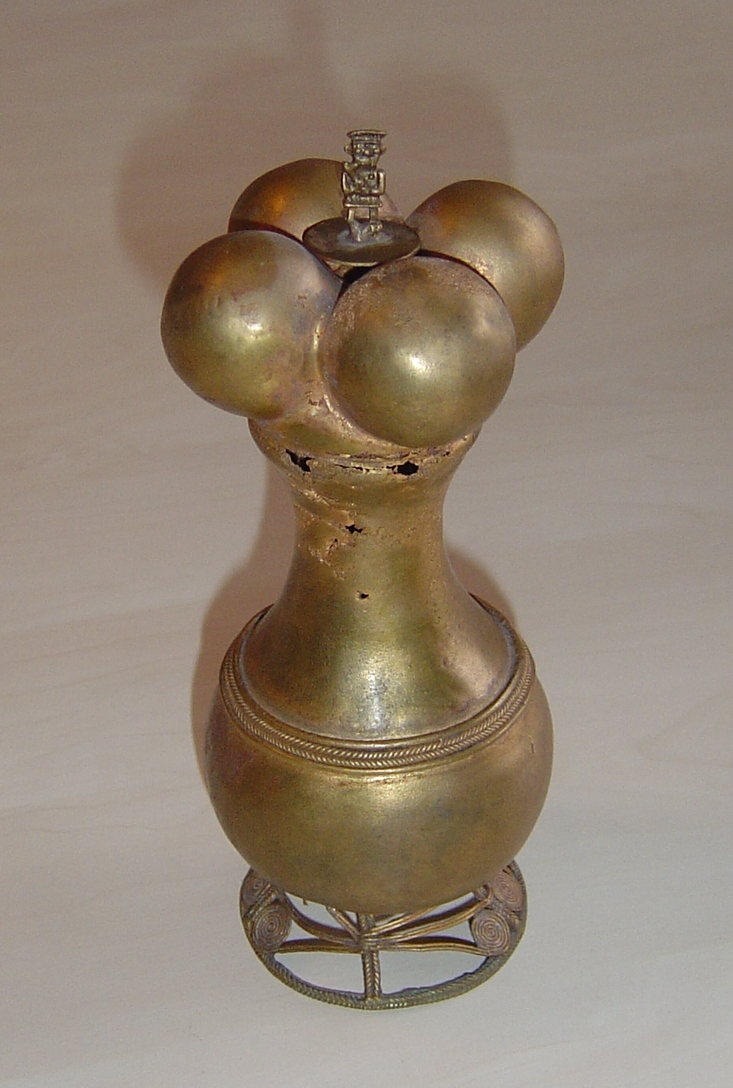
Full view

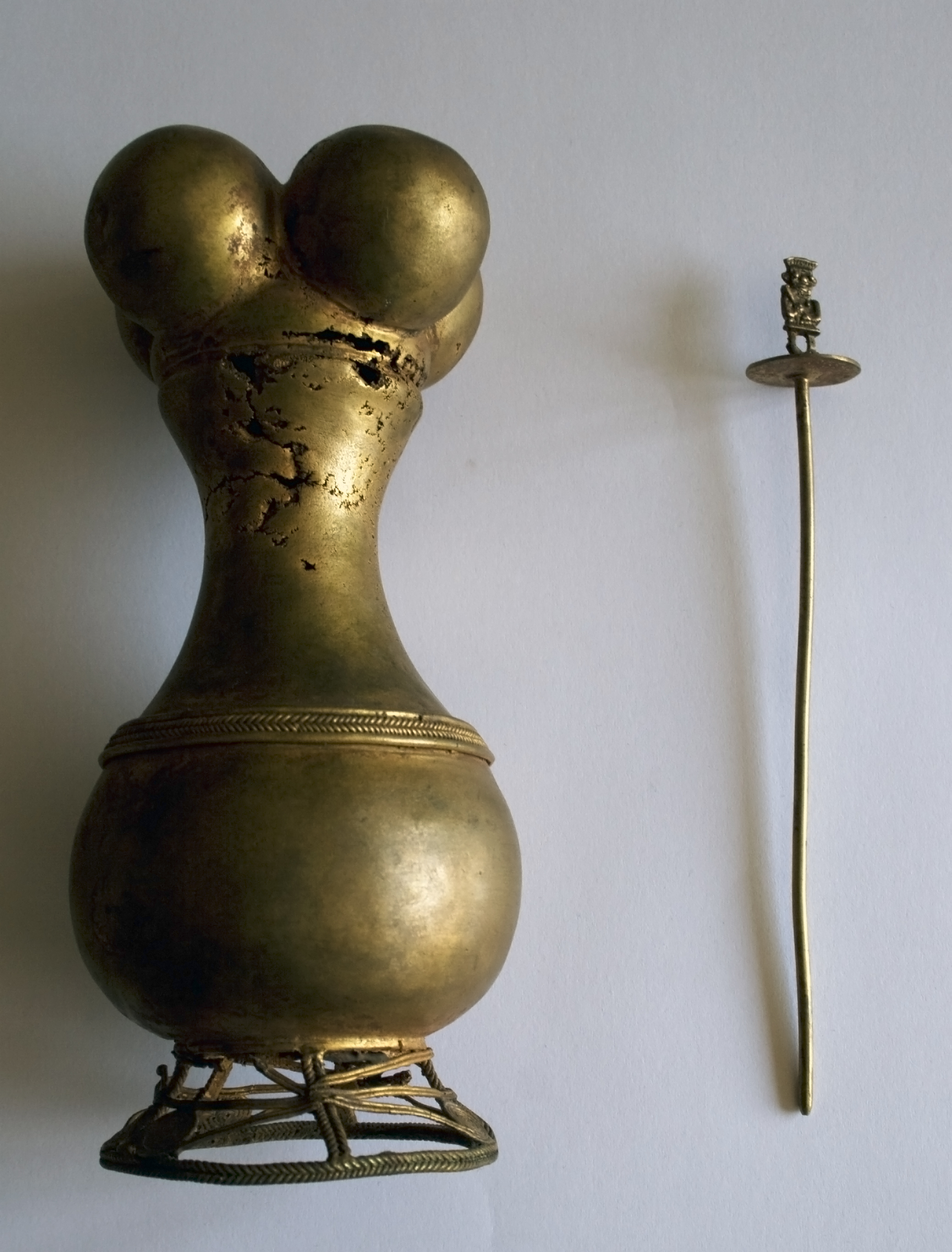
With the pin outside

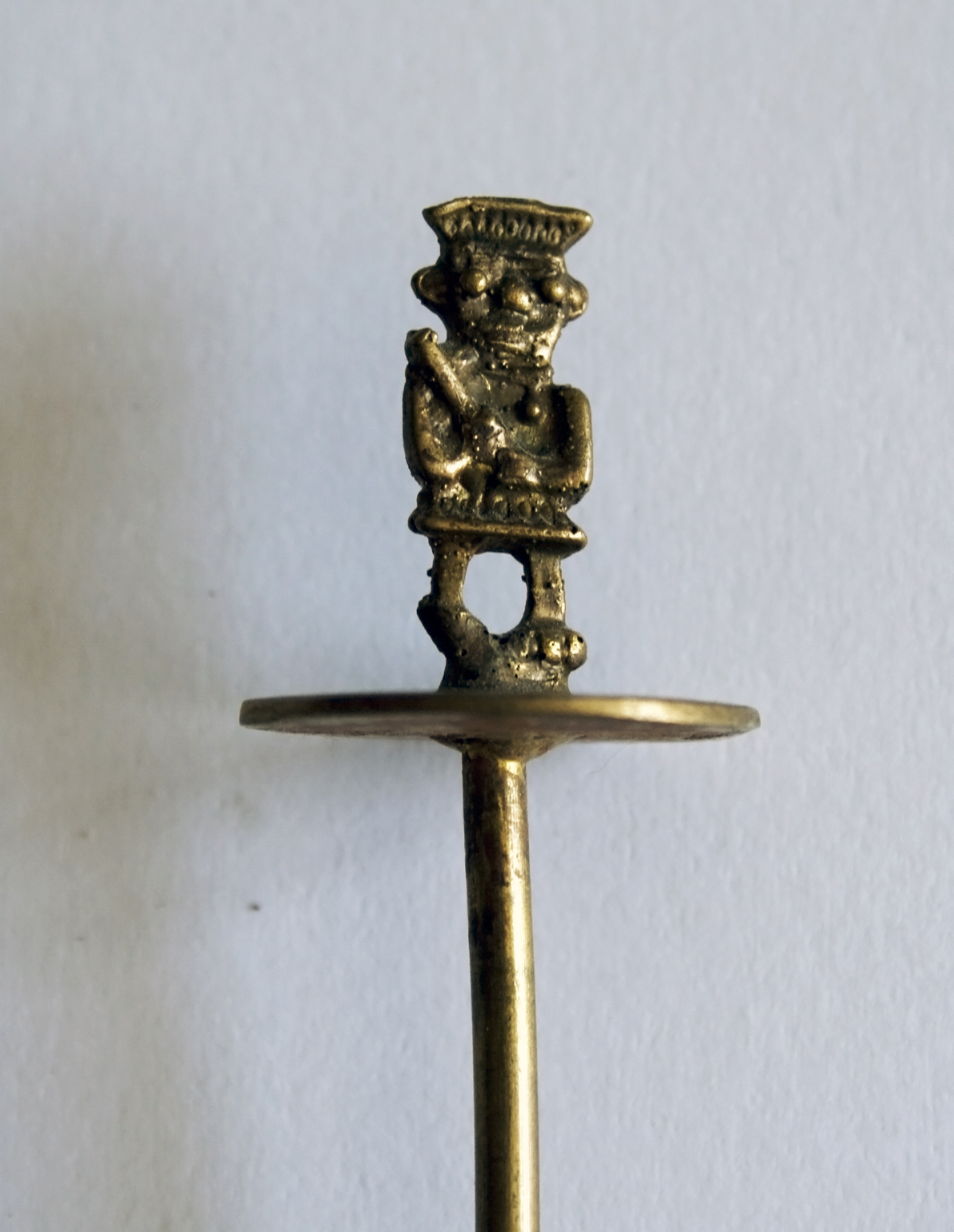
Head of the pin

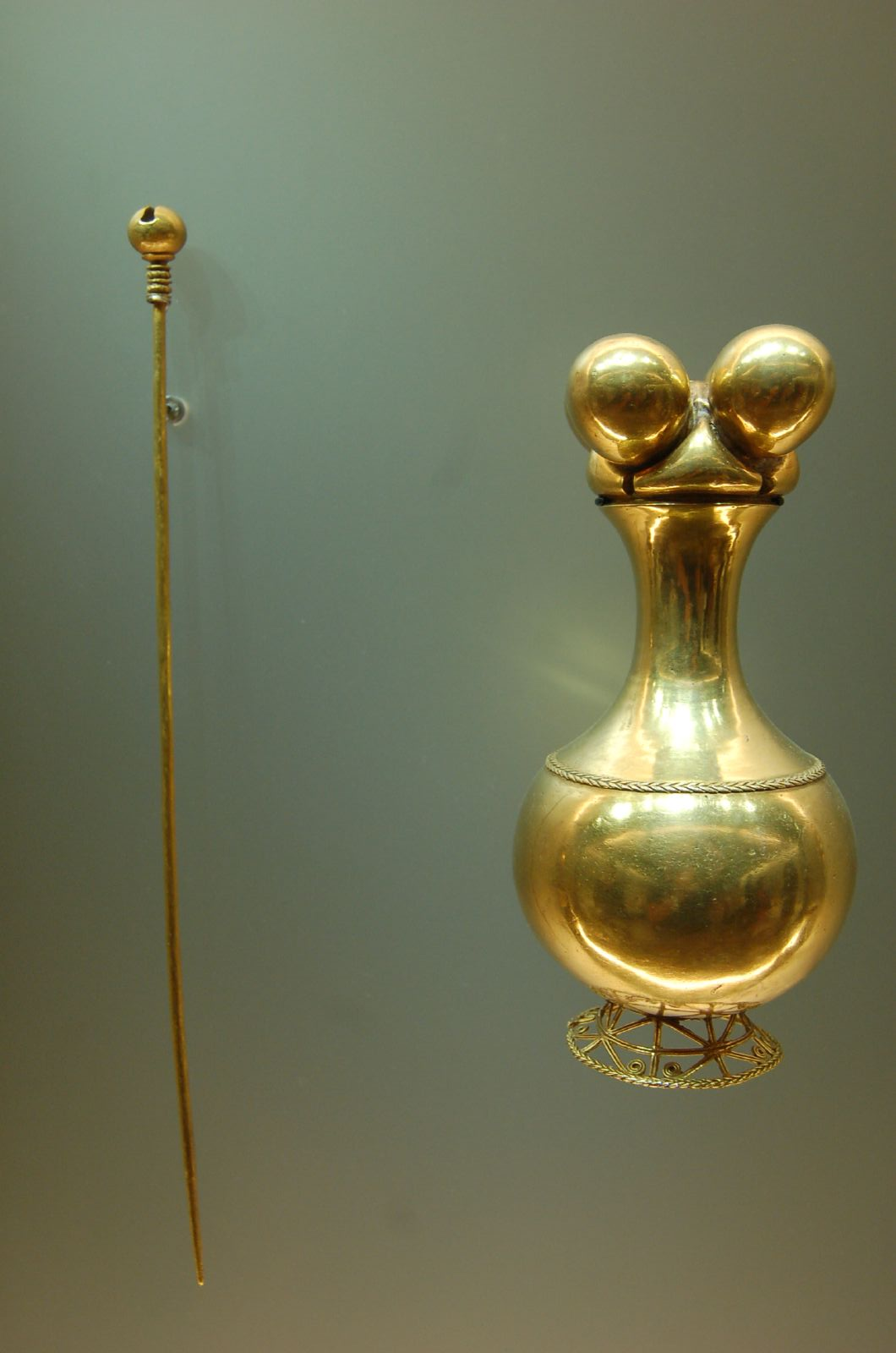
Poporo Quimbaya and pestle
