= Gold Museum, Bogotá =

Museum in Bogota, Colombia

Museo del Oro
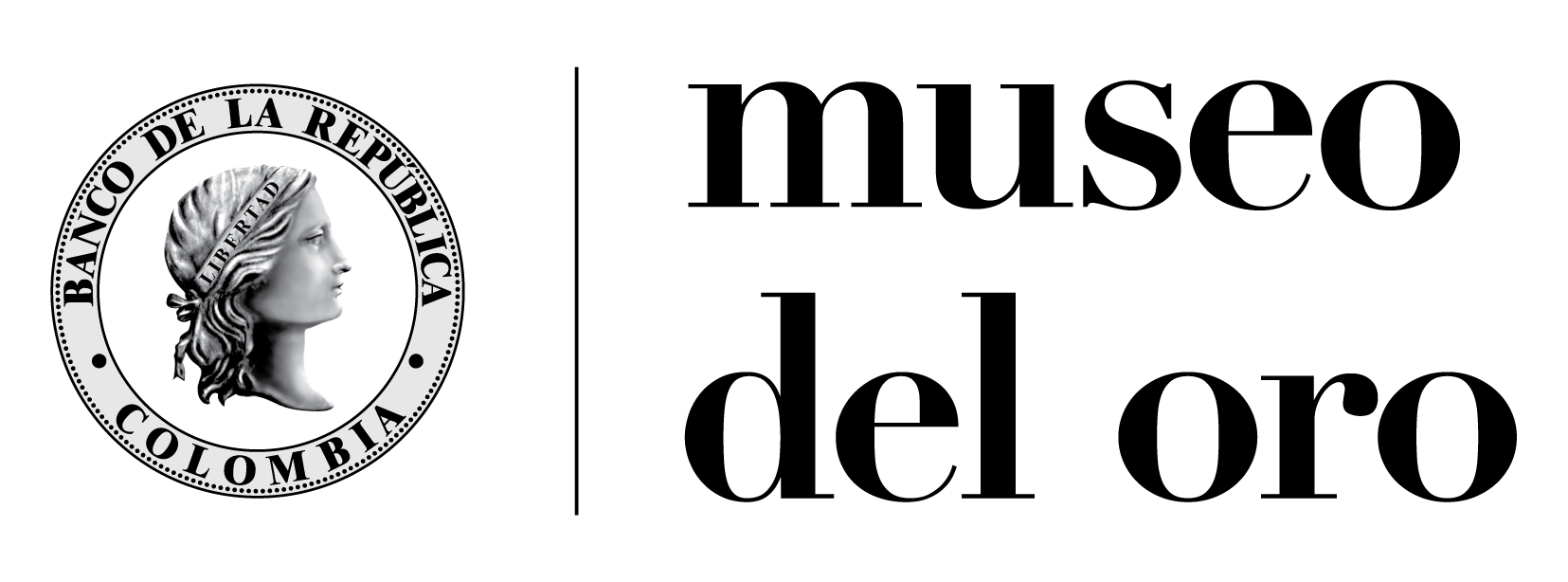

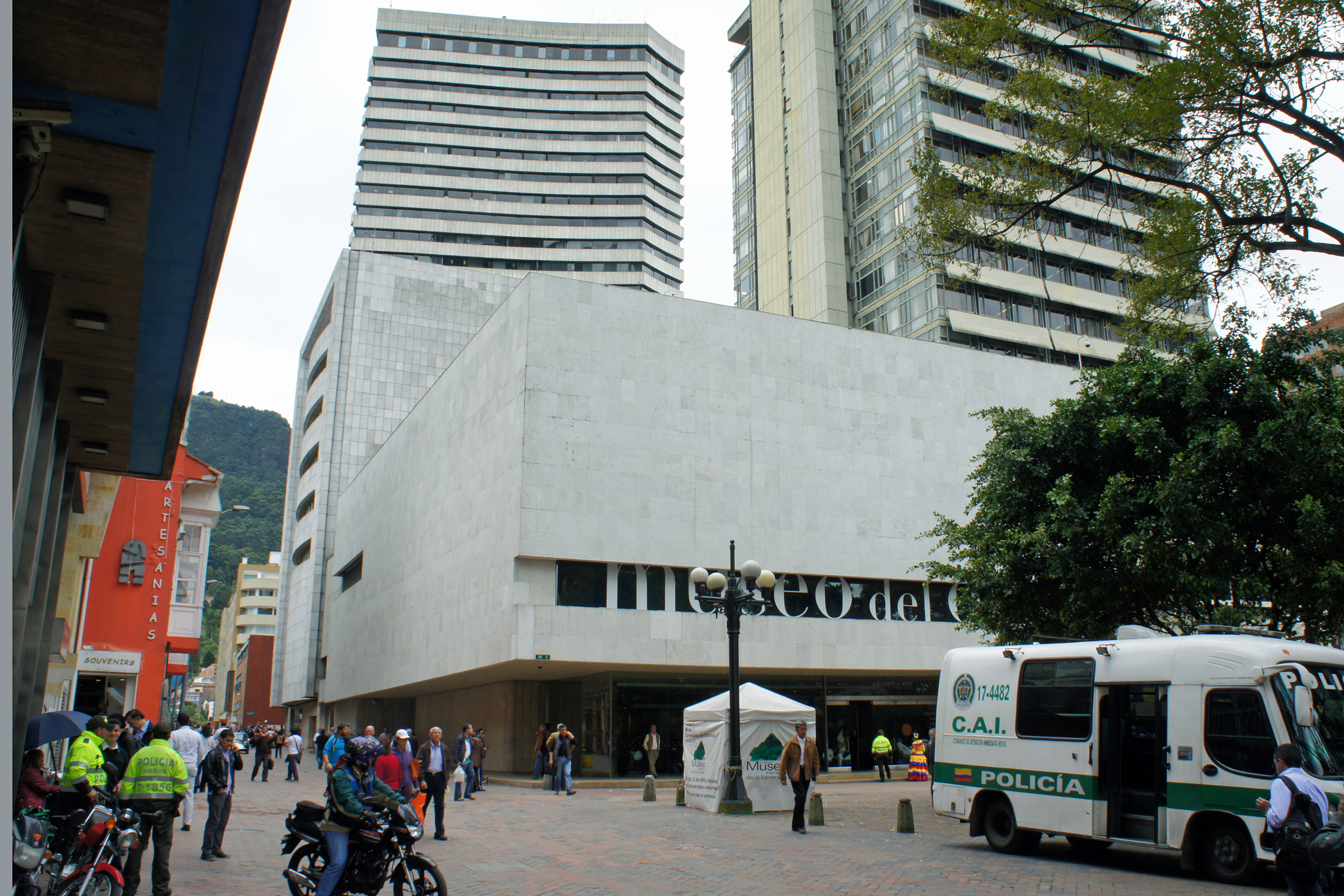
- View of the Museum of Gold
- Interactive fullscreen map
- Established: 22 December 1939
- Location: Carrera 6 # 15-82 (Parque Santander); Bogotá, Colombia
- Coordinates: 4°36′07″N 74°04′19″W
- Director: María Alicia Uribe Villegas
- Public transit access: Museo del Oro
- Website: www.banrepcultural.org/gold-museum

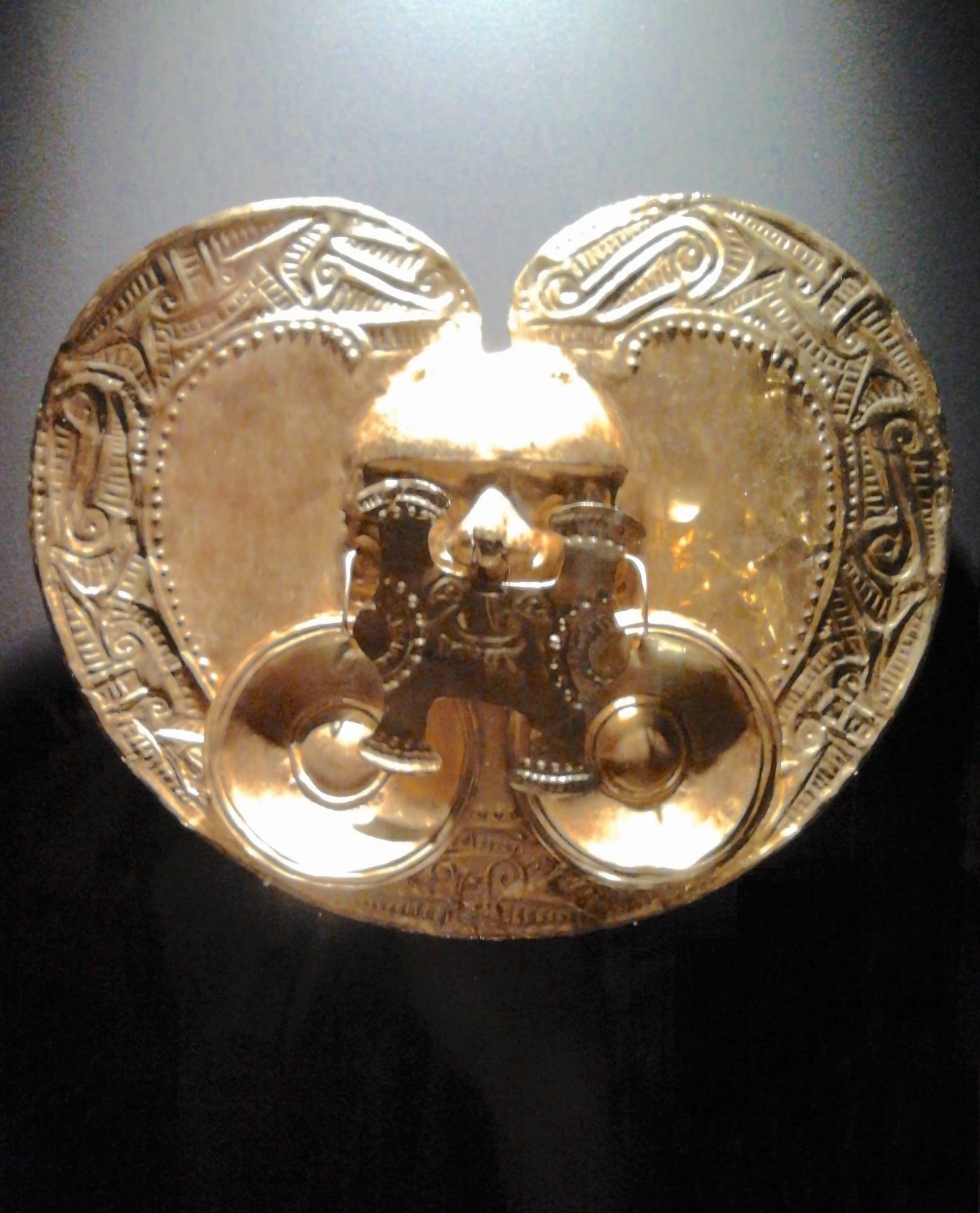
Calima culture heart-shaped pectoral as displayed in the temporary exhibition of Museum of Gold's exhibits at the Royal Castle in Warsaw

Logo of the museum with the seal of the Banco de la República, next to the museum

The Museum of Gold (Spanish: Museo del Oro) is an archaeology museum located in Bogotá, Colombia. It is one of the most visited tourist highlights in the country. The museum receives around 500,000 tourists per year.

The museum displays a selection of pre-Columbian gold and other metal alloys, such as Tumbaga, and contains the largest collection of gold artifacts in the world in its exhibition rooms on the second and third floors. Together with pottery, stone, shell, wood and textile objects, these items, made of what indigenous cultures considered to be a sacred metal, testify to the life and thought of the different societies which lived in present-day Colombia before the Spanish conquest of the Americas. Many indigenous groups did not consider gold to be a source of wealth, but rather held the belief it was charged with symbolic and religious values. The Spaniards, for example, reported the Inca royal family claimed to be descendants of the sun and the moon, and that gold was the "sweat of the sun" and silver the "tears of the moon."

== History ==
In 1934, the Bank of the Republic began helping to protect the archaeological patrimony of Colombia. The object known as Poporo Quimbaya was the first one in a collection. It has been on exhibition for 70 years. The museum is today administered by Banrepcultural.

The museum houses the famous Muisca golden raft found in Pasca in 1969, that represents the ceremony of the new zipa (ruler) of Muyquytá, the basis for the El Dorado myth. The heir to the chieftaincy assumed power with a great offering to the gods. In this representation he is seen standing at the centre of a raft, surrounded by the principal chieftains, all of them adorned with gold and feathers.

After a decade of work, the museum was expanded and renovated in October 2008. With the renovation, the museum organized the permanent exhibition in five rooms with archaeological objects and an interactive room. It also added an auditorium, some temporary exhibition rooms, a cafe, a restaurant, and a souvenir store.

There are other locations of the Museo del Oro throughout Colombia, including in Calima, Quimbaya, Santa Marta, and Cartagena.

== Description ==
The museum has a collection of 55,000 pieces, 6,000 of which are on display in their expanded building. There are bilingual descriptions of almost all exhibits. On the first floor houses the museum's main entrance, a shop, and a restaurant.

Exhibitions begin on the second floor. The main room is called "People and Gold in pre-Hispanic Colombia". In glass vitrines display goldsmiths' work from the different cultures which inhabited Colombia before the Spanish colonists arrived. The permanent exhibition is divided into different halls for every culture: Calima, Quimbaya, Muisca, Zenú, Tierradentro, San Agustín, Tolima, Tairona, and Urabá, and a special room called "After Columbus" (Después de Colón).

The exposition continues on the third floor, with "The Flying Chamanic" and "The Offering." The first shows the process of a shamanic ceremony with its different gold pieces, the second is divided into three parts: the "Offering Room", the "Offering Boat", and the "Lake".

At the end of the exposition, there is a "Profunditation Room" with artistic videos about the most important gold pieces of the museum.

On the fourth floor, the museum has an Exploratorium for the purpose of promoting interaction, participation and reflection around the diversity and meaning of the heritage preserved in the museum.

Additionally, the Museo del Oro also allows research visits and has a "specialized advisory service," through which researchers can access collections.

The museum has also engaged with internationally located museums in the past. In 2022, the Museo del Oro in Bogota loaned many works to Los Angeles County Museum of Art (LACMA) for an exhibition titled "The Portable Universe / El Universo en Tus Manos: Thought and Splendor of Indigenous Colombia." This exhibition comprised approximately 400 works, from figurative ceramics and ceremonial tools to textiles and metalworks.

== Gallery ==
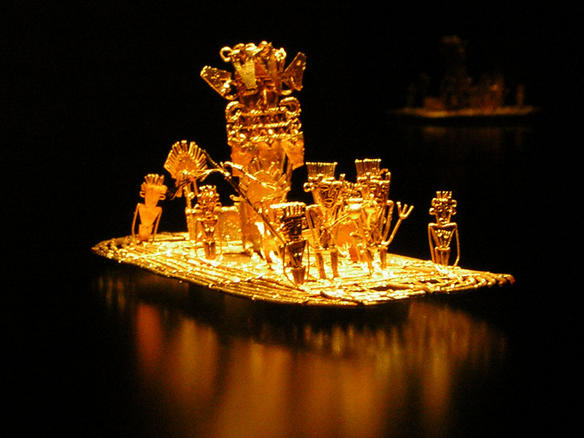
The Muisca raft is the main piece in the Offering Boat Room

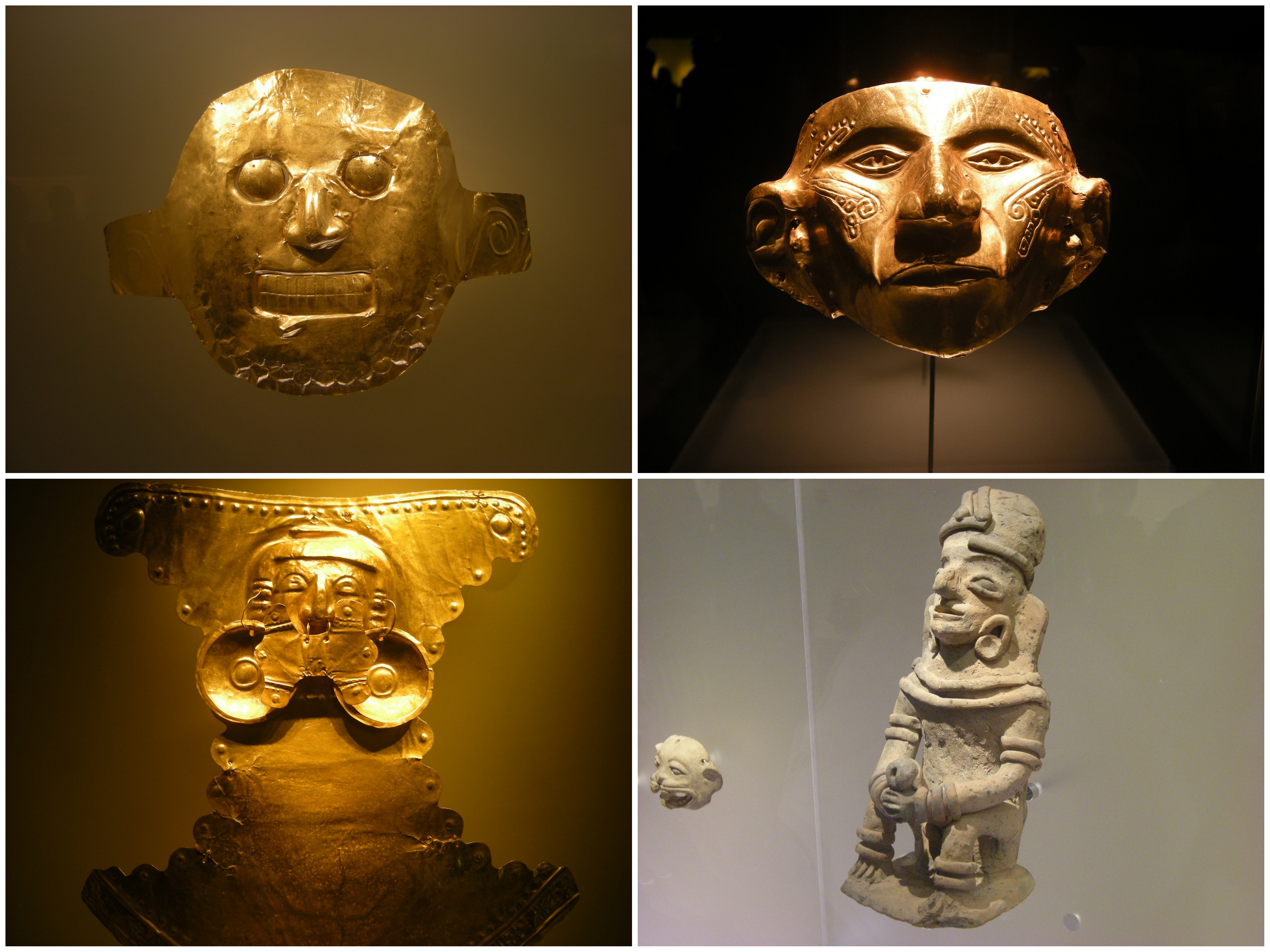
Gold pieces

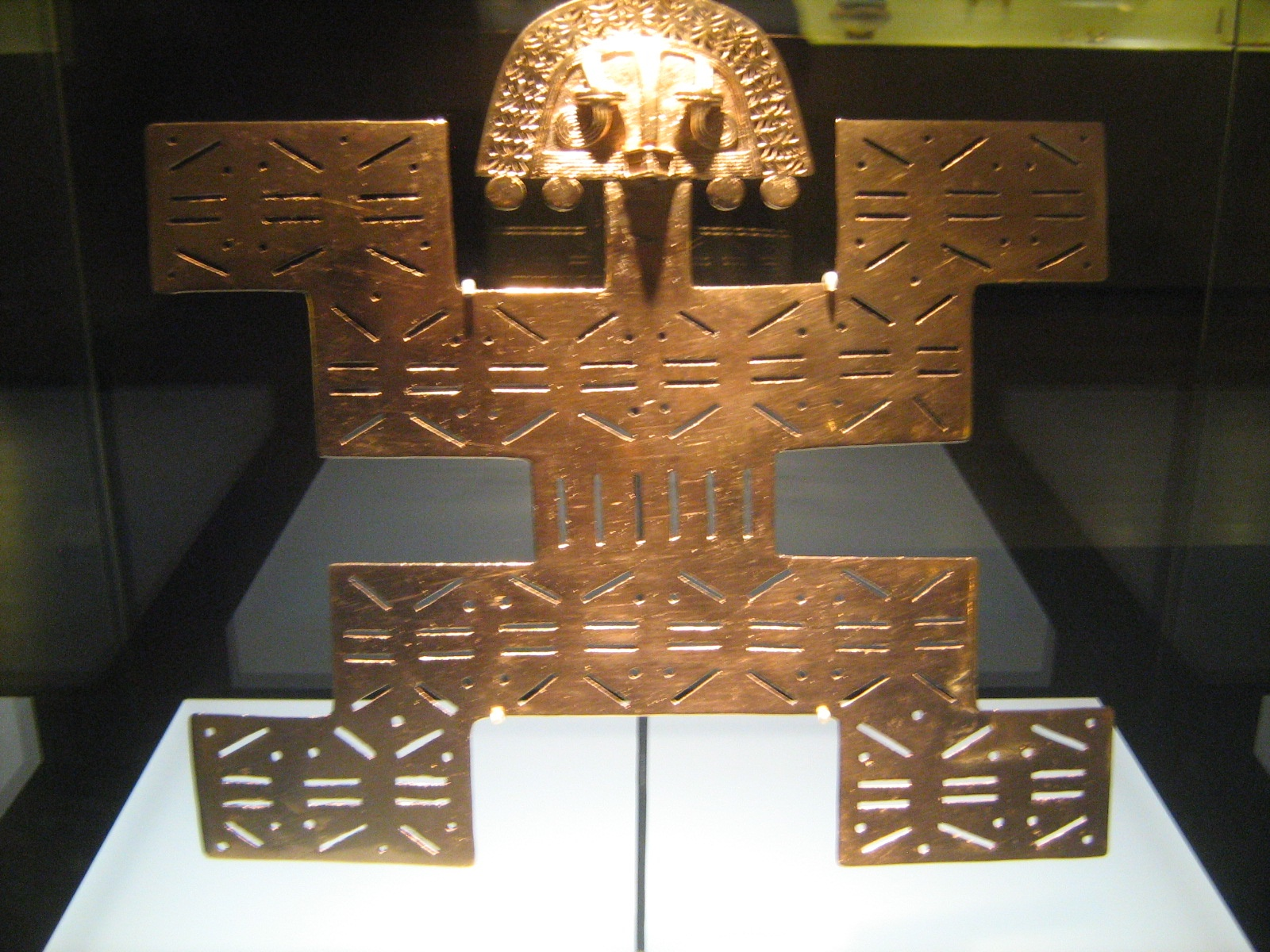
Pectoral Tolima culture

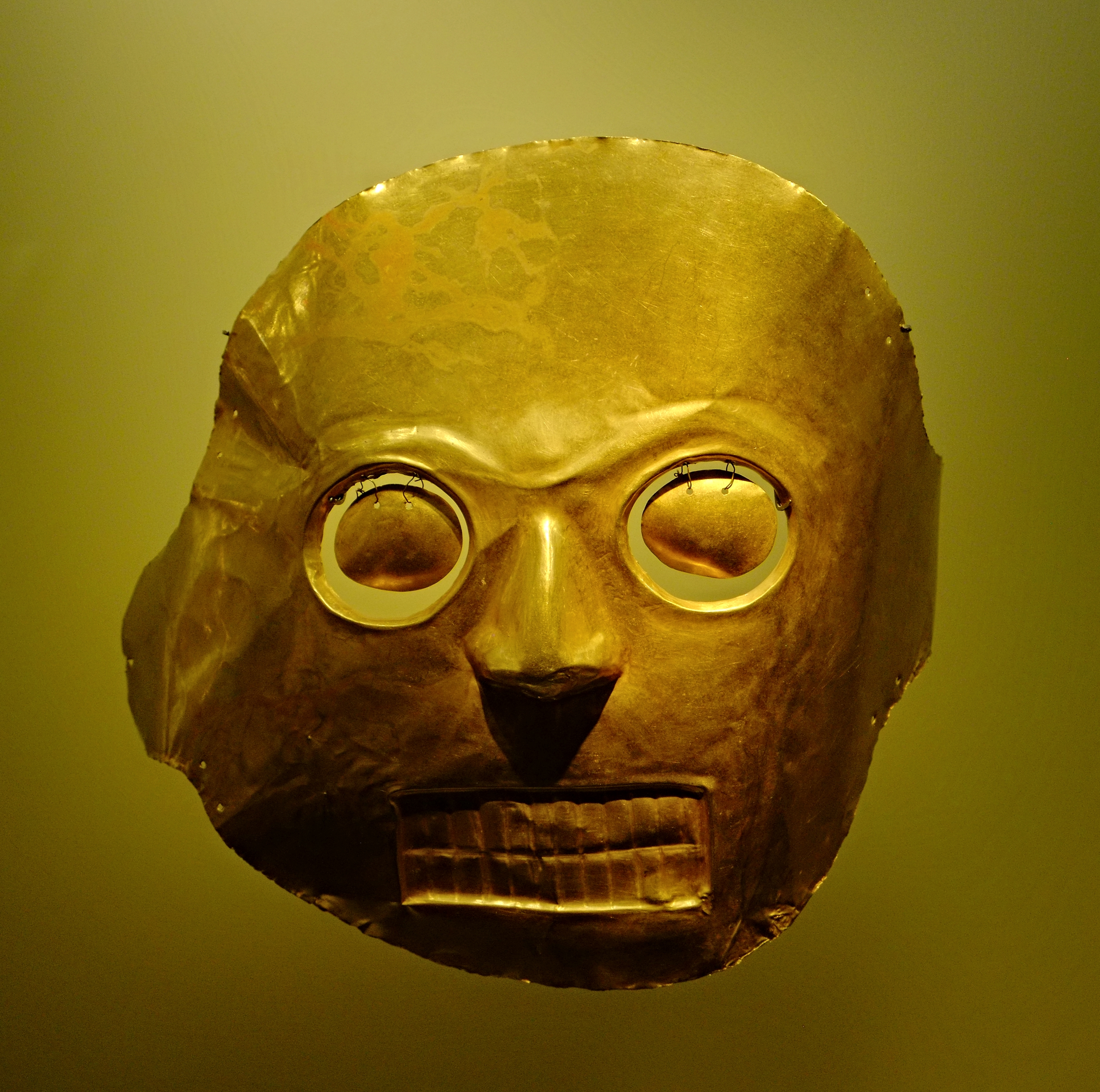
Golden mask

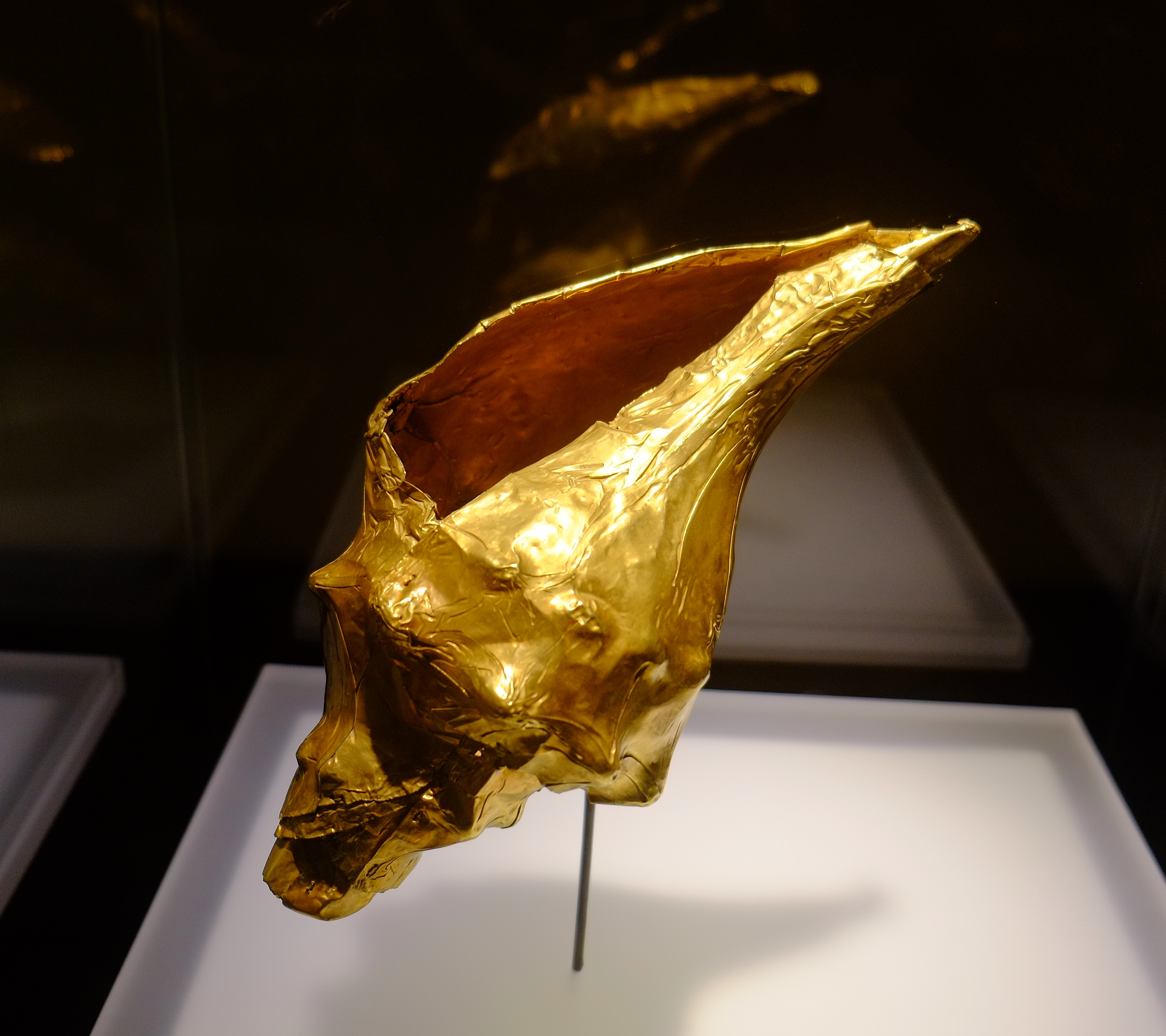
Muisca golden sea snail

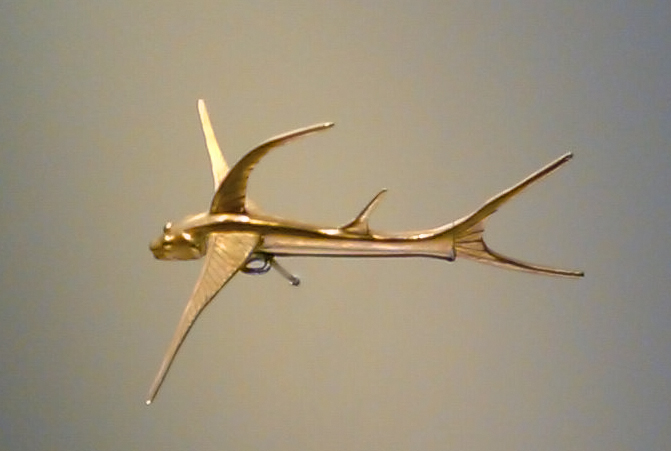
Golden fish

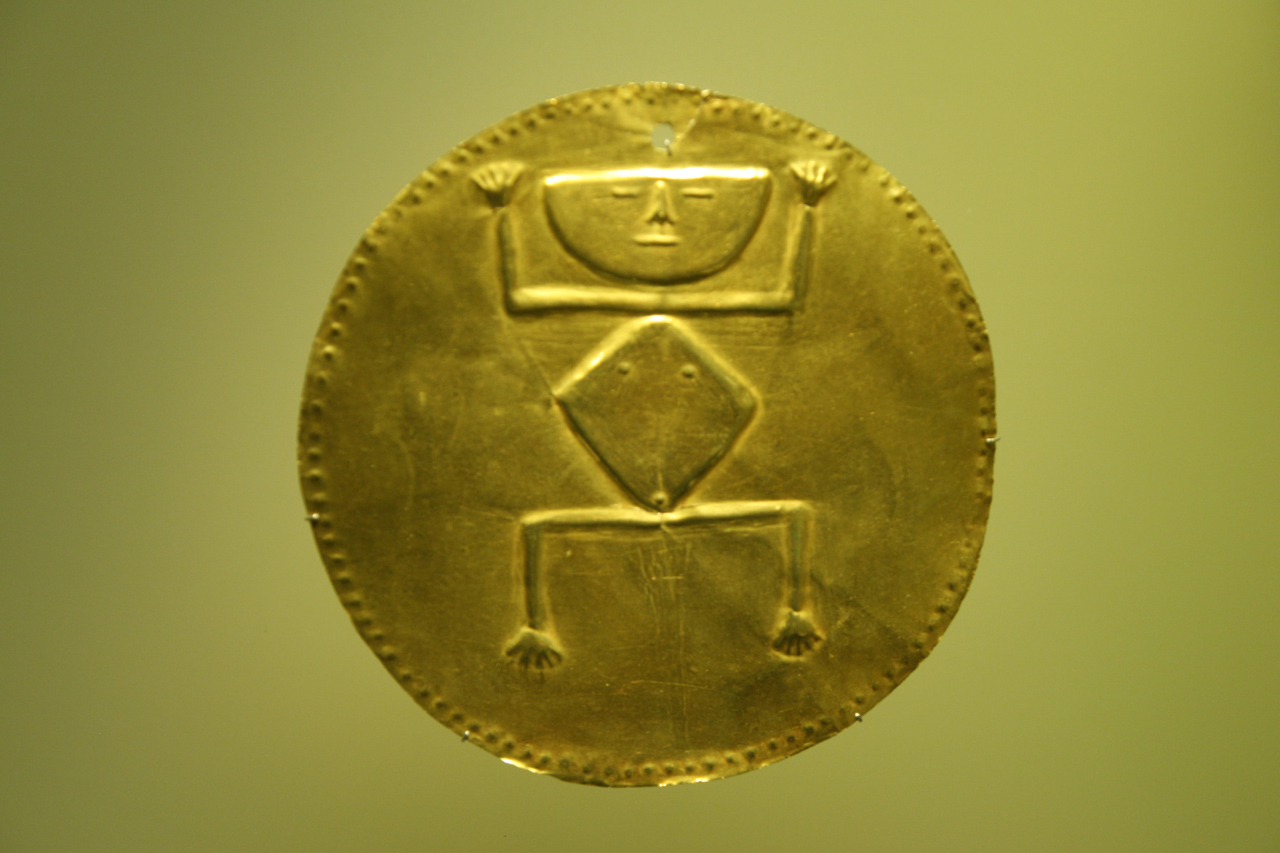
Golden plate

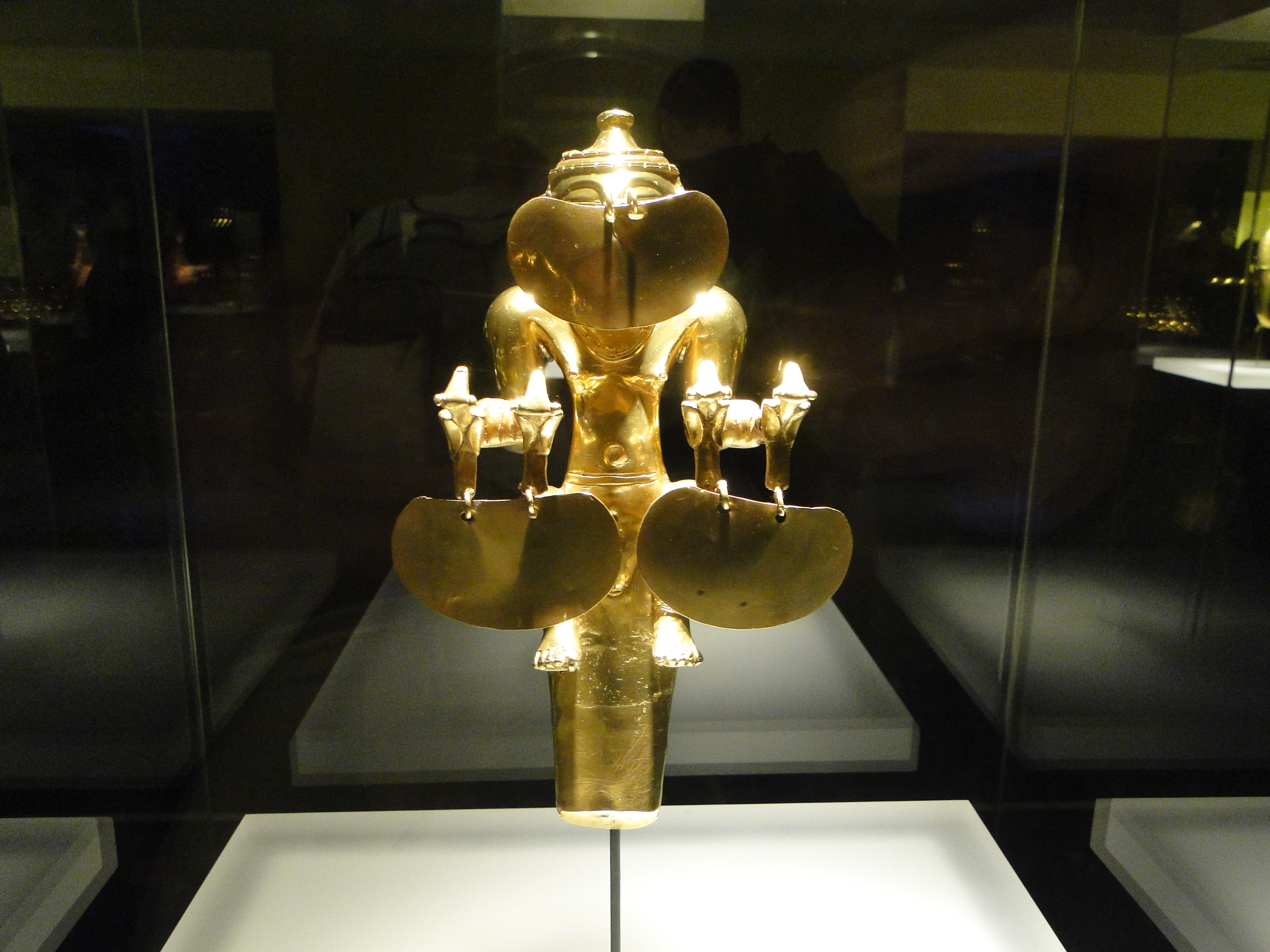
Golden figure
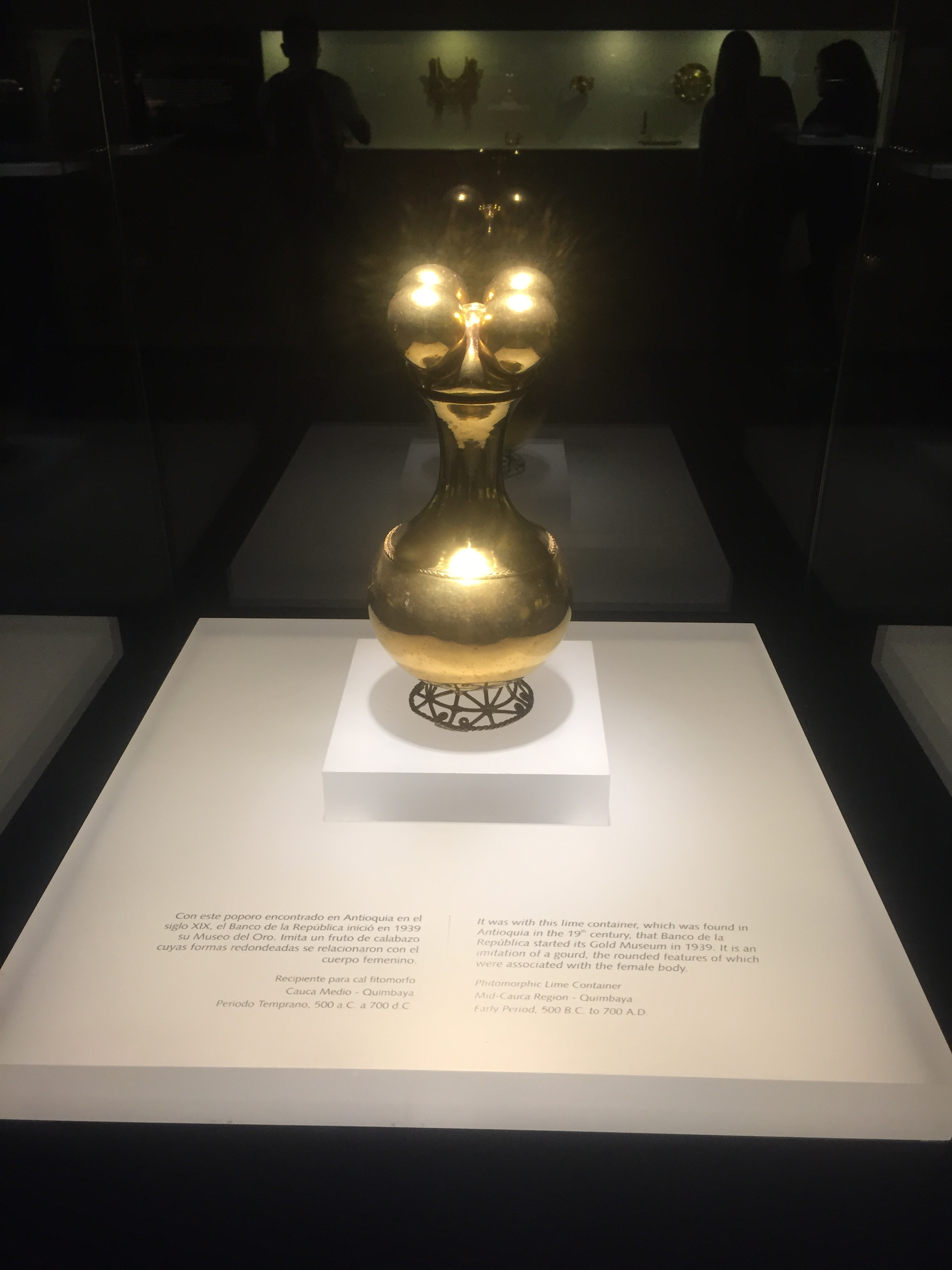
Quimbayan poporo

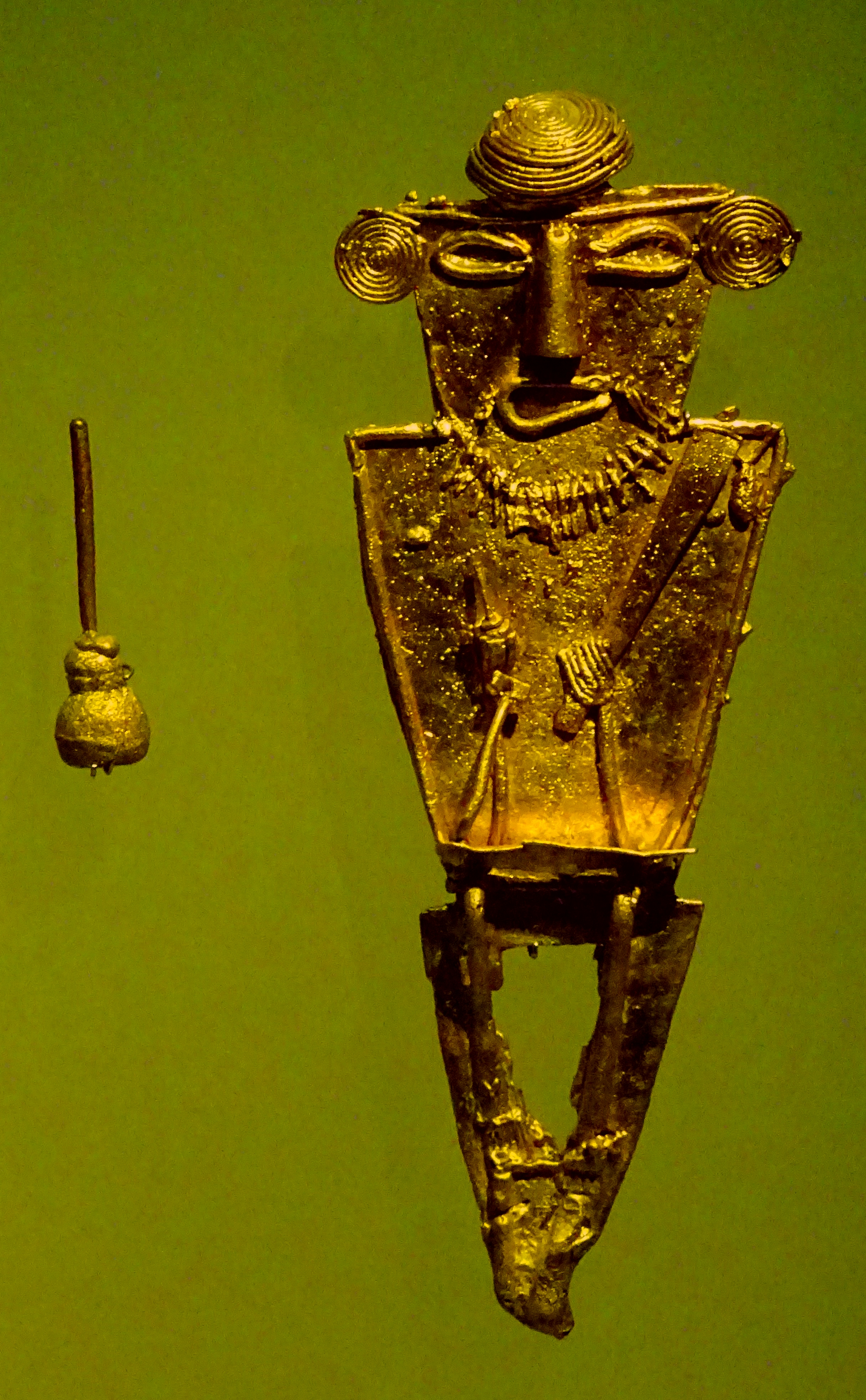
Tunjo

== See also ==
- Calima culture
- Calima Gold Museum
- Colombian mythology
- Indigenous peoples in Colombia
- Muisca
- Muisca art
- Quimbaya civilization
- Quimbaya Museum
