= Nicknames of San Francisco =

Slang terms for the city in California, U.S.

There are many nicknames of San Francisco, California that have been used throughout the city's history.

- AI Capital of the World – coined from the mid-2020s, reflecting the emergence and eventual prevalence of several artificial intelligence-oriented companies (otherwise known as start-ups or "unicorns") in the city.
- Baghdad by the Bay – title of a book of essays by Herb Caen, and a nickname he used for the city because of the cosmopolitan cultural diversity it shares with the medieval city of Baghdad
- Fog City / "City of Fog" – in reference to San Francisco's famous fog
- Frisco – also the nickname of the St. Louis–San Francisco Railway, it is a nickname disparaged by Herb Caen and some locals, but the word is still used today particularly by San Francisco's Black community.
- Gay Mecca
- Golden Gate City – in reference to the Golden Gate strait which is spanned by the Golden Gate Bridge
- San Fran – Used by non-native residents and those outside of the Bay Area. Curtis Sparrer from Bospar gives the reasons why it is not acceptable to say 'San Fran'.
- SF
- SFC (San Francisco City)
- Sunset City
- The city – used by native San Franciscans and people in the Bay Area
- The city by the Bay – refers to San Francisco Bay
- The City of Love – as seen in Cool, Gray City of Love by Gary Kamiya and in the lyrics of "San Francisco" by German eurodance group Cascada
- The City of Neighborhoods
- The City that Knows How
- The Golden City – in reference to the California Gold Rush and golden brown grass on hillsides in the dry season
- The Paris of the Pacific - affluent Gold Rush pioneers from France brought their food, fashion, and architecture to the city and became its largest minority
- The Paris of the West – popular in the early 1900s, but no longer in common use
