= List of World Heritage Sites in America =

List of World Heritage Sites in America could refer to:

- List of World Heritage Sites in the United States
- List of World Heritage Sites in Central America
- List of World Heritage Sites in North America
- List of World Heritage Sites in South America
