= List of World Heritage Sites in North America =

Below is a list of the UNESCO World Heritage Sites located in upper North America. Greenland has been included here as part of North America despite its cultural and political associations with Europe. The separate List of World Heritage Sites in Central America covers the continental areas further south. Mexico leads North America hosting 35 sites, and is ranked seventh in the world.

== World Heritage Sites ==
=== Legend ===
==== Endangered and trans-border sites ====
† In danger
* Trans-border site

==== Additional information ====
Site: as per officially inscribed name
Location: at city, regional, or provincial level and geocoordinates
Criteria: as defined by the World Heritage Committee
Area: in hectares and acres; if available, the size of the buffer zone noted as well
Year: during which the site was inscribed to the World Heritage List
Description: brief information about the site, including reasons for qualifying as an endangered site, if applicable

=== List ===
Site	Image	Location	Criteria	Area ha (acre)	Year	Description	Refs
20th-Century Architecture of Frank Lloyd Wright	Taliesin – Wright home, studio, training center	Various (eight locations) United States	Cultural: (ii)	26.369 (65.16)	2019	This listing consists of eight buildings designed by architect Frank Lloyd Wright, "reflecting the 'organic architecture' developed by Wright, which includes an open plan, a blurring of the boundaries between exterior and interior and the unprecedented use of materials such as steel and concrete." Wright's work influenced architecture internationally.	
Aasivissuit – Nipisat. Inuit Hunting Ground between Ice and Sea		Nipisat, western Greenland, Kingdom of Denmark; 67°3′50″N 51°25′59″W	Cultural: (v)	417,800 (1,032,000)	2018	Located inside the Arctic Circle in the central part of West Greenland, the site contains the remains of 4,200 years of human history. It is a cultural landscape which bears witness to its creators' hunting of land and sea animals, seasonal migrations and a rich and well-preserved tangible and intangible cultural heritage linked to climate, navigation and medicine. The features of the site include large winter houses and evidence of caribou hunting, as well as archaeological sites from Paleo-Inuit and Inuit cultures. The cultural landscape includes seven key localities, from Nipisat in the west to Aasivissuit, near the ice-cap in the east. It bears testimony to the resilience of the human cultures of the region and their traditions of seasonal migration.	
Agave Landscape and Ancient Industrial Facilities of Tequila	Agave fields in Tequila, Mexico.	Jalisco, Mexico; 20°51′47″N 103°46′43″W	Cultural: (ii), (iv), (v), (vi)	34,019 (84,060); buffer zone 51,261 (126,670)	2006	The site consists of a living, working landscape of blue agave fields and distilleries in Tequila, El Arenal and Amatitán where tequila is produced. It reflects more than 2,000 years of commercial use of the agave plant.	
Ancient Maya City and Protected Tropical Forests of Calakmul, Campeche	Pyramid with a staircase among a tropical forest.	Campeche, Mexico; 18°7′21″N 89°47′0″W	Mixed: (i), (ii), (iii), (iv), (ix), (x)	3,000 (7,400); buffer zone 147,195 (363,730)	2002	Calakmul is an important Maya site with a number of well-preserved monuments that bear testimony to twelve centuries of Maya cultural and political development.	
Anticosti	Satellite image of the island	Anticosti Island, Quebec; Canada; 49°30′00″N 63°00′00″W|	Natural: (viii)	18,240 (45,100); buffer zone 89,740 (221,800)	2023	The fossil assemblies at the Anticosti Island date from the late Ordovician to early Silurian periods, 450 to 435 million years ago. They offer an exceptional insight in the succession of marine life over 15 million years, including the near disappearance of marine species in the Late Ordovician mass extinction.	
Aqueduct of Padre Tembleque Hydraulic System	A tall, arched aqueduct in an arid landscape	Hidalgo and Estado de México, Mexico; 19°50′07″N 98°39′45″W	Cultural: (i), (ii), (iv)	6,540 (16,200); buffer zone 34,820 (86,000)	2015	Constructed between 1553 and 1570, the aqueduct is 45 kilometres (28 mi) long. It passes mostly at ground level, but also went underground as well as over ravines and valleys.	
Archaeological Monuments Zone of Xochicalco	Mexico xochicalco pyramids.	Miacatlán, Morelos; Mexico; 18°48′37″N 99°16′30″W	Cultural: (iii), (iv)	708 (1,750)	1999	Xochicalco is a well-preserved example of a fortified settlement from the epiclassical period (650–900), the time at which earlier powers such as Teotihuacan ceased to exist and cultural re-grouping took place.	
Archaeological Zone of Paquimé, Casas Grandes	Ruins of earthen houses.	Chihuahua, Mexico; 30°22′33″N 107°57′20″W	Cultural: (iii), (iv)	—	1998	The adobe architecture of Paquimé Casas Grandes bear testimony to a pre-Hispanic culture in northern Mexico located between the Pueblo culture and more advanced Mesoamerican civilizations.	
Archipiélago de Revillagigedo	Two owls standing at a burrow.	Mexico; 19°N 111°W	Natural: (vii), (ix), (x)	636,685 (1,573,280)	2016	Four islands with a population of 45. Located in the Pacific Ocean, they are known for their unique ecosystem.	
Cahokia Mounds State Historic Site	Large grassy mound. A flight of steps leads to the top of the mound.	Illinois, United States; 38°39′31″N 90°3′41″W	Cultural: (iii), (iv)	—	1982	The ancient city of Cahokia was the cultural, religious, and economic centre of the Mississippian culture. It was the earliest and largest pre-Columbian settlement north of Mexico.	
Camino Real de Tierra Adentro	Trailhead sign	Mexico; 22°36′N 102°23′W	Cultural: (ii), (iv)	3,102 (7,670); buffer zone 268,057 (662,380)	2010	The site consists of a 1,400 km (870 mi) long section of a 2,600 km (1,600 mi) long trade route ("Silver Road") that was used from the mid-16th to 19th century to transport mainly silver from mines in northern Mexico and mercury imported from Europe. In addition to the road, associated properties such as five urban centres (Note: The five sites are: Historic Centre of Mexico City and Xochimilco, Historic Monuments Zone of Querétaro, Historic Town of Guanajuato and Adjacent Mines, Protective town of San Miguel and the Sanctuary of Jesús Nazareno de Atotonilco, Historic Centre of Zacatecas.) that have been designated separately as World Heritage Sites, religious and other buildings are included in the nomination.	
Canadian Rocky Mountain Parks	Lake and forest in front of high rocky mountains with snow.	Alberta and British Columbia, Canada; 51°25′N 116°29′W	Natural: (vii), (viii)	2,306,884 (5,700,430)	1984 (Note: Extended in 1990 to include Mount Robson, Hamber and Mount Assiniboine Provincial Parks.)	With high peaks, glaciers, lakes, waterfalls, canyons and limestone caves, the national parks that make up this site exemplify the exceptional features of the Rocky Mountains. Furthermore, one of the world's most celebrated fossil fields, the Burgess Shale Formation is located within the inscribed property.	
Carlsbad Caverns National Park	Column and array of stalactites in a cave.	New Mexico, United States; 32°10′0″N 104°23′0″W	Natural: (vii), (viii)	18,926 (46,770)	1995	More than 80 limestone caves notable for their size and decorative rock formations (speleothems), some of which are assisted by bacteria, are included in the property. Their ease of access facilitates scientific research.	
Central University City Campus of the National Autonomous University of Mexico	Tall square-shaped building decorated on the outside with murals.	Mexico City, Mexico; 19°19′56″N 99°11′17″W	Cultural: (i), (ii), (iv)	177 (440); buffer zone 1,102 (2,720)	2007	Built from 1949 and 1952 by more than 60 architects, the buildings, open spaces and sports facilities combine modern architecture with references to local pre-Hispanic traditions. They showcase universal ideals such as access to education and improvement in the quality of life that were prevalent in post-revolutionary Mexico.	
Chaco Culture	Ruins of a circular and rectangular buildings made of stones.	New Mexico, United States; 36°3′50″N 107°58′15″W	Cultural: (iii)	—	1987	Notable for its monumental buildings, the site bears testimony to a Pueblo culture that dominated large parts of present-day south-western United States from the mid-9th to early 13th centuries.	
Dinosaur Provincial Park	A skeleton of a dinosaur.	Alberta, Canada; 50°46′4″N 111°29′32″W	Natural: (vii), (viii)	7,493 (18,520)	1979	The park is noted for the beauty of its badland landscape and as a major fossil site. Specimens of every group of Cretaceous dinosaurs have been found here including those of 35 species dating more than 75 Million years ago.	
Earliest 16th-century Monasteries on the Slopes of Popocatepetl	Front of a big-sized Baroque church and its complex in part.	Morelos and Puebla, Mexico; 18°56′N 98°54′W	Cultural: (ii), (iv)	—	1994	The site comprises 14 monasteries built by Augustinians, Franciscans and Dominicans near Popocatépetl volcano. Stylistically they are characterized by an emphasize on open spaces, a concept that influenced architecture in Mexico and beyond.	
El Pinacate and Gran Desierto de Altar Biosphere Reserve	El Pinacate Reserve biome.	Sonora, Mexico; 32°00′00″N 113°55′00″W	Natural: (vii), (viii), (x)	714,566 (1,765,730); buffer zone 354,871 (876,910);	2013	The 714,566-hectare site comprises two distinct parts: the dormant volcanic Pinacate Shield of black and red lava flows and desert pavements to the east, and, in the west, the Gran Altar Desert with its ever-changing and varied sand dunes that can reach a height of 200 metres. This landscape of dramatic contrast notably features linear, star and dome dunes as well as several arid granite massifs, some as high as 650 metres.	
Prehistoric city of El Tajín	Ruins of a stone pyramid with about five levels. Each side of a step contains niches.	Veracruz, Mexico; 20°28′35″N 97°22′39″W	Cultural: (iii), (iv)	—	1992	Flourishing from the early 9th to early 13th century, El Tajin is the prime site of the period between the Teotihuacan and Tenochtitlan empires.	
Everglades National Park^{†}	A large white bird with black wingtips and a long slightly curved beak is perched on a branch above grassland.	Florida, United States; 25°19′N 80°56′W	Natural: (viii), (ix), (x)	592,920 (1,465,100)	1979	The vast wetlands and coastal/marine habitats of the park have made it a sanctuary for many animals including 20 rare, endangered and threatened species such as the Florida panther and the manatee. The site has been endangered from 1993 to 2007 following damage due to Hurricane Andrew and since 2010 due to continued degradation and a loss of marine habitat.	
Franciscan Missions in the Sierra Gorda of Querétaro	Facade of a church with one tower. The main portal is richly decorated with relief and sculptures and features a clock at the top.	Querétaro, Mexico; 21°12′16″N 99°27′51″W	Cultural: (ii), (iii)	104 (260)	2003	These five missions were built jointly with the indios towards the final phase of Christianization of Mexico in the mid-18th century. They played an important role in the further evangelization of California, Arizona and Texas.	
Grand Canyon National Park	Very wide and deep canyon with some vegetation.	Arizona, United States; 36°6′3″N 112°5′26″W	Natural: (vii), (viii), (ix), (x)	493,077 (1,218,420)	1979	Plunging down 1,500 m (4,900 ft) to the Colorado River, it is one of the world's most spectacular gorges. In addition the varying elevations of the canyon walls have created diverse ecosystems for numerous endemic, rare and endangered species. The river's erosion has exposed soils from the Precambrian to the Cenozoic often including a rich fossil assembly.	
Great Smoky Mountains National Park	Densely forested mountains.	Tennessee and North Carolina, United States; 35°36′N 83°26′W	Natural: (vii), (viii), (ix), (x)	209,000 (520,000)	1983	With more than 3,500 plant species, the park is among the largest remnants of Arcto-Tertiary Geoflora. It is also home to the world's largest number of salamander species and famous for its mist-shrouded virgin forests.	
Gros Morne National Park	Mountain landscape with little vegetation and ocher stones.	Newfoundland and Labrador, Canada; 49°37′N 57°32′W	Natural: (vii), (viii)	180,500 (446,000)	1987	With deep ocean crust and rocks of the Earth's mantle lying exposed, the park illustrates continental drift. Landlocked freshwater fjords, glacier-scoured headlands in an ocean setting contribute to the natural beauty of this wilderness area.	
Head-Smashed-In Buffalo Jump	A line of rocks overlooking a plain.	Alberta; Canada; 49°44′58″N 113°37′26″W	Cultural: (vi)	—	1981	The property consists of remains of a camp, of trails and a tumulus of bones of the American bison bearing testimony to nearly 6000 years of communal hunting in which the bisons were driven over a cliff, a practice known as buffalo jump.	
Historic Town of St George and Related Fortifications, Bermuda	White houses near the sea.	St. George; Bermuda, United Kingdom; 32°22′46″N 64°40′40″W	Cultural: (iv)	258 (640)	2000	The oldest English town in the New World, St George's fortifications bear testimony to the development of English military architecture from the 17th to 20th centuries.	
Historic Centre of Mexico City and Xochimilco	Roofed barges with many people on a canal.	Mexico City, Mexico; 19°25′6″N 99°7′58″W	Cultural: (ii), (iii), (iv), (v)	—	1987	Mexico City, built in the 16th century on the ruins of Tenochtitlan preserves Aztec ruins, the largest cathedral in the Americas and 19th/20th century public architecture. Xochimilco is characterized by a network of canals and artificial islands (chinampas) built in pre-Hispanic times.	
Historic Centre of Morelia	Large church with two main towers and two cuppolas.	Michoacán, Mexico; 19°42′16″N 101°11′30″W	Cultural: (ii), (iv), (vi)	390 (960)	1991	Built in the 16th century, Morelia still shows the original street layout and has more than 200 historic buildings constructed of locally available pink stone in a style fusing elements of renaissance, baroque and neo-classicism.	
Historic Centre of Oaxaca and Archaeological Site of Monte Albán	Ruins of a two-level stone platform. A wide staircase is leading up on one side and there are parts of columns on the upper platform.	Oaxaca, Mexico; 17°3′43″N 96°43′18″W	Cultural: (i), (ii), (iii), (iv)	375 (930); buffer zone 121 (300)	1987	The site includes the pre-Columbian ceremonial site Monte Albán occupied during a 1500-year period by Olmecs, Zapotecs and Mixtecs, the colonial town Oaxaca founded in 1529 and the originally Mixtec settlement Cuilapan where Dominicans established a major monastery in the mid-16th century.	
Historic Centre of Puebla	Historical buildings and a church bell tower.	Puebla, Puebla, Mexico; 19°2′50″N 98°12′13″W	Cultural: (ii), (iv)	690 (1,700)	1987	Puebla has preserved all of its ancient buildings, its 16th century cathedral and the largely episcopal palace, also hosts houses with walls covered in talavera azulejos tiles, a local tradition since colonial times.	
Historic Centre of Zacatecas	Calle Hidalgo in the Historic Centre of Zacatecas	Zacatecas, Zacatecas, Mexico; 22°46′0″N 102°33′20″W	Cultural: (ii), (iv)	110 (270)	1993	Zacatecas prospered as a center of silver production in the 16th and 17th centuries. The designated property comprises religious and secular buildings with most of them dating to the 17th and 18th centuries.	
Historic District of Old Québec	Old Quebec.	Quebec City, Quebec; Canada; 46°48′34″N 71°12′38″W	Cultural: (iv), (vi)	—	1985	Founded by the French in the 17th century, the urban ensemble of Old Québec is the most complete example of a European fortified town north of Mexico.	
Historic Fortified Town of Campeche	Brightly colored houses with balconies.	Campeche, Campeche, Mexico; 19°50′47″N 90°32′14″W	Cultural: (ii), (iv)	181 (450)	1999	Campeche is a typical example of a Baroque Spanish colonial town with a grid layout. Its fortifications built in the 17th and 18th centuries as defense against pirates are an excellent example of military architecture of the time.	
Historic Monuments Zone of Querétaro	Iglesia de Santo Domingo.	Querétaro, Querétaro, Mexico; 20°35′0″N 100°22′0″W	Cultural: (ii), (iv)	—	1996	Querétaro has preserved many of its buildings from the 17th and 18th century and is exceptional for its street plan which has both, the grid plan typical of Spanish colonial towns and twisting alleys in the Indian quarters.	
Historic Monuments Zone of Tlacotalpan	Main plaza.	Tlacotalpan, Veracruz, Mexico; 18°36′30″N 95°39′30″W	Cultural: (ii), (iv)	—	1998	The layout and architecture of the property is an exceptionally well-preserved example of Spanish-Caribbean fusion and is characterised by wide streets, low houses in a variety of styles and colors, and many trees.	
Historic Town of Guanajuato and Adjacent Mines	Yellow and red church with cuppolas and two towers one of which has a clock.	Guanajuato, Guanajuato, Mexico; 21°1′1″N 101°15′20″W	Cultural: (i), (ii), (iv), (vi)	190 (470)	1988	The prosperity of the town as the largest silver producer in the 18th century is reflected in beautiful Baroque and neo-classical buildings.	
Hopewell Ceremonial Earthworks		Ohio, United States; 39°22′33″N 83°0′23″W	Cultural: (i), (iii)	321 (790); buffer zone 562 (1,390)	2023		
Hospicio Cabañas, Guadalajara	Entrance to a major stone building with colonnades and bells above the main entrance.	Guadalajara, Jalisco, Mexico; 20°40′26″N 103°20′23″W	Cultural: (i), (ii), (iii), (iv)	—	1997	The early 19th century Hospicio is one of the earliest hospital complexes in Spanish America. Its architecture, designed with this purpose in mind, contains several unique features and is notable for the size, simplicity and relationship between open and built spaces. A series of murals by José Clemente Orozco is located within the complex.	
Ilulissat Icefjord	Icebergs in the sea.	Ilulissat, western Greenland, Kingdom of Denmark; 69°8′N 49°30′W	Natural: (vii), (viii)	402,400 (994,000)	2004	The Jakobshavn Glacier, calves into the Ilulissat fjord is one of the most active glaciers, moving at 19 metres/day and accounting for 10% of the Greenlandish calf ice. Similar phenomena exist in Antarctica, however its relative ease of access for scientists and visitors makes it unique in the world.	
Independence Hall	Two-storied red brick building and behind it a clock tower.	Philadelphia, Pennsylvania, United States; 39°56′55″N 75°9′0″W	Cultural: (vi)	—	1979	Both the Declaration of Independence and the United States Constitution were signed in this building. Concepts of freedom and democracy set forth in these documents have influenced charters of many countries and the UN charter.	
Islands and Protected Areas of the Gulf of California^{†}	Gulf of California	Baja California, Baja California Sur, Sonora, Sinaloa and Nayarit, Mexico; 27°38′N 112°33′W	Natural: (vii), (ix), (x)	—	2005 (Note: Minor modification of boundaries in 2007 to include the Islas Marietas National Park and the San Lorenzo Marine Archipelago National Park.)	The property has marine and insular habitats including bridge islands (Note: Islands populated by land in times of ocean level decline.) and oceanic islands. (Note: Islands populated by sea and air) It constitutes a unique ecoregion of exceptional biodiversity with 695 species of plant, 891 species of fish (90 of which are endemic), 39 percent of the world's marine mammal species, and a large number of bird species. The site was added to the List of World Heritage in Danger because of the imminent extinction of the vaquita, an endemic porpoise in the gulf.	
Joggins Fossil Cliffs	Fossilized tree trunk in a rock face.	Nova Scotia; Canada; 45°42′35″N 64°26′9″W	Natural: (viii)	689 (1,700); buffer zone 29 (72)	2008	This paleontological site contains the most complete terrestrial fossil record of the Carboniferous period including tracks of early animals and of the rainforest they lived in.	
Kluane / Wrangell-St Elias / Glacier Bay / Tatshenshini-Alsek	A glacier, mountains of black gravel and snowcovered mountains.	British Columbia and Yukon, Canada*; Alaska, United States* 61°12′N 141°0′W	Natural: (vii), (viii), (ix), (x)	9,839,121 (24,313,000)	1979 (Note: Extended in 1992 to include the Glacier Bay National Park and in 1994 to include the Tatshenshini-Alsek Provincial Park. The name of the site was changed accordingly from Wrangell/St. Elias/Kluane at the time of inscription to Glacier Bay/Wrangell/St. Elias/Kluane in 1992 to the present name in 1994.)	These parks comprise the world's largest non-polar icefield, some of the largest glaciers and a tectonically active mountain landscape. They are home to a number of species endangered elsewhere such as bears, wolves, caribou and Dall sheep.	
Kujataa Greenland: Norse and Inuit Farming at the Edge of the Ice Cap	Qassiarsuk farms on the shores of Tunulliarfik Fjord	Kujalleq, southern Greenland, Kingdom of Denmark; 61°9′52″N 45°35′52″W	Cultural: (v)	34,892 (86,220)	2017	Kujataa is a subarctic farming landscape located in the southern region of Greenland. It bears witness to the cultural histories of the Norse farmer-hunters who started arriving from Iceland in the 10th century and of the Inuit hunters and Inuit farming communities that developed from the end of the 18th century. Despite their differences, the two cultures, European Norse and Inuit, created a cultural landscape based on farming, grazing and marine mammal hunting. The landscape represents the earliest introduction of farming to the Arctic, and the Norse expansion of settlement beyond Europe.	
Landscape of Grand Pré	Statue of Longfellow's Evangeline (by Louis-Philippe Hébert) and memorial church.	Nova Scotia, Canada; 45°7′6″N 64°18′26″W	Cultural: (v), (vi)	1,323 (3,270)	2012	Site to commemorate the Grand-Pré area of Nova Scotia as a centre of Acadian settlement from 1682 to 1755, and the British deportation of the Acadians that happened during the French and Indian War.	
L'Anse aux Meadows National Historic Site	Grass-covered house with wooden chimneys.	Newfoundland and Labrador; Canada; 51°28′0″N 55°37′0″W	Cultural: (vi)	—	1978	These remains of an 11th-century Viking settlement are the first and only known site of Norse presence and the earliest known European settlement in America outside of Greenland.	
Luis Barragán House and Studio	House consisting of differently colored blocks: grey, pink, red, white.	Mexico City, Mexico; 19°25′6″N 99°11′54″W	Cultural: (i), (ii)	0.12 (0.30); buffer zone 23 (57)	2004	Built in 1948, the house and studio of Mexican architect Luis Barragán combines traditional and modern influences and is considered a masterpiece of the Modern Movement.	
Mammoth Cave National Park	A cave with layered rocks. At the end of the cave there is a light.	Kentucky, United States; 37°11′14″N 86°6′11″W	Natural: (vii), (viii), (x)	21,191 (52,360)	1981	The longest cave system known in the world.	
Mesa Verde National Park	Ruins of circular and rectangular buildings under an overhanging cliff.	Colorado, United States; 37°15′42″N 108°29′8″W	Cultural: (iii)	—	1978	Protects some of the best preserved Ancestral Puebloan archaeological sites in the U.S. Starting circa 7500 BC, Mesa Verde was seasonally inhabited by a group of nomadic Paleo-Indians known as the Foothills Mountain Complex. The variety of projectile points found in the region indicates they were influenced by surrounding areas, including the Great Basin, the San Juan Basin, and the Rio Grande Valley. Later, Archaic people established semi-permanent rockshelters in and around the mesa.	
Miguasha National Park	Forested mountains with rocks and pebble beach.	Gaspé Peninsula, Quebec; Canada; 48°6′18″N 66°21′11″W	Natural: (viii)	87 (210)	1999	Protects thousands of fossils in eastern Quebec that are 350 to 375 million years old.	
Mistaken Point	An Ediacaran fossil found at Mistaken Point.	Newfoundland and Labrador; Canada; 46°37′55″N 53°11′25″W	Natural: (viii)	146 (360)	2016	Area around the Mistaken Point Formation: protection of Ediacaran fossils representing the oldest multicellular life on Earth.	
Monarch Butterfly Biosphere Reserve	A large number of orange butterflies in flight.	Michoacán and Mexico State, Mexico; 19°36′23″N 100°14′30″W	Natural: (vii)	13,552 (33,490); buffer zone 42,707 (105,530)	2008	Site containing most of the overwintering sites of the eastern population of the monarch butterfly. The reserve is located in the Trans-Mexican Volcanic Belt pine-oak forests ecoregion on the border of Michoacán and State of Mexico, 100 km (62 miles), northwest of Mexico City.	
Monticello and the University of Virginia in Charlottesville	Red brick building with a white classicist columned entrance.	Virginia, United States; 38°1′58″N 78°30′14″W	Cultural: (i), (iv), (vi)	—	1987	Built between 1769 and 1809, Monticello was the plantation home of its designer, third President of the United States and author of the Declaration of Independence, Thomas Jefferson. Jefferson designed the early buildings that made up the University of Virginia in Charlottesville, inspired by his new ideas of university planning. The most prominent of these, The Rotunda, is a half-scale model of the Pantheon in Rome.	
Pimachiowin Aki	Rock wall at Woodland Caribou Provincial Park.	Manitoba and Ontario, Canada; 51°49′0″N 95°24′0″W	Cultural: (iii), (vi), (ix)	2,904,000 (7,180,000); buffer zone 3,592,000 (8,880,000)	2018		
Monumental Earthworks of Poverty Point		Louisiana, United States; 32°38′13″N 91°24′23″W	Cultural: (iii)	163 (400)	2014	Comprises several earthworks and mounds, built between 1650 and 700 BC during the archaic period in North America, by a group of Native Americans of the Poverty Point culture. The culture extended 100 miles (160 km) across the Mississippi Delta.	
Nahanni National Park	Large but relatively low waterfall through rocks.	Northwest Territories; Canada; 61°33′N 125°35′W	Natural: (vii), (viii)	476,560 (1,177,600)	1978	Protects a portion of the Mackenzie Mountains (Dehcho Region) and four canyons reaching 1,000 m (3,300 ft) in depth.	
Old Town Lunenburg	Churches and brightly colored houses near the water.	Nova Scotia; Canada; 44°22′34″N 64°18′33″W	Cultural: (iv), (v)	—	1995	The town was one of the first British attempts to settle Protestants in Nova Scotia intended to displace Mi'kmaq and Acadian Catholics. It was founded during Father Le Loutre's War on Mahone Bay.	
Olympic National Park	Rocky coastline with trees on the top of the rocks.	Washington, United States; 47°45′N 123°27′W	Natural: (vii), (ix)	369,660 (913,400)	1981	Located on the Olympic Peninsula, the park has four basic regions: the Pacific coastline, alpine areas, the west side temperate rainforest and the forests of the drier east side.	
Pre-Hispanic City and National Park of Palenque	Ruins and walls of structures. A four storied square tower is in relatively good condition. The site is surrounded by forest.	Chiapas, Mexico; 17°29′0″N 92°3′0″W	Cultural: (i), (ii), (iii), (iv)	—	1987		
Pre-Hispanic City of Chichen-Itza	A large nine-storied stone pyramid with smoothed surfaces and stairs leading to the top from at least two sides. At the top of the pyramid there is a square structure with flat roof and entrances from both visible sides.	Yucatán, Mexico; 20°40′0″N 88°36′0″W	Cultural: (i), (ii), (iii)	—	1988		
Pre-Hispanic City of Teotihuacan	A large stone pyramid with smoothed surfaces and stairs leading to the top. Smaller pyramids of about 4 levels are surrounding a large square and line a wide road.	State of Mexico, Mexico; 19°41′30″N 98°50′30″W	Cultural: (i), (ii), (iii), (iv), (vi)	—	1987		
Pre-Hispanic Town of Uxmal	Stone pyramid with smooth surfaces and rounded corners. A staircase on one side leads to a structure at the top of the pyramid.	Yucatán, Mexico; 20°21′42″N 89°46′13″W	Cultural: (i), (ii), (iii)	—	1996		
Prehistoric Caves of Yagul and Mitla in the Central Valley of Oaxaca	Ruins of a building decorated with geometric patterns in relief. A flight of steps lined by red walls leads to the entrance of the building.	Oaxaca, Mexico; 16°57′3″N 96°25′16″W	Cultural: (iii)	1,515 (3,740); buffer zone 3,860 (9,500)	2010		
Protective town of San Miguel and the Sanctuary of Jesús Nazareno de Atotonilco	Church with a coppola and massive castle-like walls with small windows.	Guanajuato, Mexico; 20°54′52″N 100°44′47″W	Cultural: (ii), (iv)	47 (120); buffer zone 47 (120)	2008		
Pueblo de Taos	A cluster of reddish brown small adobe houses with blue doors and window frames.	New Mexico, United States; 36°26′20″N 105°32′30″W	Cultural: (iv)	—	1992		
Red Bay Basque Whaling Station	Basque whaling station on Saddle Island.	Newfoundland and Labrador; Canada; 51°43′37″N 56°25′46″W	Cultural: (iii), (iv)	313 (770); buffer zone 285 (700)	2013		
Redwood National and State Parks	Forest with undergrowth.	California, United States; 41°22′N 124°0′W	Natural: (vii), (ix)	56,883 (140,560)	1980		
Rideau Canal	A small canal with a set of locks leading from a river near a large city.	Ontario; Canada; 45°0′N 75°46′W	Cultural: (i), (iv)	21,455 (53,020); buffer zone 2,363 (5,840)	2007	The Rideau Canal (French: Canal Rideau) connects Ottawa to Lake Ontario and the Saint Lawrence River. It was opened in 1832 as a precaution in case of war with the United States and is still in use today, with most of its original structures intact. The canal system uses sections of major rivers, including the Rideau and the Cataraqui, as well as some lakes. It is the oldest continuously operated canal system in North America.	
Rock Paintings of the Sierra de San Francisco	Prehistoric rock art pictographs of the Cochimi in the Sierra de San Francisco mountain range.	Baja California Sur, Mexico; 27°39′20″N 112°54′58″W	Cultural: (i), (iii)	—	1993		
San Antonio Missions	Stone church building with a tiered belltower	Texas, United States; 29°19′41″N 98°27′36″W	Cultural: (ii)	301 (740); buffer zone 2,068 (5,110)	2015		
SGang Gwaay	Clearance in a forest.	British Columbia, Canada; 52°5′42″N 131°13′13″W	Cultural: (iii)	—	1981		
Sian Ka'an	Bay or other water near the sea. The floor is visible through the water. In the distance there is a sandy beach, forested areas and the sea.	Quintana Roo, Mexico; 19°23′N 87°48′W	Natural: (vii), (x)	528,000 (1,300,000)	1987		
Statue of Liberty	Statue of a robed female figure bearing a torch in her right outstretched arm and a tablet in the other.	New York City, New York, United States; 40°41′22″N 74°2′41″W	Cultural: (i), (vi)	—	1984		
Tehuacán-Cuicatlán Biosphere Reserve	The landscape of the xeric Tehuacán Valley matorral ecoregion, near San Antonio Texcala in Puebla state.	Oaxaca and Puebla, Mexico; 18°12′41″N 97°23′58″W	Mixed: (iv), (x)	145,255.2 (358,933); buffer zone 344,931.68 (852,344.7)	2018		
Tr’ondëk-Klondike	Klondikers carrying supplies ascending the Chilkoot Pass, 1898.	Yukon, Canada; Eight locations, including Dawson City at 64.059643°N 139.432774°W	Cultural: (iv)	334.54 (826.7); buffer zone 351.7 (869)	2023		
Waterton Glacier International Peace Park	Cameron Lake, Waterton Glacier International Peace Park.	Alberta, Canada*; Montana, United States* 49°0′N 113°54′W	Natural: (vii), (ix)	457,614 (1,130,790)	1995		
Whale Sanctuary of El Vizcaino	El Vizcaino protected island, gulf of California.	Mulegé Municipality, Baja California Sur, Mexico; 27°48′N 114°14′W	Natural: (x)	370,950 (916,600)	1993		
Wixárika Route through Sacred Sites to Wirikuta (Tatehuarí Huajuyé)		Durango, Jalisco, Nayarit, San Luis Potosi and Zacatecas Mexico; 22°35′49.2″N 103°16′48″W	Cultural: (iii), (vi)	135,421 (334,630); buffer zone 513,966 (1,270,040)	2025		
Wood Buffalo National Park	Frontal view of a buffalo.	Alberta and Northwest Territories, Canada; 59°22′N 112°18′W	Natural: (vii), (ix), (x)	4,480,000 (11,100,000)	1983		
Writing-on-Stone / Áísínai'pi	Áísínai'pi	County of Warner No. 5, Alberta, Canada	Cultural: iii	1,106 (2,730)	2019	The site contains the greatest concentration of rock art on the North American Great Plains and is sacred to the Niitsítapi (Blackfoot) people.	
Yellowstone National Park	Large waterfall in a rocky mountain landscape.	Wyoming, Montana, and Idaho, United States; 44°30′N 110°50′W	Natural: (vii), (viii), (ix), (x)	898,349 (2,219,870)	1978	Endangered from 1995 to 2003. Yellowstone Park is the largest and most famous megafauna location in the contiguous United States. Grizzly bears, wolves, and free-ranging herds of bison and elk live in the park. The Yellowstone Park bison herd is the oldest and largest public bison herd in the United States. Old Faithful and Grand Prismatic Spring are two of the park's most famous sites.	
Yosemite National Park	Forested valley lined by large rocks.	California, United States; 37°45′N 119°36′W	Natural: (vii), (viii)	308,283 (761,780)	1984	Yosemite is one of the largest and least fragmented habitat blocks in the Sierra Nevada. The park supports a diversity of plants and animals and has an elevation range from 2,127 to 13,114 feet (648 to 3,997 m). It contains five major vegetation zones: chaparral and oak woodland, lower montane forest, upper montane forest, subalpine zone, and alpine. Of California's 7,000 plant species, about 50% occur in the Sierra Nevada and more than 20% within Yosemite. There is suitable habitat for more than 160 rare plants in the park, with rare local geologic formations and unique soils characterizing the restricted ranges many of these plants occupy.	

== See also ==
- Lists of World Heritage Sites
- List of World Heritage Sites in the United States
