= List of World Heritage Sites in South America =

The United Nations Educational, Scientific and Cultural Organization (UNESCO) designates World Heritage Sites of outstanding universal value to cultural or natural heritage which have been nominated by signatories to the 1972 UNESCO World Heritage Convention. Cultural heritage consists of monuments (such as architectural works, monumental sculptures, or inscriptions), groups of buildings, and sites (including archaeological sites). Natural features (consisting of physical and biological formations), geological and physiographical formations (including habitats of threatened species of animals and plants), and natural sites which are important from the point of view of science, conservation or natural beauty, are defined as natural heritage.

For the purposes of this list South America is defined according to the United Nations geoscheme: Argentina, Bolivia, Brazil, Chile, Colombia, Ecuador, Paraguay, Peru, Suriname, Uruguay and Venezuela. Some territories which are not independent countries are also included. These are the French territory of French Guiana, the British territories of the Falkland Islands and Guyana, the Norwegian territories of Bouvet Island and South Georgia and the Sandwich Islands

The World Heritage Committee may also specify that a site is endangered, citing "conditions which threaten the very characteristics for which a property was inscribed on the World Heritage List."

== World Heritage Sites ==
UNESCO lists sites under ten criteria; each entry must meet at least one of the criteria. Criteria i through vi are cultural, and vii through x are natural.

* Transnational site
† In danger

Site	Image	Location	Criteria	Area ha (acre)	Year	Description	Refs
Atlantic Forest South-East Reserves	Forested mountains topped by rocks.	Paraná, São Paulo and Rio de Janeiro states, Brazil; 24°10′S 48°0′W	Natural: (vii), (ix), (x)	468,193 (1,156,930); buffer zone 1,223,557 (3,023,480)	1999	The site comprises some of the last remaining Atlantic Forests and shows a very high diversity with many rare and endemic species. As such it is of high interest both for scientists and for conservation.	
Brasília	Human sculptures and a hyperbolic shaped modern building with white ribs and glass.	Federal District, Brazil; 15°47′S 47°54′W	Cultural: (i), (iv)	—	1987	Planned and developed by Lúcio Costa and Oscar Niemeyer in 1956, Brasília was created ex nihilo in order to move the capital from Rio de Janeiro to a more central position. Together with Chandigarh in India it is the only place where Corbusier's design principles of urbanism have been applied on large scale.	
Brazilian Atlantic Islands: Fernando de Noronha and Atol das Rocas Reserves	Rocky coast interspersed by sand beaches.	Pernambuco and Rio Grande do Norte, Brazil; 3°51′29″S 32°25′30″W	Natural: (vii), (ix), (x)	42,270 (104,500); buffer zone 140,713 (347,710)	2001	As one of the few insular habitats in the South Atlantic, the site is essential as feeding ground and reproduction space for marine organisms including endangered and threatened species, most notably the hawksbill sea turtle.	
Canaima National Park	Table mountain, grassland and forest.	Bolívar, Venezuela; 5°20′N 61°30′W	Natural: (vii), (viii), (ix), (x)	3,000,000 (7,400,000)	1994	The park is characterized by table-top mountains (tepui) that cover 65% of the area and are of both geological and biological interest, providing habitat to a large number of endemic species. Angel Falls, the world's highest waterfall is included in the property.	
Cavernas do Peruaçu National Park		Minas Gerais, Brazil 15°7′19.2″S 44°19′26.4″W	Natural: (vii), (viii)	38,003 (93,910); buffer zone 100,354 (247,980)	2025		
Central Amazon Conservation Complex	Satellite image of a wide river and smaller meandering tributaries running through a light green landscape.	State of Amazonas, Brazil; 2°20′0″S 62°0′30″W	Natural: (ix), (x)	5,323,018 (13,153,460)	2000 (Note: Extended in 2003 to include the Amana Sustainable Development Reserve, the Demonstration area of the Mamirauá Sustainable Development Reserve and the Anavilhanas Ecological Station; and name change from Jaú National Park, Brazil to the present name.)	As the largest protected area in the Amazon basin, the site is notable for its high biodiversity, range of habitats such as várzea and igapó forests and number of endangered species. It has been recognized by various conservation agencies as a high priority region. (Note: It is a Centre of Plant Diversity, an Endemic Bird Area of the World and a Global 200 ecoregion.)	
Central Suriname Nature Reserve	Densely wooded mountain landscape.	Sipaliwini District, Suriname; 4°0′N 56°30′W	Natural: (ix), (x)	1,600,000 (4,000,000)	2000	The site comprises a large undisturbed tract of tropical forest with high biodiversity, many endemic and threatened species. Due to topography and the range of soil conditions, it has various ecoregions.	
Cerrado Protected Areas: Chapada dos Veadeiros and Emas National Parks	Rocky mountain landscape and valley.	Central Brazil Plateau, State of Goiás, Brazil; 14°0′20″S 47°41′5″W	Natural: (ix), (x)	367,356 (907,760)	2001	The two parks are characteristic of the cerrado, one of the world's oldest tropical ecosystems and an important refuge for species in times of climate change.	
Chan Chan Archaeological Zone^{†}	Chan Chan	La Libertad, Peru; 8°6′S 79°5′W	Cultural: (i), (iii)	600 (1,500)	1986	The city of Chan Chan served as the capital of the Chimú culture. The Chimú kingdom developed along the coast of northern Peru. Chan Chan is divided into nine walled units indicating political and social division. The Chimú were conquered by the Inca in 1470. The site was listed to the List of World Heritage in Danger when it was first inscribed, as the adobe constructions are easily damaged by heavy rain and erosion.	
Chankillo Archaeoastronomical Complex		Ancash, Peru 9°33′24″S 78°14′09″W	Cultural: (i), (iv)	4,480 (11,100); buffer zone 43,990 (108,700)	2021		
Chavín (Archaeological Site)	Stone ruins and stairs.	Huari Province, Ancash, Peru; 9°35′34″S 77°10′42″W	Cultural: (iii)	—	1985	The Chavín culture developed in the Andean highlands between 1500 and 300 BC, and the site now known as Chavín de Huantar served as the center. The site consists of a complex of terraces and squares cut from rock. It is believed the Chavín were primarily a religious-based society whose influence resulted from their culture, rather than aggressive expansion.	
Churches of Chiloé	Wooden church with a single central tower covered in shingles.	Chiloé Province, Los Lagos Region, Chile; 42°30′0″S 73°46′0″W	Cultural: (ii), (iii)	—	2000	The churches are the most prominent example of Chilota wooden architecture fusing European and indigenous traditions. They are a result of 17th and 18th century Jesuit missions.	
Chiribiquete National Park– "The Maloca of the Jaguar"	A tepui within the Chiribiquete National Park.	Caquetá and Guaviare Departments, Colombia; 0°31′31″N 72°47′50″W	Mixed: (iii), (ix), (x)	2,782,354 (6,875,350); buffer zone 3,989,682.82 (9,858,721.0)	2018	Located in the north-west Colombian Amazon, Chiribiquete National Park is the largest protected area in the country. One of the defining features of the park is the presence of tepuis (the Native American word for table-top mountains), sheer-sided sandstone plateaux that dominate the forest. Over 75,000 paintings, spanning more than 20,000 years to the present, are to be seen on the walls of the 60 rock shelters around the bases of the tepuis. Believed to be linked to the worship of the jaguar, a symbol of power and fertility, these paintings depict hunting scenes, battles, dances and ceremonies. The indigenous communities, which are not directly present on the site, consider the region sacred.	
City of Cuzco	Large stone church with two massive towers and three entrances on the main facade.	Cuzco, Peru; 13°31′20″S 71°59′0″W	Cultural: (iii), (iv)	—	1983	Cuzco was developed by the Inca king Pachacutec, who ruled the Kingdom of Cuzco as it expanded to become the Inca Empire in the 15th century. It became the most important city of the Inca Empire, divided into distinct areas for religious and administrative use, and surrounded by an organized system of agriculture, artisan, and industrial uses. After the Spanish conquered the empire in the 16th century, they built Baroque churches and buildings over the Inca ruins.	
City of Potosí^{†}	City of small simple houses in front of a large conical red mountain.	Potosí, Potosí Department, Bolivia; 19°35′1″S 65°45′11″W	Cultural: (ii), (iv), (vi)	130 (320)	1987	Following the discovery of the New World's largest silver reserves in the mid-16th century, Potosí was regarded as the world's largest industrial complex of the time. The site contains industrial facilities of the Cerro Rico, colonial public and residential architecture.	
City of Quito	A square with a large white church with one tower and several cuppolas.	Quito, Quito Canton, Pichincha Province, Ecuador; 0°0′14″N 78°30′0″W	Cultural: (ii), (iv)	320 (790)	1978	Built in Spanish colonial style, the former capital of the Royal Audiencia of Quito.The Historic Center of Quito is the most original and best preserved historic center of its kind in Latin America.	
Ciudad Universitaria de Caracas	Abstract sculpture in front of a 20th-century tall building partially painted red.	Municipality of Libertador, Caracas, Venezuela; 10°29′27″N 66°53′26″W	Cultural: (i), (iv)	—	2000	Designed by Carlos Raúl Villanueva, the university campus is considered a masterpiece of early 20th century architecture and urban planning. It derives from colonial traditions, providing an airy solution well suited to the tropical climate.	
Coffee Cultural Landscape of Colombia	Coffee plantations in Quinchía.	Caldas, Quindío and Risaralda Departments,Colombia; 5°28′N 75°41′W	Cultural: (v), (vi)	141,120 (348,700); buffer zone 207,000 (510,000)	2011	The 100-year-old coffee cultivation is emblematic of Colombian culture and has impacted cultural and social traditions in music, architecture, cuisine, education and others.	
Coro and its Port^{†}	A street with single-storied colorful houses.	Falcón, Venezuela; 11°24′N 69°41′W	Cultural: (iv), (v)	107 (260); buffer zone 107 (260)	1993	Founded in 1527, Coro was one of the earliest colonial towns in the Americas. Its earthen constructions are the only extant example of fusion of Caribbean with Spanish Mudéjar and Dutch architecture. The site has been listed as endangered since 2005 following damage due to heavy rain and the construction of various structures in the buffer zone.	
Cueva de las Manos, Río Pinturas	Red and white handprints on a rock face.	Santa Cruz Province, Argentina; 47°9′0″S 70°40′0″W	Cultural: (iii)	—	1999	Named for the paintings of hands, the cave contains rock art from between 13,000 and 9,500 years ago that bear witness to the earliest human inhabitants in South America.	
Discovery Coast Atlantic Forest Reserves	Small waterfall sided by two large rocks.	Atlantic Coast, Bahia and Espírito Santo states, Brazil; 16°30′S 39°15′W	Natural: (ix), (x)	111,930 (276,600)	1999	The site comprises some of the last remaining Atlantic Forests and shows a very high diversity with many rare and endemic species. As such it is of high interest both for scientists and for conservation.	
ESMA Museum and Site of Memory – Former Clandestine Centre of Detention, Torture and Extermination		Buenos Aires, Argentina 34°32′18.24″S 58°27′48.96″W	Cultural: (vi)	0.907 (2.24); buffer zone 16.77 (41.4)	2023		
Fray Bentos Cultural-Industrial Landscape	Aisle between sets of industrial machinery on a factory floor	Río Negro Department, Uruguay; 33°07′04″S 58°19′54″W	Cultural: (ii), (iv)	274 (680); buffer zone 2,128 (5,260)	2015		
Fuerte de Samaipata	Large rock with symbols cut into it and foundations of buildings.	Florida Province, Santa Cruz Department, Bolivia; 18°10′S 63°49′W	Cultural: (ii), (iii)	—	1998	Samaipata consists of remains of a town, and more prominently a large sculpted rock (14th–16th centuries) thought to have been the ceremonial centre of a pre-Hispanic culture.	
Galápagos Islands	Landscape with little vegetation, rocks and an isthmus.	Galápagos Province, Ecuador; 0°40′S 90°30′W	Natural: (vii), (viii), (ix), (x)	14,066,514 (34,759,110)	1978	This remote archipelago of volcanic islands is famed for the high degree of endemism and is associated with Charles Darwin whose observations here contributed to the inception of Darwin's theory of evolution by natural selection. The site had been listed as endangered for various reasons (Note: Reasons include insufficient prevention of possibilities for the introduction of alien species, insufficient resource allocation for conservation agencies and park management, presence of a large number of illegal immigrants, rapid uncontrolled growth of tourism, fishing over-capacity and sports fishing.) 2007–2010.	
Historical Centre of the City of Arequipa	Facade of a very large white church with two tall towers.	Arequipa, Peru; 16°24′0″S 71°32′0″W	Cultural: (i), (iv)	167 (410); buffer zone 165 (410)	2000	Arequipa is built primarily on top of sillar, a white volcanic rock, the product of nearby El Misti volcano. The architecture of the city is known for its combination of traditional indigenous styles with the new techniques of the European colonial settlers.	
Historic Centre of Salvador de Bahia	Large three-storied buildings with facades painted in bright colors: light blue and yellow.	Bahia state, Brazil; 12°58′0″S 38°30′0″W	Cultural: (iv), (vi)	—	1985	The colonial old town of the first Brazilian capital and town of the first slave market in the New World, has preserved a large number of brightly colored Renaissance houses decorated with stucco work from the 16th to 18th centuries.	
Historic Centre of Santa Ana de los Ríos de Cuenca	Roofs and towers of a small white church and a larger brown brick church with three large white-blue cuppolas.	Azuay Province, Ecuador; 2°53′0″S 78°59′0″W	Cultural: (ii), (iv), (v)	200 (490)	1999	Founded in 1557 on an orthogonal town plan, the townscape of Cuenca is an expression of the fusion of different societies and cultures and a showcase of Renaissance urban design in Latin America.	
Historic Centre of Lima	Large square with a fountain and four storied yellow buildings with large glassed balconies.	Lima Province, Peru; 12°3′5″S 77°2′35″W	Cultural: (iv)	200 (490)	1988 (Note: Extended in 1991 to include "the area protected by national legislation.")	Lima was founded by Francisco Pizarro in 1535 as La Ciudad de los Reyes (City of the Kings). Until the middle of the 18th century, it was the most important city in Spanish South America. The architecture and decoration combine the style of both the local population and Europe, such as in the Monastery of San Francisco, which was the site's original listing in 1988, before it was extended in 1991.	
Historic Centre of Santa Cruz de Mompox	Facade of a stone church with tower painted in white and yellow.	Bolívar Department, Colombia; 9°14′0″N 74°26′0″W	Cultural: (iv), (v)	458 (1,130); buffer zone 632 (1,560)	1995	Mompox, founded in 1540 on a major river has preserved in its historic centre the colonial past with many buildings still serving their original function.	
Historic Centre of São Luís	A cobblestone street of old single-storied brightly colored houses.	Maranhão state, Brazil; 2°30′51″S 44°18′9″W	Cultural: (iii), (iv), (v)	—	1997	São Luís has preserved the complete rectangular town plan and a large number of historical buildings making it a prime example of a Portuguese colonial town.	
Historic Centre of the Town of Diamantina	Old church, cobble stone streets and two-storied houses with white facades.	Minas Gerais, Brazil; 18°40′0″S 43°36′0″W	Cultural: (ii), (iv)	29 (72)	1999	A well-preserved example of Baroque architecture, this 18th-century colonial town was founded in an inhospitable environment of rocky mountains and became a center of diamond mining in the 18th and 19th centuries.	
Historic Centre of the Town of Goiás	Facade of a two-storied stone church, largely painted white/beige with red/brownish window frames.	Goiás, Brazil; 15°56′0″S 50°8′0″W	Cultural: (ii), (iv)	40 (99); buffer zone 44 (110)	2001	Founded in 1727 by the bandeirante explorer Bartolomeu Bueno da Silva, Goiás has preserved much of its colonial heritage and is an example of a European settlement in the interior of South America.	
Historic Centre of the Town of Olinda	White stone church with red tile roof near the sea.	Pernambuco, Brazil; 8°0′48″S 34°50′42″W	Cultural: (ii), (iv)	120 (300); buffer zone 920 (2,300)	1982	Founded in 1537 the town prospered as a centre of sugar-cane production. Following looting by the Dutch in the 17th century, the historic centre dates largely to the 18th century with a harmonious combination of buildings, gardens, churches, convents and chapels.	
Historic City of Sucre	View through an arch onto a paved square with a fountain in the center and a white church on the far side	Oropeza Province, Chuquisaca Department, Bolivia; 19°2′35″S 65°15′33″W	Cultural: (iv)	114 (280)	1991	Founded by the Spanish in 1538, Sucre has retained many of its 16th century religious buildings showing the fusion of local and European architectural styles.	
Historic Inner City of Paramaribo^{†}	Street with two storied wooden houses. Many of the houses have a balcony along the street side.	Paramaribo District, Suriname; 5°49′34″N 55°9′0″W	Cultural: (ii), (iv)	30 (74); buffer zone 60 (150)	2002	Founded as a Dutch colonial town in the 17th century, Paramaribo has preserved its unique street plan with buildings showing the gradual influence of Dutch architectural traditions.	
Historic Quarter of the City of Colonia del Sacramento	Stone wall with gate and draw bridge.	Colonia Department, Uruguay; 34°28′4″S 57°51′12″W	Cultural: (iv)	16 (40)	1995	Founded in 1680 by the Portuguese, the town changed hands between Spanish and Portuguese multiple times during the 17th and 18th centuries and was finally lost to the Spanish. Its well-preserved townscape bears testimony to the fusion of Spanish and Portuguese colonial styles.	
Historic Quarter of the Seaport City of Valparaíso	Cityscape with some colorful houses on a slope.	Valparaíso Province, Chile; 33°2′26″S 71°37′41″W	Cultural: (iii)	23 (57); buffer zone 45 (110)	2003	In the late 19th century Valparaíso prospered as a stopover point for ships travelling between the Atlantic and Pacific via the Straits of Magellan. Its historic quarter set on steep hillsides has bears testimony to this early phase of globalization.	
Historic Sanctuary of Machu Picchu	Ruins of a city in the mountains.	Cuzco, Peru; 13°7′0″S 72°35′0″W	Mixed: (i) (iii), (vii), (ix)	32,592 (80,540)	1983	At 2,340 metres (7,680 ft) above sea level, the site of Machu Picchu was constructed as an expansive mountain estate around the middle of the 15th century, and abandoned approximately 100 years later. It includes walls, terraces, and buildings constructed from rock. The city was home to about 1,200 people, mostly priests, women, and children. It was left abandoned prior to the Spanish arrival in Cuzco most likely due to smallpox.	
Historic Town of Ouro Preto	Two-storied white buildings with red roof tiles lining a square. At the end of the square there is a prominent building with a clock tower.	Minas Gerais, Brazil; 20°23′20″S 43°30′20″W	Cultural: (i), (iii)	—	1980	The prosperity of the town as the center of the Brazilian gold rush in the 18th century is reflected in a large number of preserved churches, bridges and fountains many of them designed by the Baroque sculptor Aleijadinho.	
Huascarán National Park	High, snow-capped rocky mountain.	Ancash, Peru; 9°20′S 77°24′W	Natural: (vii), (viii)	340,000 (840,000)	1985	Huascarán National Park is located in the Cordillera Blanca mountain range of the Andes. It surrounds Huascarán, the tallest peak in Peru. The physical environment includes glaciers, ravines, and lakes, while the park is home to several regional animal species.	
Humberstone and Santa Laura Saltpeter Works	Industrial structure in a desert setting.	Tarapacá, Chile; 20°12′30″S 69°47′40″W	Cultural: (ii), (iii), (iv)	—	2005	Situated in the Atacama Desert, the two saltpeter works are representative of the saltpeter industry that flourished in northern Chile in the 19th and early 20th century and brought together people from different parts of South America and Europe creating a unique culture with its own language and customs. The site was listed as endangered from 2005 to 2019 due to damage, vandalism, looting and the general fragile nature of the structures as a result of a 40 years' lack of maintenance.	
Iguaçu National Park	A large horseshoe shaped waterfall.	Paraná, Brazil; 25°41′S 54°26′W	Natural: (vii), (x)	170,086 (420,290)	1986	Together with Iguazú National Park on the Argentinian side, the park protects Iguazu Falls, one of the world's largest waterfalls, and is home to many rare and endangered species such as giant anteater or the giant otter. The site had been listed as endangered 1999–2001 due to an illegally opened road through the park, dams on the Iguazu River and helicopter flights.	
Iguazú National Park	A large waterfall in a densely vegetated area.	Misiones Province, Mesopotamia; Argentina; 25°31′5″S 54°8′0″W	Natural: (vii), (x)	55,000 (140,000)	1984	Together with Iguaçu National Park on the Brazilian side, the park protects Iguazu Falls, one of the world's largest waterfalls. Its subtropical rainforest is home to more than 2000 species of vascular plants and large mammals such as tapirs, giant anteaters, howler monkeys, ocelots and jaguars.	
Ischigualasto / Talampaya Natural Parks	A red and vertical rock face.	San Juan and La Rioja Province; Argentina; 30°0′S 68°0′W	Natural: (viii)	275,369 (680,450)	2000	As the most complete continental fossil site of the Triassic period (245–208 million years ago), the propertie's remains of mammals, dinosaurs and plants reveal the evolution of vertebrates.	
Jesuit Block and Estancias of Córdoba	Stone church or monastery complex beyond a lake.	Córdoba; Argentina; 31°25′14″S 64°11′28″W	Cultural: (ii), (iv)	—	2000	Founded in the early 17th century, this Jesuit reduction has preserved the university, church, residences and five farming estates (estancias), illustrating the missionary and economic activities carried out by the Jesuits over a period of 150 years in the New World.	
Jesuit Missions of La Santísima Trinidad de Paraná and Jesús de Tavarangue	Ruins of stone buildings.	Paraguay; 27°8′S 55°42′W	Cultural: (iv)	—	1993	The ruins of these Jesuit reductions bear testimony to the missionary, social and economical activities of the Jesuits in the Rio de la Plata Basin in the 17th and 18th centuries.	
Jesuit Missions of Chiquitos	A wooden bell-tower and a church in three-quarter view. The bell-tower consists of a roof-covered platform supported by four columns with twisted fluting. Clocks are attached to the platform and a spiral staircase leads to it. The facade of the church is white and decorated with orange paintings. The church roof is rather large.	Santa Cruz Department, Bolivia; 16°0′S 60°30′W	Cultural: (iv), (v)	—	1990	Six settlements in the Chiquitania have been preserved as living heritage of their past as Jesuit reductions in the 17th and 18th centuries. Their churches largely restored in the late 20th century are a fusion of indigenous and European architectural traditions.	
Jesuit Missions of the Guaranis: San Ignacio Miní, Santa Ana, Nuestra Señora de Loreto and Santa María Mayor (Argentina), Ruins of São Miguel das Missões (Brazil)	Ruins of a stone church facade and tower.	Misiones Province, Argentina* and Rio Grande do Sul, Brazil* 28°32′36″S 54°15′57″W	Cultural: (iv)	—	1983 (Note: Extended in 1984 to include the four Argentinian missions making it a trans-border site; and name change from The Ruins of São Miguel das Missões to the present name.)	Each of the five ruined Jesuit missions founded amidst a tropical forest in the land of the Guaraní people in the 17th and 18th centuries is characterized by a specific design.	
Jodensavanne Archaeological Site: Jodensavanne Settlement and Cassipora Creek Cemetery		Para District, Suriname 5°25′52″N 54°58′57.6″W	Cultural: (iii)	25 (62); buffer zone 19 (47)	2023		
Lençóis Maranhenses National Park		Maranhão, Brazil 02°32′S 43°07′W	Natural: (vii), (viii)	156,562 (386,870); buffer zone 268,231 (662,810)	2024		
Lines and Geoglyphs of Nazca and Pampas de Jumana	Black and white line engraving of a monkey with a curled tail.	Nazca, Peru; 14°43′33″S 75°8′55″W	Cultural: (i), (iii), (iv)	—	1994	The large designs in the Nazca Desert are believed to have been created by the Nazca culture between 400 and 650 AD. They were created by scratching lines into the ground surface. Designs include animals such as a monkey and hummingbird, plants, and geographic shapes on a large scale. It is believed that they served a ritualistic purpose.	
Los Alerces National Park		Chubut Province, Argentina; 42°51′10.08″S 71°52′22.085″W	Natural: (vii), (x)	188,379 (465,490); buffer zone 207,313 (512,280)	2017		
Los Glaciares National Park	A glacier calving into the sea or a lake.	Santa Cruz Province, Argentina; 50°0′0″S 73°14′58″W	Natural: (vii), (viii)	445,900 (1,102,000)	1981	This National Park is of exceptional beauty comprising high peaks, glacial lakes and glaciers, some of which are advancing.	
Los Katíos National Park	Giant anteater in Los Katíos	Antioquia and Chocó Departments, Colombia; 7°40′N 77°0′W	Natural: (ix), (x)	72,000 (180,000)	1994	Situated at the Darién Gap, Los Katíos comprises hills, forests and humid plains that are notable for their exceptional bio-diversity including many endangered animal species and endemic plants. The site was listed as endangered from 2009 to 2015 due to deforestation, illegal fishing and hunting, but has now been removed from the endangered sites list.	
Malpelo Fauna and Flora Sanctuary	Irregularly shaped rock with smooth surfaces in the sea.	Cauca Department, Colombia; 3°58′N 81°37′W	Natural: (vii), (ix)	857,500 (2,119,000)	2006		
Manú National Park	Trees on yellow soil near a river.	Madre de Dios, Peru; 12°15′S 71°45′W	Natural: (ix), (x)	1,716,295 (4,241,060)	1987 (Note: Minor modification of boundaries in 2009 to include all of the National Park in the World Heritage Site.)	The park spreads from 150 metres (490 ft) to 4,200 metres (13,800 ft) above sea-level. Manú is home to 1,000 bird species, over 200 species of mammals (100 of which are bats), and over 15,000 species of flowering plants. Prior to being recognized as a World Heritage Site, it was designated as a biosphere reserve in 1977.	
National Archeological Park of Tierradentro	Interior of a cave with wall paintings of geometrical figures in red, black and white.	Inza, Cauca Department, Colombia; 2°35′0″N 76°2′0″W	Cultural: (iii)	—	1995		
Noel Kempff Mercado National Park	Large waterfall among rocks covered with vegetation.	Santa Cruz Department, Bolivia; 14°16′S 60°52′W	Natural: (ix), (x)	1,523,446 (3,764,520)	2000		
Pampulha Modern Ensemble		Belo Horizonte, Brazil; 19°51′7″S 43°58′25″W	Cultural: (i), (ii), (iv)	154 (380); buffer zone 1,418 (3,500)	2016		
Pantanal Conservation Area	Plain with forests, grassland, rivers and many lakes.	Mato Grosso do Sul and Mato Grosso, Brazil; 17°43′S 57°23′W	Natural: (vii), (ix), (x)	187,818 (464,110)	2000		
Paraty and Ilha Grande - Culture and Biodiversity	Plain with old buildings, forests, mountains and palm trees.	Rio de Janeiro; Brazil; 23°13′21″S 44°42′50″W	Mixed: (v)(x)	204,634 (505,660)	2019	Located between the Serra da Bocaina mountain range and the Atlantic Ocean, this cultural landscape includes the historic centre of Paraty, one of Brazil's best-preserved coastal towns, as well as four protected natural areas of the Brazilian Atlantic Forest, one of the world's five key biodiversity hotspots. Paraty is home to an impressive diversity of species, some of which are threatened, such as the jaguar (Panthera onca), the white-lipped peccary (Tayassu pecari) and several primate species, including the woolly spider monkey (Brachyteles arachnoides), which are emblematic of the site. In the late 17th century, Paraty was the end-point of the Caminho do Ouro (Gold Route), along which gold was shipped to Europe. Its port also served as an entry point for tools and African slaves, sent to work in the mines. A defence system was built to protect the wealth of the port and the town. The historic centre of Paraty has retained its 18th century plan and much of its colonial architecture dating from the 18th and early 19th centuries.	
Península Valdés	A group of sea lions including male, female and young animals on a sandy beach.	Viedma Department; Argentina; 42°30′S 64°0′W	Natural: (x)	360,000 (890,000)	1999		
Port, Fortresses and Group of Monuments, Cartagena	Facade of a yellow stone church with two towers. Above the main entrance there is a human sculpture and higher up a clock.	Bolívar Department, Colombia; 10°25′0″N 75°32′0″W	Cultural: (iv), (vi)	—	1984		
Quebrada de Humahuaca	Mountains with little vegetation cover.	Jujuy Province; Argentina; 23°12′0″S 65°20′56″W	Cultural: (ii), (iv), (v)	172,116 (425,310); buffer zone 369,649 (913,420)	2003		
Qhapaq Ñan, Andean Road System	Inca road system near Macchu Picchu, Peru.	Argentina* Bolivia* Chile* Colombia* Ecuador* Peru*	Cultural: (ii), (iii), (iv), (vi)	300,000,000 (740,000,000)	2014	An extensive Inca communication, trade and defense network of roads covering 30,000 km (19,000 mi) and built over several centuries, this extraordinary network through one of the world's most extreme geographical terrains linked the snow-capped peaks of the Andes—at an altitude of more than 6,000 m (20,000 ft)—to the coast, running through hot rainforests, fertile valleys and absolute deserts.	
Rio Abiseo National Park		San Martín, Peru; 7°45′S 77°15′W	Mixed: (iii), (vii), (ix), (x)	274,520 (678,400)	1990 (Note: In 1992 inscription under cultural criteria (iii) in addition to original inscription as natural site based on criteria (vii), (ix), (x).)	The park was created in 1983 in order to protect the region's rainforest habitat. The park is home to many endemic species such as the yellow-tailed woolly monkey, which was thought to be extinct. The site is also listed under cultural criteria, as over 30 Pre-Columbian sites have been discovered since 1985.	
Rio de Janeiro: Carioca Landscapes Between the Mountain and the Sea	Human sculptures and a hyperbolic shaped modern building with white ribs and glass.	Rio de Janeiro, Brazil; 24°50′S 43°11′W	Cultural: (vi)	7,249 (17,910); buffer zone 8,621 (21,300)	2012	The listed site consists of an exceptional urban setting rather than built heritage. It encompasses the key natural elements that have shaped and inspired the development of the city: from the highest points of the Tijuca National Park's mountains down to the sea. They also include the Botanical Gardens, established in 1808, Corcovado Mountain with its celebrated statue of Christ and the hills around Guanabara Bay, including the extensive designed landscapes along Copacabana Bay which have contributed to the outdoor living culture of this spectacular city. Rio de Janeiro is also recognized for the artistic inspiration it has provided to musicians, landscapers and urbanists.	
Sacred City of Caral-Supe	Ruins of two pyramids in a desert landscape.	Lima, Peru; 10°53′30″S 77°31′17″W	Cultural: (ii), (iii), (iv)	626 (1,550); buffer zone 14,620 (36,100)	2009	The archaeological site belonged to the Norte Chico civilization that inhabited the area during the Late Archaic period. Caral is one of 18 complex urban settlements in the region and features many monuments and pyramids. Caral is the earliest known American settlement. A quipu recovered from the site demonstrates its influence on later Andean cultures.	
San Agustín Archaeological Park	Several stone figures carrying a large flat stone on their heads.	San Augustin and San José de Isnos, Huila Department, Colombia; 1°55′0″N 76°14′0″W	Cultural: (iii)	—	1995		
Sanctuary of Bom Jesus do Congonhas	Stairs leading to a white stone church with two towers. Sculptures are placed on walls in front of the church.	Congonhas, Minas Gerais, Brazil; 20°29′59″S 43°51′28″W	Cultural: (i), (iv)	—	1985		
Sangay National Park	Forested mountain landscape.	Morona Santiago, Chimborazo and Tungurahua Provinces, Ecuador; 1°50′S 78°20′W	Natural: (vii), (viii), (ix), (x)	271,925 (671,940)	1983	Endangered 1992–2005	
São Francisco Square in the Town of São Cristóvão	Square of São Francisco	São Cristóvão, Sergipe, Brazil; 11°0′58″S 37°12′36″W	Cultural: (ii), (iv)	3.00 (7.4); buffer zone 2,500 (6,200)	2010		
Serra da Capivara National Park	Rock painting in red of a four legged animal, a smaller four legged animal and a human figure.	Piauí, Brazil; 8°25′0″S 42°20′0″W	Cultural: (iii)	—	1991		
Settlement and Artificial Mummification of the Chinchorro Culture in the Arica and Parinacota Region		Arica y Parinacota, Chile 18°28′53″S 70°19′18″W	Cultural: (iii), (v)	—	2021		
Sewell Mining Town	Large three-storied houses on a slope painted in light blue.	Machalí, Cachapoal Province, O'Higgins Region Chile; 34°5′4″S 70°22′58″W	Cultural: (ii)	17 (42); buffer zone 33 (82)	2006		
Sítio Roberto Burle Marx		Rio de Janeiro, Brazil 23°1′20.56″S 43°32′46.4″W	Cultural: (ii), (iv)	41 (100); buffer zone 575 (1,420)	2021		
Tiahuanacu: Spiritual and Political Centre of the Tiahuanacu Culture	Simple stone gate decorated with a flat repeating checkered pattern of small figures and a larger figure in relief at the center top.	Ingavi Province, La Paz Department, Bolivia; 16°33′30″S 68°40′40″W	Cultural: (iii), (iv)	—	2000		
The Architectural Work of Le Corbusier, an Outstanding Contribution to the Modern Movement		Argentina* Belgium* France* Germany* India* Japan* Switzerland* 34°54′40.83″S 57°56′30.57″W	Cultural: (i)(ii)(vi)	—	2016		
The work of engineer Eladio Dieste: Church of Atlántida		Estación Atlántida, Atlántida, Canelones Department Uruguay 34°44′38.11″S 55°45′59.04″W	Cultural: (iv)	0.56 (1.4); buffer zone 69.5 (172)	2021		
Valongo Wharf Archaeological Site		Rio de Janeiro, Brazil; 22°53′49.6″S 43°11′14.62″W	Cultural: (vi)	0.39 (0.96); buffer zone 42 (100)	2017		

== Tentative list ==
In addition to sites inscribed on the World Heritage List, member states can maintain a list of tentative sites that they may consider for nomination. Nominations for the World Heritage List are only accepted if the site was previously listed on the tentative list.

Tentative sites
Site	Image	Location	Year listed	UNESCO criteria	Description

== See also ==
- Lists of World Heritage Sites

== See also ==
- List of World Heritage Sites in the Caribbean
- List of World Heritage Sites in Central America
