= Sanctuary of Atotonilco =

- Santuario de Dios y de la Patria (Spanish)
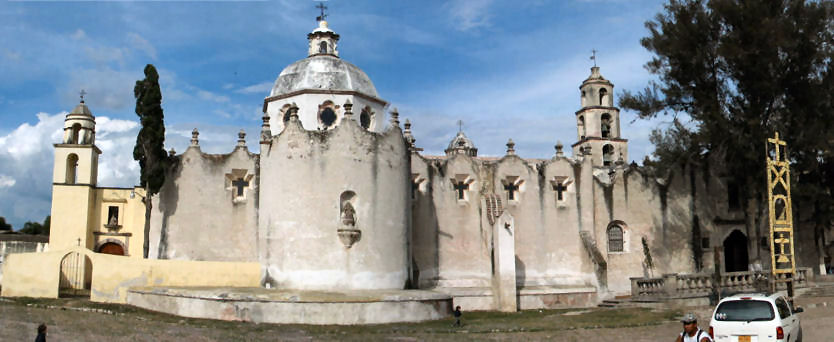
- Exterior of the Santuario de Jesús Nazareno de Atotonilco

- Location within Mexico
- 21°0′17.96″N 100°47′40.43″W
- Location: Near San Miguel de Allende, Guanajuato, Mexico

History
- Built: 18th century

Site notes
- Architectural style: Mexican Baroque
- Visitors: 5000 per week

UNESCO World Heritage Site
- Official name: Protective town of San Miguel de Allende and Sanctuary of Jesús Nazareno de Atotonilco
- Type: Cultural
- Criteria: ii, iv
- Designated: 2008 (32nd session)
- Reference no.: 1274
- Region: Latin America and the Caribbean

The Sanctuary of Atotonilco (Spanish: Santuario de Jesús Nazareno de Atotonilco [atotoˈnilko]) is a church complex and part of a World Heritage Site, designated along with nearby San Miguel de Allende, Guanajuato, Mexico. The complex was built in the 18th century by Father Luis Felipe Neri de Alfaro, who, according to tradition, was called upon by a vision of Jesus with a crown of thorns on his head with blood on his face and carrying a cross. The main feature of the complex is the rich Mexican Baroque mural work that adorns the main nave and chapels. This was chiefly the work of Antonio Martínez de Pocasangre over a period of thirty years. The mural work has led the complex to be dubbed the "Sistine Chapel of Mexico." The complex remains a place of worship and penance to this day, attracting as many as 5,000 visitors every week.

== Description ==
The Sanctuary, officially called the Santuario de Dios y de la Patria ('Sanctuary of God and Country'), but is better known as the Sanctuary of Jesús Nazareno de Atotonilco. It is located in the small, rural community of Atotonilco, which had a population in 2005 of 597. Today, this community is formally known as the Santuario de Atotonilco and is part of a World Heritage Site (2008) along with the historic center of San Miguel de Allende.

Atotonilco is located fourteen km outside the town of San Miguel de Allende in an area that is a combination of dry grassland and desert studded with thistles, sweet acacia and mesquite trees. The appearance of the landscape has been compared to that of Jerusalem, which gives believers a connection to the Holy Land. The area also has a large number of thermal and fresh water springs. When the sanctuary was built, there were 27 fresh water springs to support gardens around the complex. Today, thermal waters still rise up from the ground only one km from the sanctuary, and another spring at the community entrance has been covered by an artificial cave and is used as a spa called Balneario La Gruta.

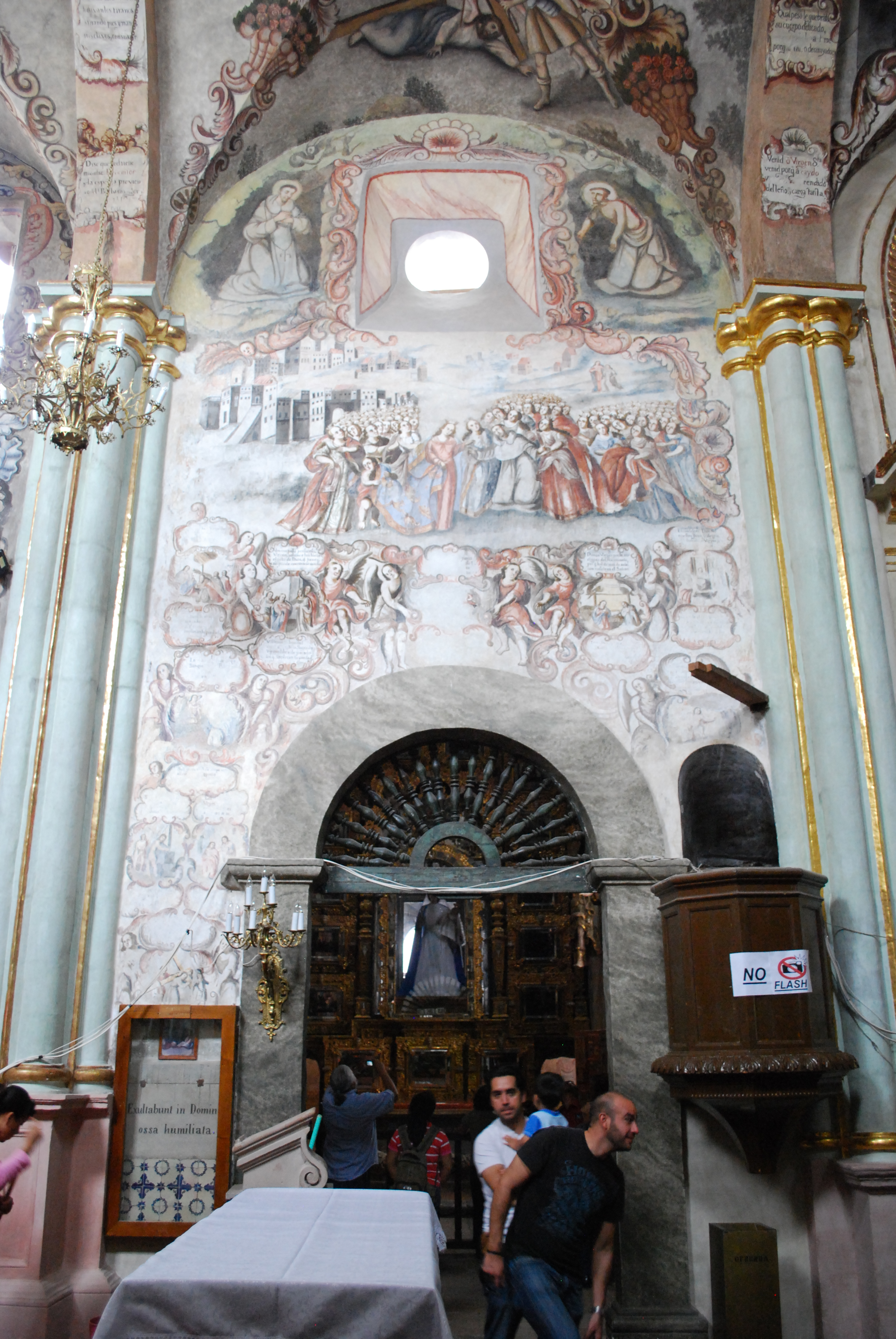
Doorway to chapel by main altar

== Architecture ==
On the outside the church complex is very plain with high walls that give it a fortress appearance. The outer walls are about ten meters high; the cupolas reach twelve meters and the clock tower is about twenty meters high. The main entrance is also simple under a "mixtilineo" arch that faces east, towards Jerusalem, giving the entire complex an east-west orientation. To the south along the main facade is the Casa de Ejercicios and the clock tower. To the north is Santa Escuela de Cristo. In front of the main facade is a narrow atrium, which was once used as a cemetery. Today, it is shaded by trees and surrounded by a small fence. The main church is a single nave without a cupola, lined on the north and south flanks by chapels and chambers. On the north side of the nave, there are the new sacristy, the Rosary Chapel, the chambers of Father Neri, the Belen Chapel/Baptistery and the Reliquary Room. On the south side, there are the Santisimo Chapel, the Soledad Chapel, the Loreto Chapel with its back chamber, the Gloria Escondida Chamber and the Santo Sepulcro Chapel with the Calvario Chapel behind it.

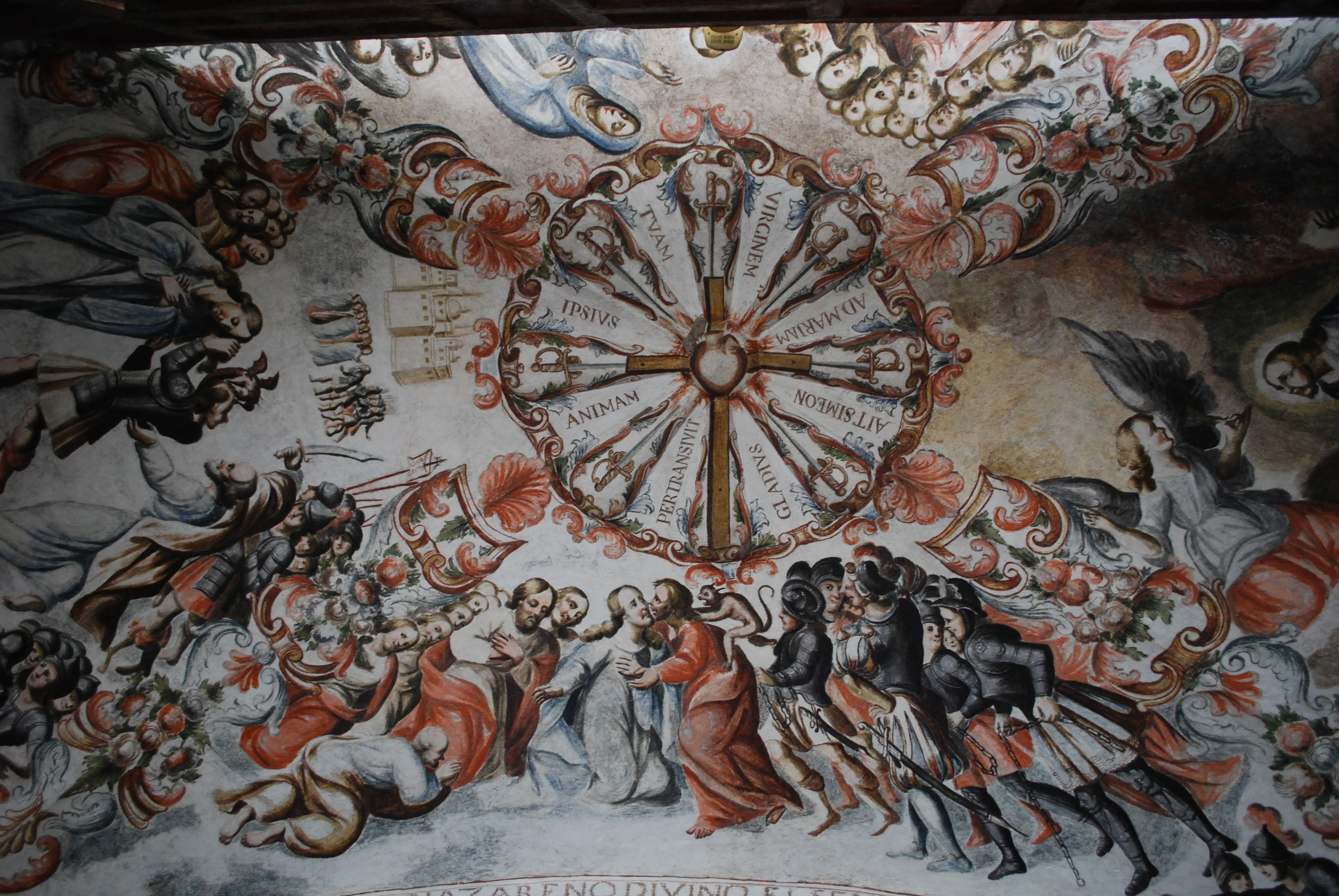
Ceiling section in the main nave

=== Interior ===
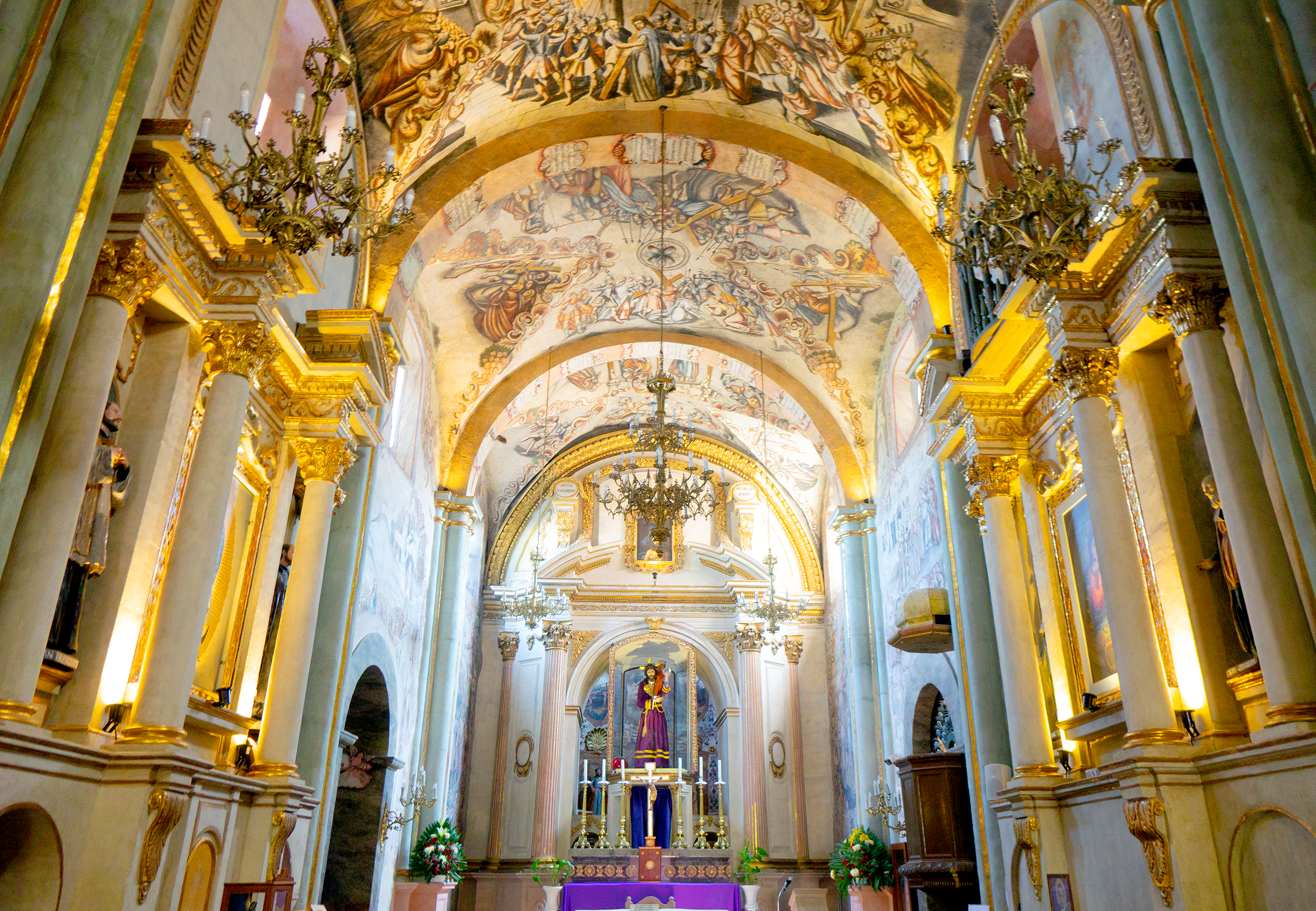
The altar area

The walls and ceilings of the interior are nearly entirely covered in mural work, sculpture, inscriptions and oil paintings in a style called Mexican folk Baroque, although indigenous influence can be seen. The only exception to this are the Neoclassical altars which were installed later. Most of the mural work was done by Antonio Martínez de Pocasangre with some done by José María Barajas over a period of thirty years with almost no free space left among the numerous images. The style of the painting imitates Flemish painting which was known through Belgian prints that the Spanish brought over from Europe. This mural work has led the complex to be called the "Sistine Chapel of America" or the "Sistine Chapel of Mexico."

The story of Jesus's ministry and death according to the Gospels is told along the main nave of the church, especially along the ceiling. At the entrance area, there are images related to the Last Judgment. In the highest part, Jesus appears crowned and with a cape carrying a cross, and blessing certain chosen people with his right hand. On the left side, are the "damned", tied up, with their faces showing their agony, large ears and horns. The entrance is divided by a wood screen to block the light with two doors in front and one door on each side. The screen is made of square blocks, each one painted with allegories, Biblical passages and an image of saints.

As the visitor moves along the nave towards the main altar, the ceiling is divided into sections by arches. These arches contain verses written by Father Neri which relate to the scene painted on each vault. The images begin with the upper choir with a scene containing Jesus with the Mary who receives a blessing. Another scene has Jesus praying in Gethsemane, receiving comfort from an angel. Another scene has Judas Iscariot with a devil on his back, followed by soldiers, Judas betrays Jesus with a kiss. In the fourth scene, Peter attacks Malchus with a sword, cutting off an ear, and then Jesus replaces the ear. The north wall features the Baptism of Jesus in the Jordan River, accompanied by John the Baptist.

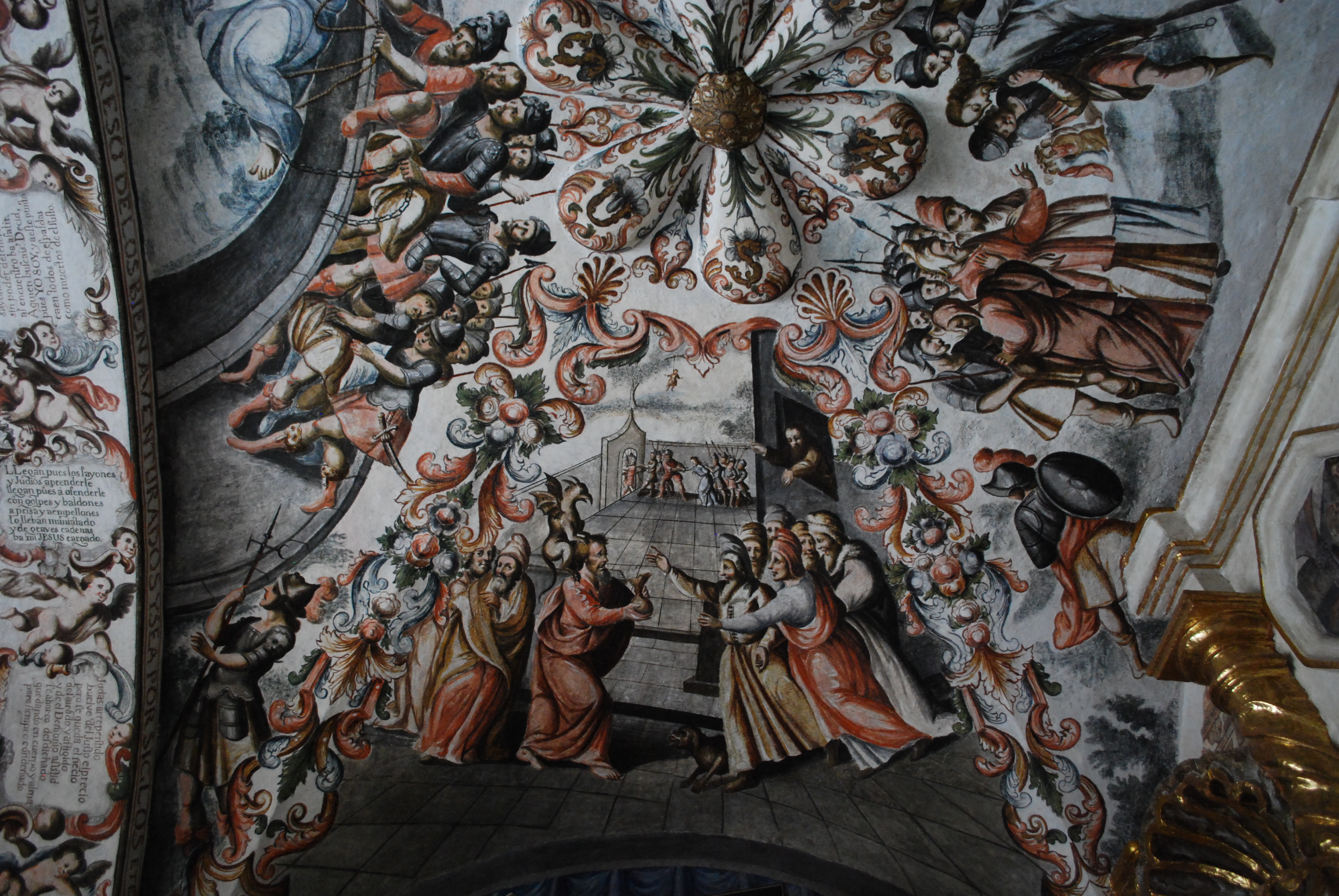
Section of the ceiling in main nave

In the next section there is a representation of Jesus in the house of Caiaphas. Seventy two judges try Jesus with Pontius Pilate on the side in the balcony. On the north side, Pilate appears again but the Jewish judges stay outside the Roman magistrate's house because they are observing Passover. The south side presents Pilate presenting Jesus and Barabbas and asking to choose whom to release. On the east side is a scene with Jesus being flogged while tied to a post. On the south wall, there is a Neoclassical altarpiece of stone with gold leaf. This contains an image of Christ tied to a post and bearing the marks of being flogged. This is called the Señor de la Columna.

Next are verses from the Gospels of Matthew, Mark, and John referring to Jesus after he was flogged by soldiers. Another section shows the Virgin Mary, Mary Magdalene and Mary of Clopas watching the punishment of Jesus from afar. Christ then receives the cross. The next section shows Jesus on his knees with Simon of Cyrene carrying the cross and followed by a large crowd and soldiers. Saint Veronica appears in front of Christ, wiping his face with a cloth. The north and south segments show the falls Jesus suffered while carrying the cross while the three Marys look on.

At the presbytery section, at the location of the main altar, can be found a depiction of Palm Sunday, the crucifixion, and death of Jesus. The main altarpiece was made between 1812 and 1820. It contains the image of Jesus of Nazareth, which was placed there by Father Neri in 1748. This sculpture is made of wood and dressed with a cloth tunic. The face is typical for this kind of image of the 18th century and comes from Seville, Spain .

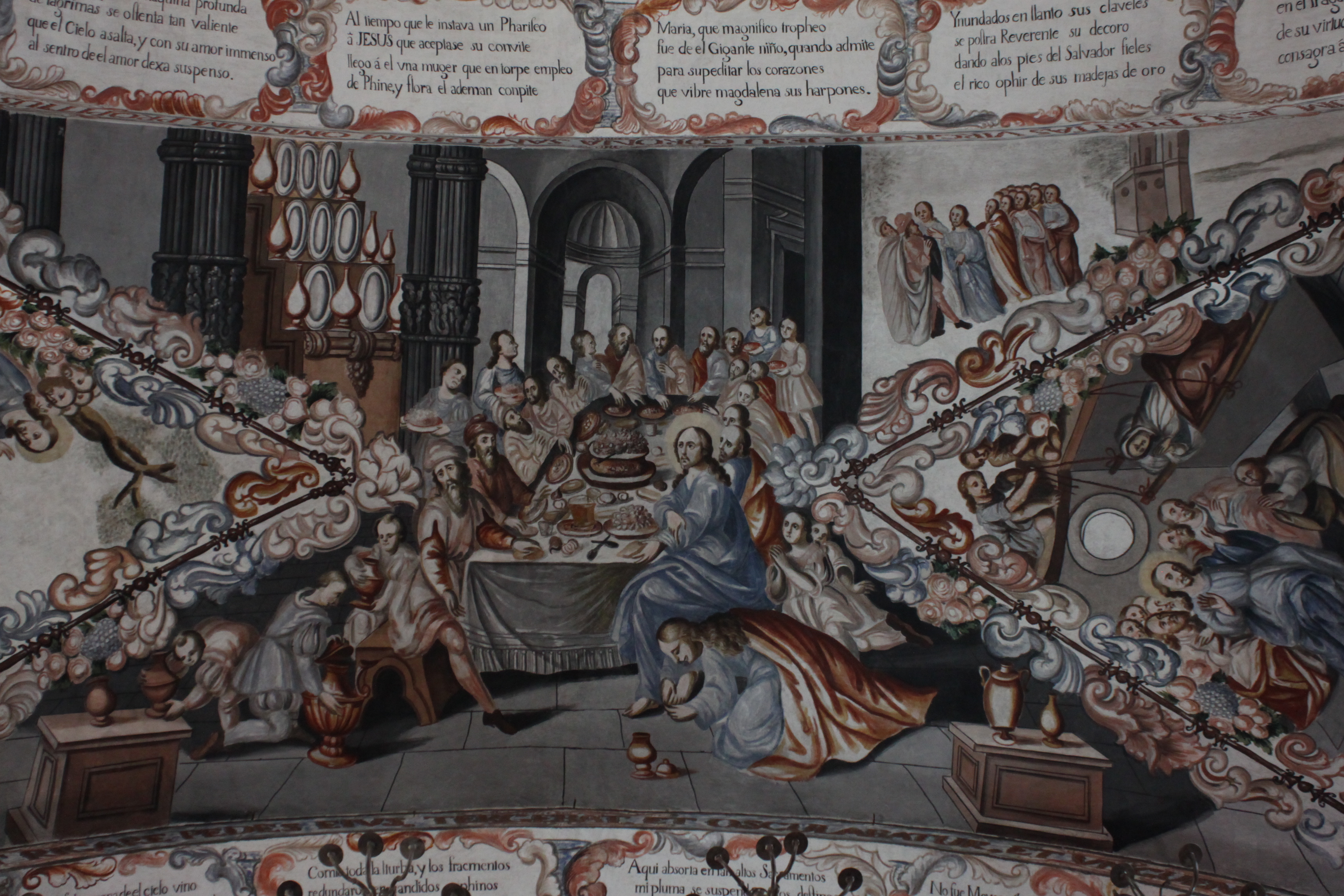
Last Supper

The line along the ceiling of the nave is supposed to trace the path from sin and Hell to the "glory of God's presence." This glory is depicted in a chamber which is located behind the main altar called the Camarín de la Gloria (Chamber of Glory) or Camarín de los Santos Apóstoles (Chamber of the Holy Apostles), which was built between 1740 and 1748, during the first phase of construction. Here is the culmination of the story told by the ceiling murals of the main nave: the Resurrection of Jesus after his Crucifixion. This chamber is circular topped with a dome with the light from the Intern at the top representing the Glory of God. From this fall flames representing the Holy Spirit and in a circular hierarchy down the dome are angels, musicians, and representing the celestial chorus at the bottom of the dome are statues of the Apostles, along with the Virgin Mary as Queen of the Apostles. Above each statue is a shell-shaped medallion representing their martyrdom. Below this are the various sainted founders of Catholic monastic orders such as Augustine of Hippo, Francis of Assisi and Saint Dominic.

On the north side of the nave, there are two chapels with mural work and other decorations. The Belén (Bethlehem) Chapel is dedicated to the birth of Jesus. It was constructed between 1759 and 1763, but the altar is a Neoclassic design dating from the 19th century. It contains medallions painted in oils. The vault contains a conjunction of angels that sing the arrival of the Messiah, peace, and a group of shepherds who come to adore the child. Both the angels and the shepherds hold up signs with the Apostles' Creed. There is also a scene with the Holy Trinity that accompanies the Virgin Mary who is crowned. On the left, idols fall before the birth of Christ. The Capilla del Rosario or Rosary Chapel was constructed in 1763 and its vault is divided into four triangular segments. The north segment contains a naval battle where galleons, with Spanish and Ottoman coats of arms, fire at each other, referring to the Battle of Lepanto. The Virgin of the Rosary is credited with the Spanish victory. On the south side, there is a ceremony dedicated to the Virgin Mary in Rome, presided over by Pope Pius V. The main altar is gilded and contains the image of the Virgin. There are 15 small sections over mirrors with scenes related to the mysteries of the Rosary. On the east and west walls there are images of saints grouped by monastic order. In the interior of the chamber, there are portraits of Father Neri, Esteban Valerio de Alfaro and María Velázquez de Casillta (his parents). By the windows are portraits of Doctor Díaz de Gamarra and Dominican friar Francisco Alonso de Rivera and a self portrait of Pocasangre, who emphasizes his indigenous features. The roof of this inner chamber is in the form of a large shell. Writings such as the Ave Maria, prayers, saints' names and more are inscribed on the ribs of the shell.

=== Annexes ===
On the south side there are six annexes of note. The vault of the old sacristy contains scenes from the life of Father Neri and the construction of the Sanctuary. There are also 12 oils on canvas of the Apostles. Prior to the restoration of the Camarín de la Gloria (Chamber of Glory), the oils on canvas covered medallions on the walls. There is also a painting of Anthony of Padua by Juan Correa as well as paintings of a number of important churchmen and more by anonymous painters. Two paintings compare Jerusalem with San Miguel de Allende and the Sanctuary.

The Capilla de Soledad or Chapel of Solitude was built between 1740 and 1748. The main altar contains the Virgin of Sorrows, weeping for the crucified Jesus. On the south wall, there is a sculpture of Saint Peter crying in regret for having denied Jesus. This chapel is the darkest in the complex as the windows let in little light.

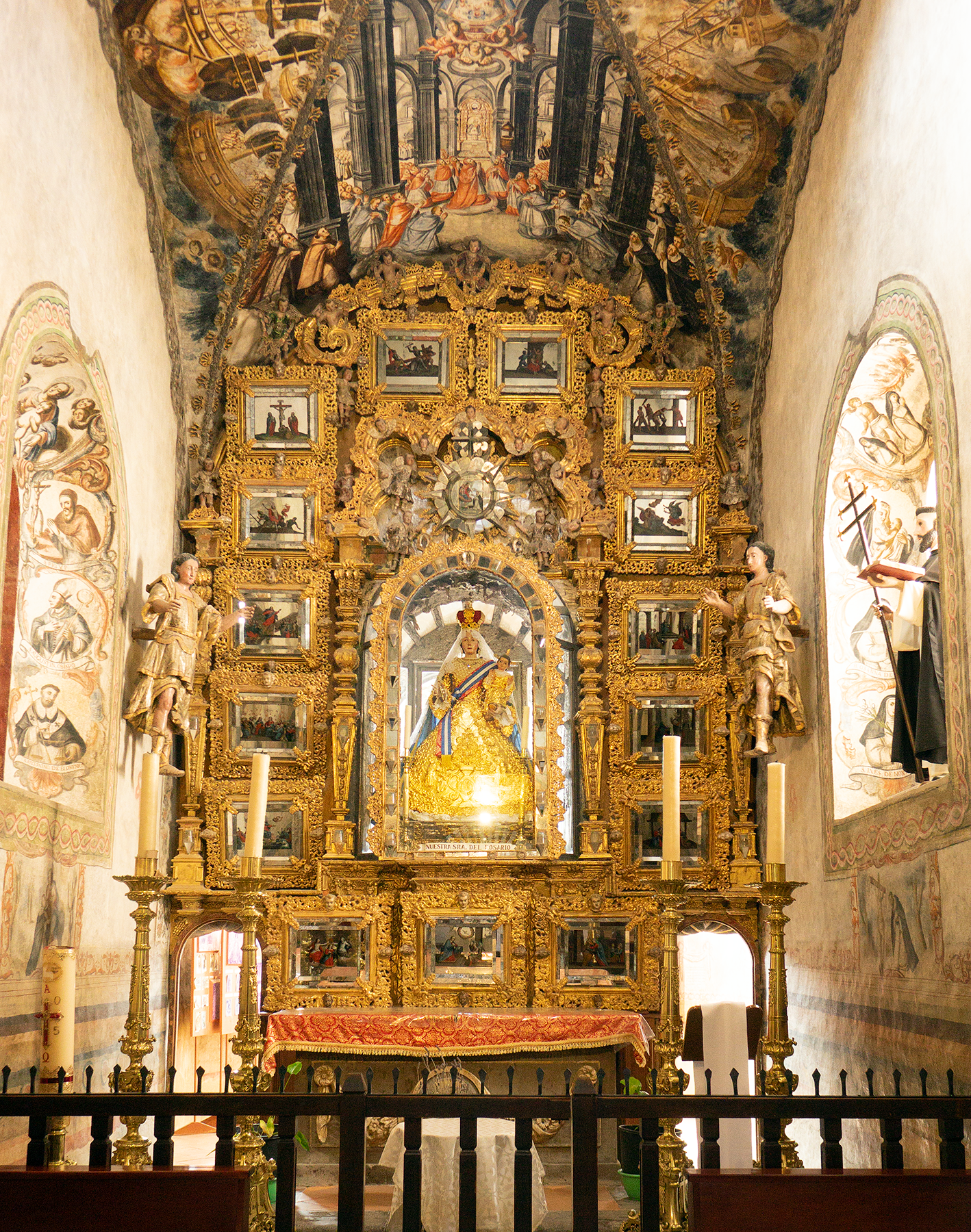
Virgin of Sorrows, altar area

The Capilla de Loreto or Loreto Chapel was built in 1754. There is no direct access to this chapel from the main nave of the church; it is necessary to enter from the current sacristy or through the Capilla de Soledad. The dimensions and shape of this chapel exactly match the Loreto chapels in the monastery of Tepotzotlán and in the church of San Felipe Neri in San Miguel de Allende. The three chapels are based on the layout of the Chapel of Loreto in Ancona, Italy. One wall is painted with a mural of an angel announcing to Mary her pregnancy. There are also various depictions related to the Virgin and the child Jesus.

The area known as the "La Glora Escondida" or "The Hidden Glory" is located on the north side of the choir area, but it is difficult to access. It is a partially hidden rectangular area. It was decorated by Pocasangre with depictions related to the Final Judgment, Hell and sin. There are not Seven Deadly Sins, but eight represented by eight swords topped with the head of a different animal. The north wall contains a triptych where a dying man is surrounded by a priest, a guardian angel, and several demons vying for his soul. In the end, the demons are defeated. The only window is on the right which shows a scene from the Final Judgment which is based on an engraving by Gustave Doré. On the left side, there are depictions of the torments of Hell.

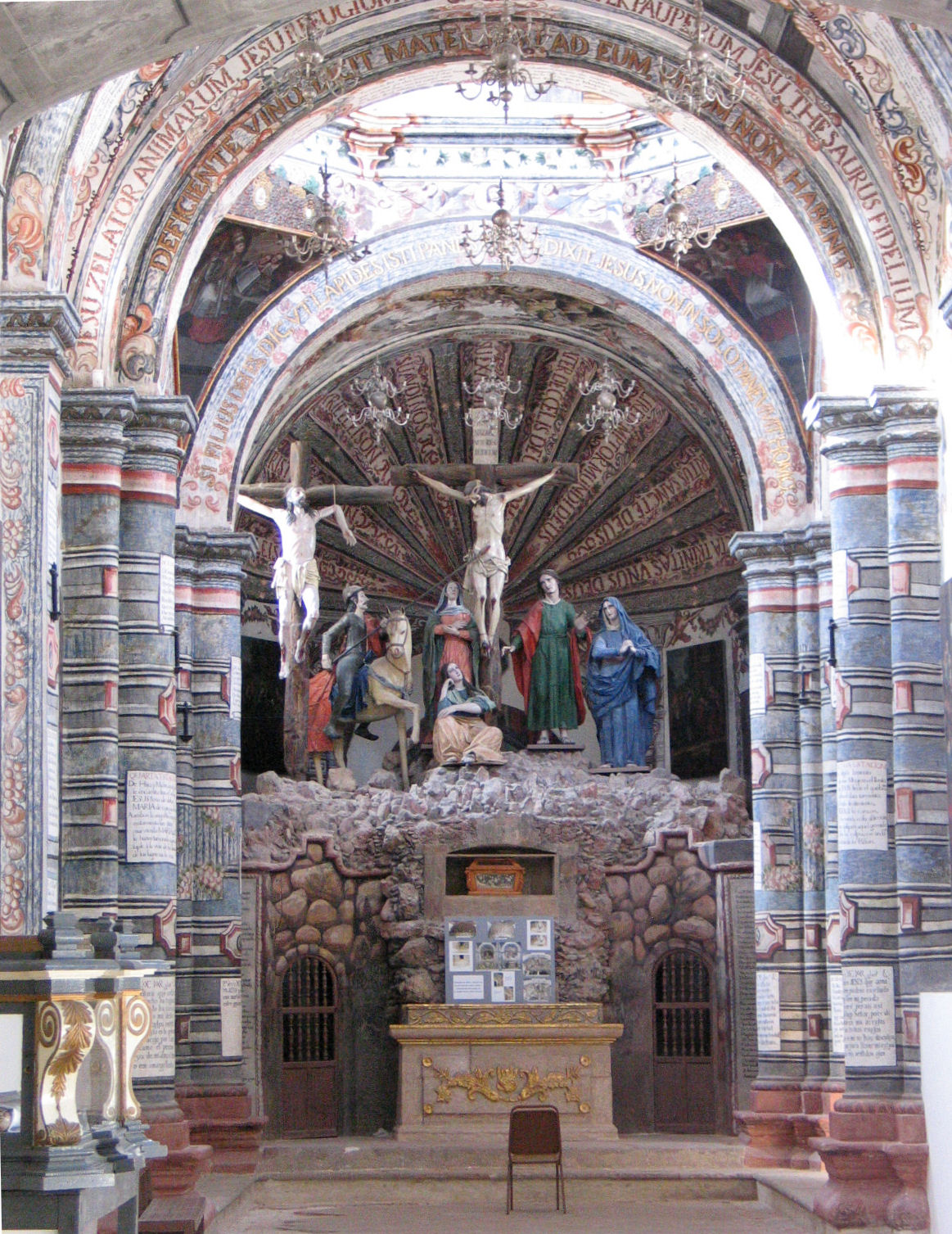
Capilla del Santo Sepulcro

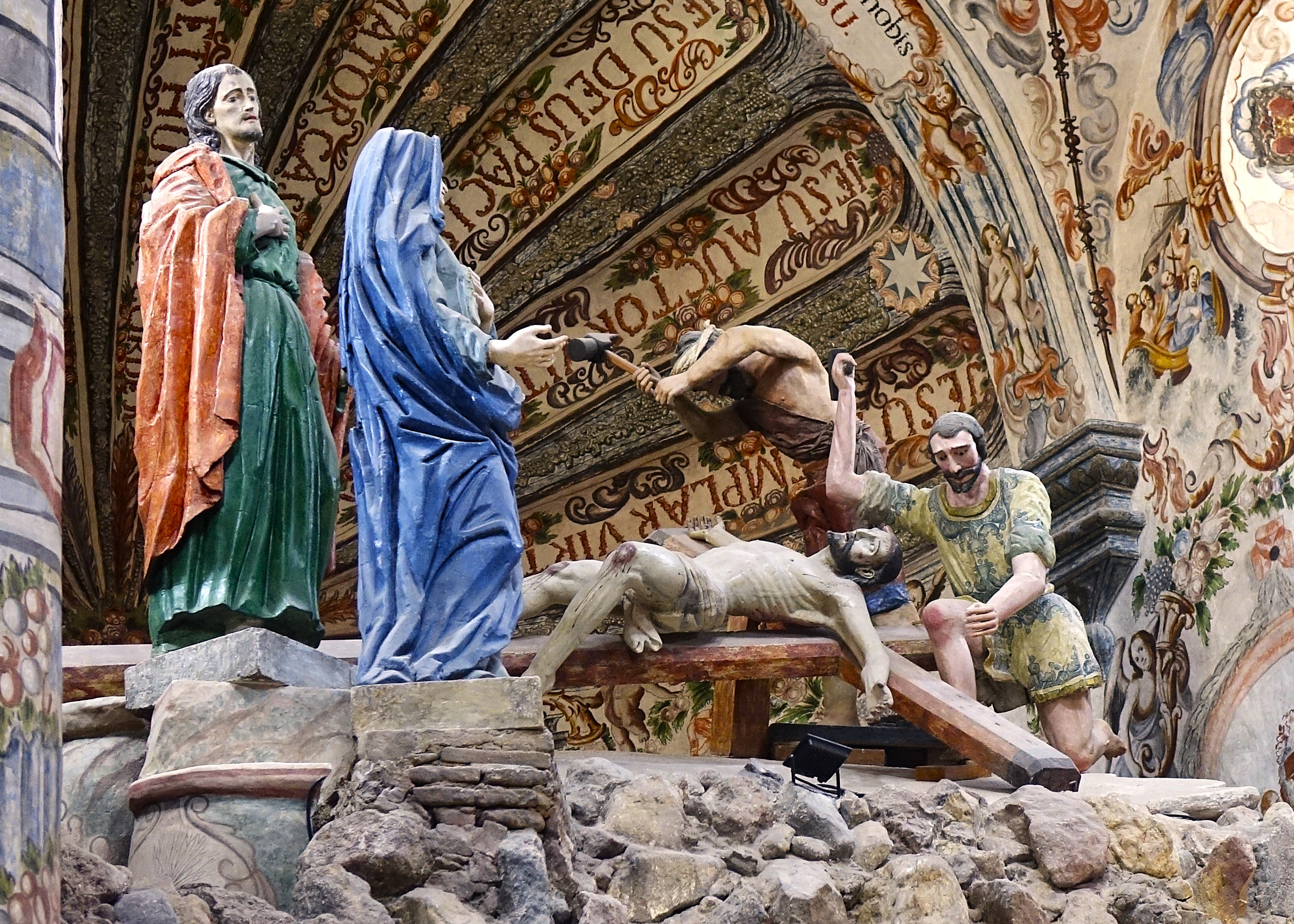
Another diorama in the Capilla del Santo Sepulcro

The Capilla del Santo Sepulcro or Chapel of the Holy Burial was built between 1759 and 1763. The murals here were begun in 1760 and center on the death, burial, and resurrection of Jesus. This area connects the Chapel of the Calvary, which is behind it, by a kind of bridge anchored to the walls. This chapel contains an image of a resuscitated Jesus but still reclined which is notable for the bloody face and the number of precious stones that have been placed on it. These stones have remained despite the various attacks the church has suffered over its history. The roof is trapezoidal decorated with rose windows and four large reliefs of shells. The walls are painted with numerous figures such as Four Evangelists, the Four Fathers of the Church, and a large quantity of angels and cherubs. There are also allusions to the Four Cardinal Virtues, and medallions with scenes of the Resurrection.

The Capilla de Calvario or Calvary Chapel is the largest of the complex and was built between 1763 and 1766. It was also the last that Father Neri had built although he did not live to see its completion. It has a cross layout and is topped with vaults and a cupola. Its decoration is almost purely Mexican Baroque with monumental oil paintings and groups of painted statues that are placed on the floor, walls and ceiling. The columns contain inscriptions of poems written by Father Neri. The three altars contain the best of the sculptures and enclose the transept. These sculptures depict the crucifixion, agony, and descent of Christ after his death. The choir was built between 1759 and 1763. It was originally painted by Pocasangre, but little remains due to subsequent re-paintings and the enclosure of the space when the "Casa de Ejercicios" or meditation room was added. Most of the paintings in this space date from 1867. The area contains a wood organ used to accompany services.

The two parts of the complex which do not connect directly or indirectly to the main nave are the Escuela Santa de Cristo and the Casa de Ejercicios. The Casa de Ejercicios is a prayer and meditation facility which was built according to the principles of Ignatius of Loyola. They are based on a set of spiritual "exercises" designed during the reformation to help Catholics reinforce their faith. This type of building came to Mexico around 1665 and, 100 years later, Father Neri had the casa de ejercicios built. This building is mostly separate from the rest of the complex and is decorated differently. Only inscriptions such as poems appear with the intention of providing meditative help. When Father Neri died, there were 7,541 men who lived and studied there. Today, there are thirty, with 19 being women. However, about 75,000 visit each year.

== Pilgrimage site ==
Since it was built, the complex has been a pilgrimage and procession site. The architecture and decorative features reflect the doctrine of Saint Ignatius of Loyola, as it was built with the principles of the Counter-Reformation in mind. The sanctuary's role as a site for penance, according to the exercises of Ignatius Loyola, began in 1765 with 25 people participating and directed by Father Neri. The sanctuary has been one of the principal places in Mexico to practice the spiritual exercises of Ignatius of Loyola, which include mortification of the flesh through flagellation and fasting. During Holy Week, an estimated 5,000 perform these exercises and wear crowns of thorns on their heads. It is one of 33 weeks out of the year when visitors, mostly from the center and north of the country, visit the Casa de Ejercicios to perform penance. A complete cycle of penance, prayers and meditation lasts eight days. It can receive up to 5,000 visitors each week.

Each year and since 1812, the image of Jesus, depicted tied to a column and beaten, called the Señor de la Columna, has traveled in procession between Atotonilco and San Miguel de Allende. In 1812, the image was requested due to an epidemic that was plaguing the town. Today, and each year on the Saturday prior to Holy Week, it travels to San Miguel and returns to Atotonilco on Thursday night.

== History ==
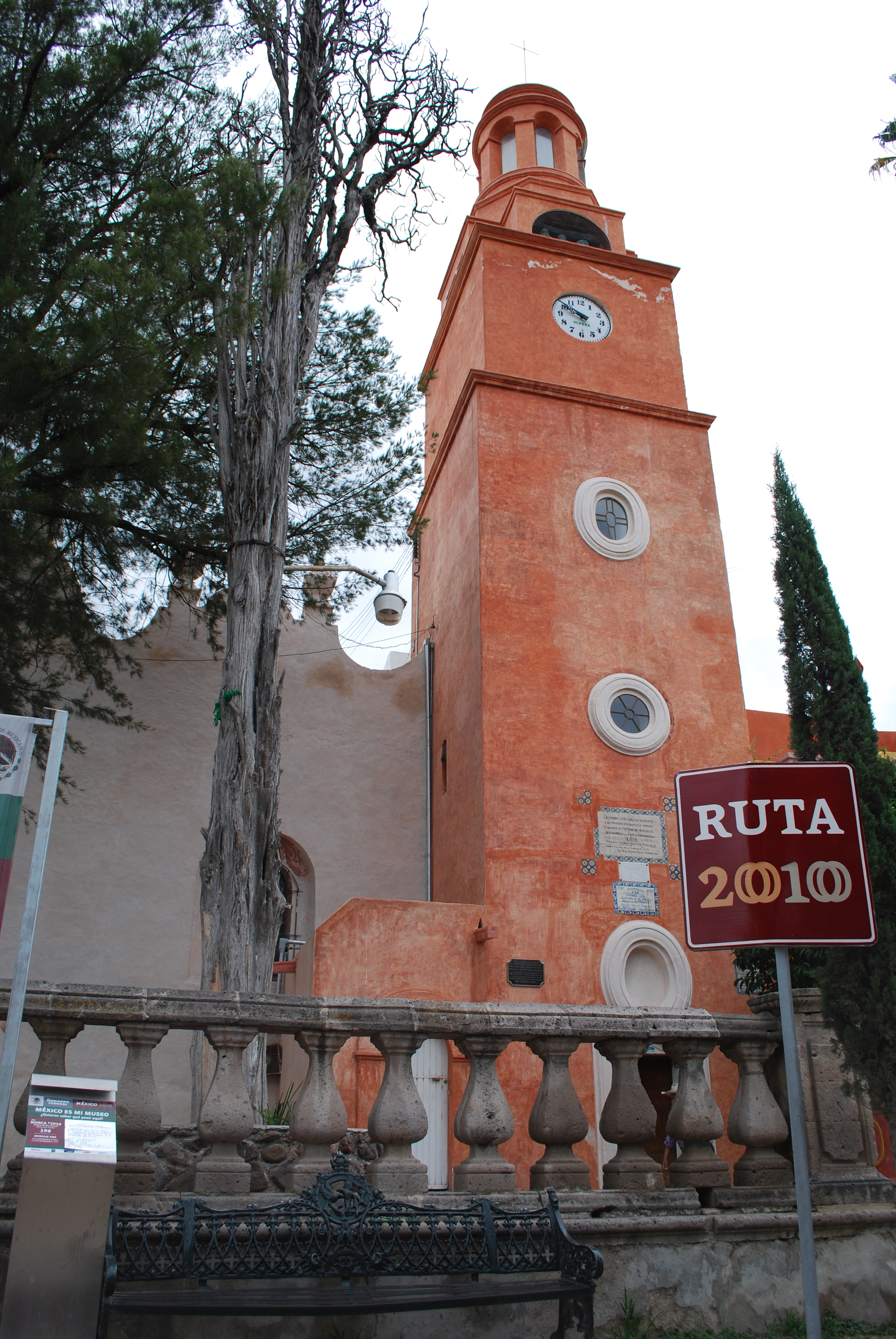
Clock tower

The World Heritage Organization calls it an "exceptional example of the exchange between European and Latin American cultures" and "one of the finest examples of Baroque art and Baroque architecture in the (sic) New Spain." Because of its role in the Mexican War of Independence, it has been registered as one of Guanajuato's 61 historic sites. The area was considered sacred before the arrival of the Spanish because of the hot mineral springs. The name Atotonilco is common in Mexico, especially in the central highlands, with the best known in Jalisco. The name comes from a Nahuatl phrase "in hot water" which refers to thermal springs. Chichimecas came to this particular place to perform penance rites, puncturing themselves with maguey thorns and washing away guilt in the thermal springs.

According to tradition, Father Neri arrived here from preaching at missions in Dolores Hidalgo. While resting under a mesquite tree where the sanctuary is now located, he dreamt of Jesus wearing a crown of thorns and carrying a cross. Jesus told Father Neri that it was his will that the area be converted into a place for penance and prayer. A different version of this story states that Father Neri was here due to his ill health and was assisting at a small church called the Capilla de San Miguelito, which is still found on the banks of the Laja River. At that time, the native Guachichiles and Pames were not completely converted to Christianity and considered the thermal springs in the area sacred and medicinal. It was also supposedly a favored place for rites that included fornication. One reason to build the church was to counter this practice.

Father Neri bought the entire Hacienda de Atotonilco to build the sanctuary and to have enough productive land to support it. On May 3, 1740, a ceremony was held where the Father blessed the first stone laid to construct the complex. When Father Neri traced the layout of the church, it was the morning of May 3, the day of the Holy Cross, when he is said to have seen three rainbows, one to the east, one to the north and one to the south, leaving the west free. The main altar faces in this direction, towards the Holy Land. The first phase of construction lasted from 1740 to 1748 and included the main nave, the tower, and old sacristy, today the Purisisma Chapel. At the end of this phase, it was consecrated and the image of Jesus the Nazarene was placed. The second phase lasted until 1776 when most of the chapels and other annexes were built. As the complex was built, the mural work was done. The main reason behind this was to reinforce the principles of the Council of Trent and the Counter Reformation. During all of this construction, Father Neri lived at the site until his death in 1776. All that was missing at that time was the Santa Escuela annex, the new sacristy, some hallways and the chaplain's house, as well as various sculptures, altars and oil paintings. These were added over the next 100 years.

According to the will of Father Neri, the complex cost 22,647 pesos. The main church is dedicated to Jesus of Nazareth. Beginning 88 years after Father Neri's death, there have been attempts in the 19th and 20th centuries to have the priest beatified, but they have not been successful.

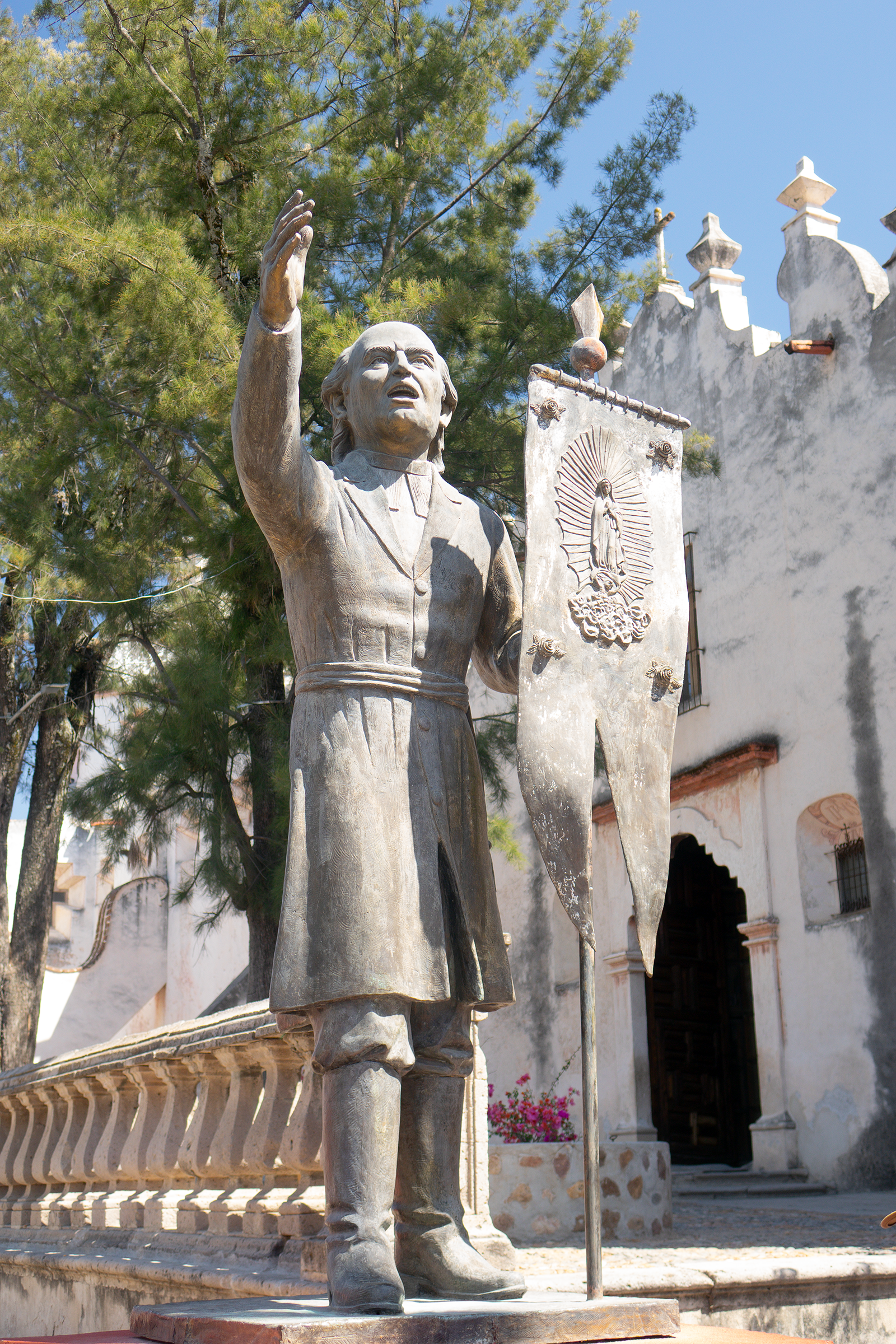
Father Miguel Hidalgo y Costilla with the movement's banner; statue at the Sanctuary of Atotonilco

The church is connected to the events of the Mexican War of Independence in the early 19th century. Ignacio Allende married Maria de la Luz Agustina de las Fuentes in 1802 in this church. More importantly, the initial banner for the nascent insurgent army depicting the Virgin of Guadalupe was taken from here on 16 September 1810. Father Miguel Hidalgo y Costilla led troops under this banner from the sanctuary to San Miguel de Allende, as part of the movement for Mexican Independence. After the war, the community became part of the municipality of San Miguel de Allende.

Since that time the art and architecture of the Sanctuary suffered from deterioration, mostly due to high humidity. This humidity comes from the thermal springs that flow under the ground on which the complex rests, and which also have a high mineral content. The moisture and minerals were seeping into the walls and foundations, causing them to crumble and were causing damage to the murals, oil paintings and sculptures. Restoration work began in 1994, starting with the chapels. To highlight this effort the site was listed in the 1996 World Monuments Watch by the World Monuments Fund. About half of the oil paintings and all of the mural work were saved. Funds for the work came from various sources, including the state and federal governments, the World Monuments Fund and private sources such as American Express. After repairing water damage in the walls and roofs, sealant was applied. Further restoration work was undertaken in 2010 as part of the preparations for Mexico's Bicentennial. The walls and roofs were aired out and old wells were cleaned out to allow drainage away from the foundation. Channels were constructed in the foundation for the same purpose.The remains of the Sagrado Corazon Chapel were demolished. It was not part of the original construction and had blocked light into a portion of the complex. The arch to the La Higuera courtyard was uncovered. However, the tree planted in this courtyard remains as it was planted in memory of the sanctuary's founder. This courtyard was reconstructed as it is an important part in providing light and drainage to keep the complex dry.

== See also ==
- Camino Real de Tierra Adentro

== Bibliography ==
- Rangel Gómez, Samuel (2010). Atotonilco: Santuario de Dios y de la Patria, Relicario del Barroco Mexicano [Atotonilco: Sanctuary of God and Country, Reliquary of Mexican Baroque] (in Spanish). Guanajuato: Universidad de Guanajuato and Amigos de San Miguel, A.C.
- Manríquez, Fernando; Reza Diaz, Julio (2005). Santuario de Atotonilco, Guanajuato: Guía para el visitante [Sanctuary of Atotonilco, Guanajuato:Guide for the visitor] (in Spanish). Guanajuato: Sociedad de Atotonilco.
