= List of World Heritage Sites in Central America =

This is a list of UNESCO World Heritage Sites in Central America.

== Legend ==
Site; as per officially inscribed name
Location; at city, regional, or provincial level and geocoordinates
Criteria; as defined by the World Heritage Committee
Area; in hectares and acres. If available, the size of the buffer zone has been noted as well. A value of zero implies that no data has been published by UNESCO
Year; during which the site was inscribed to the World Heritage List
Description; brief information about the site, including reasons for qualifying as an endangered site, if applicable

== World Heritage Sites ==
† In danger
* Trans-border site

Site	Image	Location	Criteria	Area ha (acre)	Year	Description	Refs
Tikal National Park	Ruins of stone pyramids and other buildings.	Petén Department, Guatemala; 17°13′N 89°37′W	i, iii, iv, ix, x (mixed)	57,600 (142,000)	1979		
Antigua Guatemala	Street with colorful single-storied houses with window grills.	Sacatepéquez Department, Guatemala; 14°34′N 90°40′W	ii, iii, iv (cultural)	49 (120)	1979	Founded in the early 16th century, Antigua was the capital of the Kingdom of Guatemala and its cultural, economic, religious, political and educational centre until a devastating earthquake in 1773. Its principal monuments have been preserved largely as ruins and are an excellent example of Spanish colonial architecture.	
Maya Site of Copan	Stele of human figure with large headdress.	Copán Department, Honduras; 14°51′0″N 89°8′0″W	iv, vi (cultural)	15.095 (37.30); buffer zone 258.365 (638.43)	1980	Image is of Maya stelae H from Copán in Honduras	
Fortifications on the Caribbean Side of Panama: Portobelo-San Lorenzo †	Ruins of a fort near water.	Colón Province, Panama; 9°33′14″N 79°39′21″W	i, iv (cultural)	—	1980	As outstanding examples of Spanish military architecture, the forts were constructed in the 17th and 18th centuries to protect the Isthmus of Panama which had been of great importance to European colonial trade.	
Archaeological Park and Ruins of Quirigua	Tall stone stele decorated with relief.	Izabal Department, Guatemala; 15°16′14″N 89°2′25″W	i, ii, iv (cultural)	—	1981	Quiriguá is an ancient Maya archaeological site that flourished during the Late Classic. The ruins of the site contain outstanding carved stelae and sculpted calendars.	
Darien National Park	An ocelot lying on a tree branch.	Darién Province, Panama; 7°44′N 77°33′W	vii, ix, x (natural)	597,000 (1,480,000)	1981	Situated on the border between South and Central America, the park consists of a wide range of habitats including sandy and rocky coastlines, mangroves, swamps, upland and lowland tropical forests. Two Indian tribes, the Chocó and the Guna live in the property.	
Río Plátano Biosphere Reserve^{†}	River through dense vegetation. Many tree trunks are lying in the river.	La Mosquitia, Honduras; 15°44′40″N 84°40′30″W	vii, viii, ix, x (natural)	500,000 (1,200,000)	1982	Endangered since 2011	
Talamanca Range-La Amistad Reserves / La Amistad National Park	Narrow waterfall	San José, Cartago, Limón and Puntarenas Provinces, Costa Rica*; Bocas del Toro and Chiriquí Provinces, Panama*; 9°24′26″N 82°56′20″W	vii, viii, ix, x (natural)	567,845 (1,403,180)	1983 (Note: Modification of boundaries in 1990 to exclude areas that are not of outstanding universal value and to include the extended Chirripó and Talamanca National Parks.)		
Joya de Cerén Archaeological Site	Archaeological excavation of a building.	La Libertad Department, El Salvador; 13°49′39″N 89°22′9″W	iii, iv (cultural)	—	1993	Joya de Cerén are the remains of a pre-Hispanic farming community that has been preserved largely intact buried under a volcanic eruption around 590 AD. It provides valuable archaeological for everyday life in the 6th century.	
Belize Barrier Reef Reserve System	Underwater image of a green stone like object with patterns on the surface resembling a brain.	Belize, Stann Creek and Toledo districts, Belize; 17°19′N 87°32′W	vii, ix, x (natural)	96,300 (238,000)	1996	The Belize Barrier Reef Reserve System is the largest reef system on the Northern Hemisphere and harbors several threatened species including sea turtles, manatees and the American crocodile. The site was listed as endangered from 2009 to 2018 due to mangrove cutting and overdevelopment. It was removed from the List in danger after a moratorium on oil exploration in the entire maritime zone of Belize and the strengthening of forestry regulations allowing for better protection of mangroves.	
Archaeological Site of Panamá Viejo and Historic District of Panamá	Ruins of a four-storied stone tower.	Panamá Province, Panama; 9°00′24″N 79°29′06″W	ii, iv, vi (cultural)	57 (140)	1997 (Note: Extended in 2003 to include the archaeological site of Panamá Viejo and name change from Historic District of Panamá, with the Salón Bolivar, Panama to the present name.)	Founded in 1519, Panamá Viejo was the first European settlement on the Pacific coast of the Americas. The Historic District is a 17th-century replacement of the original town and preserves its street plan, architecture and blend of Spanish, French and early American styles.	
Cocos Island National Park	Hilly coast with grassland, forest and a sandy beach.	Puntarenas Province, Costa Rica; 5°32′N 87°4′W	ix, x (natural)	199,790 (493,700)	1997 (Note: Extension of the park's marine zone in 2002.)	As the only island in the tropical eastern Pacific, Cocos Island provides unique marine habitats for large pelagic fish such as sharks, tuna, dolphins or rays.	
Area de Conservación Guanacaste	Mountain, grassland and some trees.	Guanacaste and Alajuela provinces, Costa Rica; 10°51′N 85°37′W	ix, x (natural)	147,000 (360,000)	1999 (Note: Extended in 2004 to include the sector Santa Elena.)	Stretching from the Pacific across the Cordillera de Guanacaste to the Atlantic, the site contains a range of habitats, including some of the most pristine wetland forests worldwide and the best dry forest habitats in Central America; that provide space for several threatened plant and animal species such as the saltwater crocodile, leatherback sea turtle, jaguar, jabiru, mahogany or guayacán.	
Ruins of León Viejo	Ruins consisting of foundations of small buildings.	León Department, Nicaragua; 12°23′50″N 86°36′37″W	iii, iv (cultural)	—	2000		
Coiba National Park and its Special Zone of Marine Protection	Sand beach with palm trees and drift wood.	Veraguas and Chiriquí provinces, Panama; 7°26′N 81°46′W	ix, x (natural)	270,125 (667,490)	2005	The park protects islands and marine areas in the Gulf of Chiriquí and is home to an exceptionally large number of endemic mammals, birds and plants as well as to several threatened species. The marine ecosystem is characterized by a very large biodiversity with 760 species of marine fishes, 33 species of sharks and 20 species of cetaceans.	
León Cathedral	Main facade of a large church with two massive and low and three main doors.	León Department, Nicaragua; 12°26′06″N 86°52′41″W	ii, iv (cultural)	0.77 (1.9); buffer zone 13 (32)	2011	Built over more than 150 years starting in the mid-18th century, the cathedral's architecture is a fusion of different styles from Baroque to Neoclassicism and an expression of a new Latin American society that developed around the 18th century.	
Precolumbian Chiefdom Settlements with Stone Spheres of the Diquís	Stone sphere of Costa Rica located at National Museum.	Puntarenas Province, Costa Rica; 8.911389°N 83.477500°W	iii (cultural)	6,172 (15,250); buffer zone 6,080 (15,000)	2014		
National Archaeological Park Tak’alik Ab’aj	Ruins of stone stairway, carved stelae and surrounding jungle.	Retalhuleu Department, Guatemala; 14°38′19″N 91°42′57″W	ii, iii (cultural)	14.88 (36.8)	2023	Archaeological site with the transition from the Olmec civilization to the emergence of Early Mayan culture.	

== Location of sites ==
Location of World Heritage Sites in Central America

== See also ==
- Lists of World Heritage Sites
