= Pitalito =

- Municipality and town
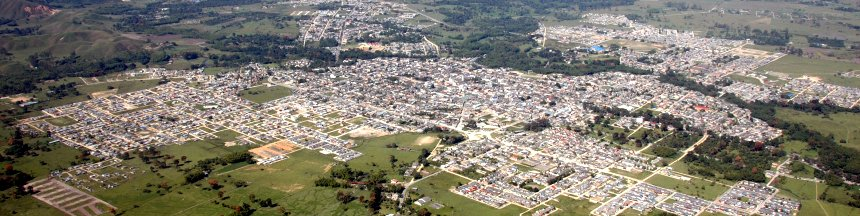
- Aerial view

- Flag Coat of arms

- Location of the municipality and town of Pitalito in the Huila Department of Colombia.

- Location in Colombia
- Coordinates: 1°53′56.09″N 76°02′30.73″W
- Country: Colombia
- Department: Huila Department
- Founded: June 13, 1818

Government
  - Mayor: Miguel Rico

Area
  - Municipality and town: 630.7 km^{2} (243.5 sq mi)
  - Urban: 11.06 km^{2} (4.27 sq mi)
- Elevation: 1,318 m (4,324 ft)

Population (2020 est.)
  - Municipality and town: 128,630
  - Density: 203.9/km^{2} (528.2/sq mi)
  - Urban: 75,434
  - Urban density: 6,820/km^{2} (17,660/sq mi)
- Demonym: Laboyano
- Time zone: UTC-5 (Colombia Standard Time)
- Area code: 57 + 8
- Website: Official website (in Spanish)

Pitalito is a Colombian town and municipality located in southern Department of Huila, Colombia near the Magdalena River Valley, 188 km from Huila's capital, Neiva. It is located in "The Valley of Laboyos" and is the second most populated municipality in the Department of Huila, with a population of 128,630. Pitalito is considered the largest producer of coffee in Colombia. Being at the epicenter of the coffee producing District of Bruselas, the town has become a notable coffee-growing area within Colombia. On several occasions, it has been awarded with the "Cup of Excellence", for producing the best coffee in the country.

The boundaries are Timaná, Elias and Saladoblanco to the North, Palestina to the south, Isnos and San Agustín to the west, and Acevedo to the east.

== History ==
On December 18, 1538, Spanish captain Pedro de Añasco founded a village in the Laboyos Valley, which was initially called Guacacallo, due to its location on a terrace of the Cálamo River. This village played an important role in connecting travelers and merchandise between Quito and Popayán with Bogotá. However, due to constant attacks from local indigenous tribes and from other nearby regions such as the Andaquíes, and also due to an event related to the Cacica Gaitana, the village was moved to the north, near the bank of the Timaná River, where the town of the same name is located today.

This village was the first Spanish foundation in the south of the Alto Magdalena, and its territory corresponded to this geographical area. Since its foundation, the village facilitated not only the transportation of people and merchandise, but also allowed the Spaniards to venture into the territories of the Andaquíes in the foothills (to the east, in what is now the department of Caquetá) and the Mocoas (to the south, in what is now the department of Putumayo, going into the Amazon). Later, the royal road was opened between Timaná and Pasto through the Páramo de las Papas, as a more direct route that would avoid going around Popayán.

Since the foundation of the village, religious centers were established in the places where the indigenous tribes were located in the territory, including the village of the Laboyos Indians. After the relocation of the village, the original site was maintained as a religious center.

In 1818, José Hilario Sierra was appointed Catholic priest of the vice-parish of "Los Laboyos". That year, a few residents of the Laboyos decided to move their homes to Pitalito, a picturesque site two miles to the northeast. Early settlers were attracted to Pitalito because of its fertility, mild climate, the abundance of water, and the ready availability of construction materials.

More residents followed in the same year to emigrate, causing rapid depopulation of Laboyos. Eventually, almost all of its inhabitants moved to Pitalito in the Cálamo estate. The adjacent Solarte estate already had more than two thousand cattle and horses.

Dr. Sierra, seeing that his parishioners were dispersed, decided, under his Ministry, to follow them to Pitalito. He built a hut-chapel where he could administer the Holy Sacraments and celebrate Holy Mass. The chapel, the first in the area, still stands today in the same location as the Temple of San Antonio. In 1819, Dr. Sierra demarcated the square and the streets of the new town in front of the chapel.

After three years and with a growing community, the new village needed a mayor. Don Jorge de Cuéllar, son of Don Luis de Cuéllar, an important figure in the town of Timaná, was appointed to the post. Don Luis was one of the owners of the region and was of noble lineage, being the son of Don Jerónimo de Cuéllar, whose family originated in the kingdoms of Spain, in Andalusia.

== Coffee ==
=== Colombia Supremo 17/18 Pitalito ===
Colombia is the third largest producer of coffee in the world and the largest producer of washed and Arabica coffee. The country is well known for its high-quality coffee and about half of its exports are sent to the United States. Colombia exports approximately 12.5 million bags and domestic consumption is about 2 million bags annually.

Colombia only produces Arabica coffee, mostly washed. There are three prominent varieties grown in Colombia and the coffee is referred to by the region in which it is grown. There are many coffee producing regions in the country. Washed Arabica coffee comes from the town of Pitalito, which lies in southern Huila in the Valley of Laboyos. This southern area of Colombia is at the foot of the Andes mountains. This massive mountain range is the birthplace of the Magdalena River, which travels north to the Caribbean coast.

The valley itself lies at about 1,300 meters above sea level. All the surrounding mountains grow coffee with the average farm having about 6 hectares and about 5,000 trees per hectare. The soil is volcanic, providing plenty of organic nutrients for the high altitude coffee.

==== Cup Characteristics ====
Colombia Pitalito is recognized for having high acidity, medium to good body, and stone fruit notes.

Arabica variety: Caturra and Castillo

Harvest period: October–February

Aroma: Caramel

Flavor: Sweet, Stone fruit, Caramel

Body: Medium body

Acidity: High citric acidity

== Tourism ==
San Agustin Archaeological Park is located 30 miles from Pitalito. This site was declared a UNESCO World Heritage Site in 1995. The site contains the largest collection of religious monuments and megalithic sculptures in Latin America and is considered the world's largest necropolis. Pitalito has the closest airport to San Agustin with flights to Bogota and Cali with the airline SATENA.

== Climate ==
Climate data for Pitalito (Sevilla), elevation 1,320 m (4,330 ft), (1981–2010)
Month	Jan	Feb	Mar	Apr	May	Jun	Jul	Aug	Sep	Oct	Nov	Dec	Year
Mean daily maximum °C (°F)	27.1 (80.8)	27.1 (80.8)	26.7 (80.1)	26.6 (79.9)	26.2 (79.2)	25.5 (77.9)	24.7 (76.5)	25.3 (77.5)	26.2 (79.2)	26.6 (79.9)	26.5 (79.7)	26.7 (80.1)	26.3 (79.3)
Daily mean °C (°F)	21.0 (69.8)	21.1 (70.0)	20.8 (69.4)	20.7 (69.3)	20.5 (68.9)	19.9 (67.8)	19.4 (66.9)	19.5 (67.1)	20.1 (68.2)	20.5 (68.9)	20.6 (69.1)	20.8 (69.4)	20.4 (68.7)
Mean daily minimum °C (°F)	15.4 (59.7)	15.6 (60.1)	15.8 (60.4)	16.0 (60.8)	15.9 (60.6)	15.5 (59.9)	14.9 (58.8)	14.8 (58.6)	14.8 (58.6)	15.4 (59.7)	15.8 (60.4)	15.7 (60.3)	15.5 (59.9)
Average precipitation mm (inches)	61.7 (2.43)	83.9 (3.30)	107.3 (4.22)	135.9 (5.35)	138.4 (5.45)	133.5 (5.26)	123.9 (4.88)	98.6 (3.88)	77.0 (3.03)	99.6 (3.92)	95.8 (3.77)	80.7 (3.18)	1,223 (48.1)
Average precipitation days	12	14	18	20	22	21	22	20	18	17	18	16	215
Average relative humidity (%)	80	80	81	82	82	84	84	83	82	81	82	81	82
Mean monthly sunshine hours	148.8	115.7	99.2	105.0	120.9	114.0	114.7	120.9	126.0	130.2	129.0	145.7	1,470.1
Mean daily sunshine hours	4.8	4.1	3.2	3.5	3.9	3.8	3.7	3.9	4.2	4.2	4.3	4.7	4.0
Source: Instituto de Hidrologia Meteorologia y Estudios Ambientales
