= El Quimbo Dam =

Dam in Colombia

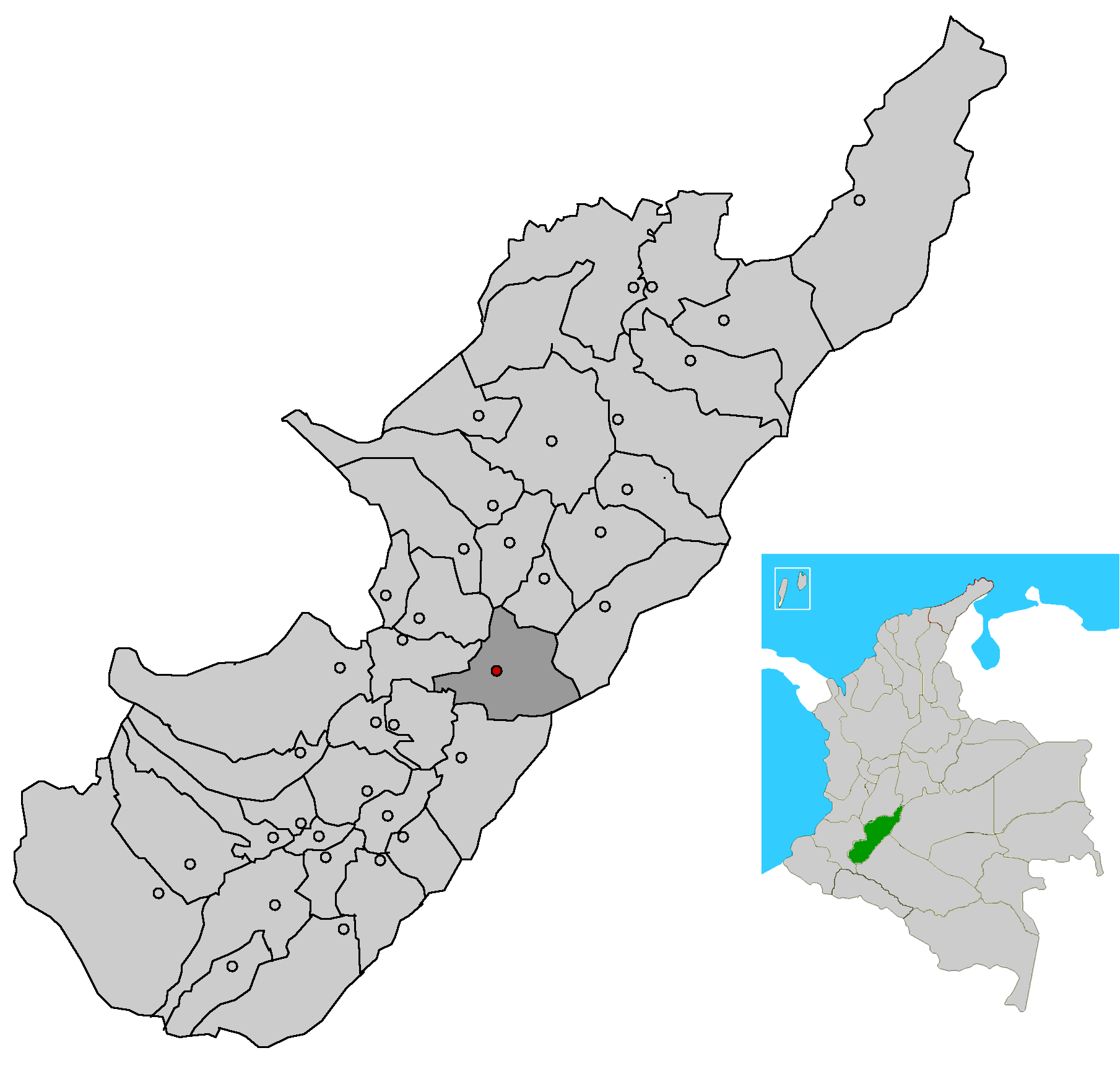
- El Quimbo Dam located in the municipality and town of Gigante, Huila in the Huila Department of Colombia
- Interactive map of El Quimbo Dam
- Official name: El Quimbo Dam
- Coordinates: 2°27′03″N 75°33′43″W
- Construction began: February 2011
- Opening date: November 2015
- Construction cost: US$ 837 million

Dam and spillways
- Impounds: Magdalena River
- Height: 151-metre (495 ft)
- Length: 632-metre (2,073 ft)

Reservoir
- Creates: Hydropower
- Total capacity: 1,824×10^{6} m^{3} (1,479,000 acre⋅ft)
- Surface area: 82.5 km^{2} (31.9 sq mi)

Power Station
- Installed capacity: 400 MW (540,000 hp) (max. planned)
- Annual generation: 2,216 GWh (7,980 TJ)

El Quimbo Dam is a concrete faced rock-fill dam (CFRD) and hydroelectric power facility in the Huila Department of southwestern-central Colombia, approximately 69 kilometres (43 mi) south of the city of Neiva, on the Magdalena River. It is located about 1,300 metres (4,300 ft) upstream from the confluence of the Páez River with the Magdalena River. Its works were officially opened on February 25, 2011 in the presence of President Juan Manuel Santos. It is one of the largest infrastructure projects in the country. The project was completed 4 years later, in late 2015.

The powerhouse near the base of the dam has an installed capacity of 400 MW, which is expected to achieve an average energy generation of 2,216 gigawatt-hours (7,980 TJ)/year, with a dam that will have a live storage of 1,824 million cubic metres (1,479,000 acre⋅ft) and an inundated area 8,250 hectares (20,400 acres). The objective is to enhance the energy security and stability of the Colombian electricity supply, meeting about 8% of energy demand in Colombia with energy prospects of 1,650 gigawatt-hours (5,900 TJ) to 2034.

Environmental license to implement the project was granted by Colombia's Environment Ministry, which was announced by Álvaro Uribe, then President of Colombia, in May 2009. It is the first private sector hydro project to be built in Colombia under a new government policy. Apart from implementing the project, environmental issues were to be addressed by Emgesa, the project developer, such as compensatory afforestation, compensation to project-affected people (no indigenous people are affected) and the protection of water supplies.

Emgesa will receive, under a 20-year power contract authorized by Colombia's Comision de Regulacion de Energia y Gas (CREG), a price of US$14 per megawatt-hour for the power sold to the department. It is also intended to sell the electricity to neighbouring countries, thus boosting the national economy. The project is estimated to cost around $837 million, invested by Spanish utility Endesa, through its Colombian subsidiary Emgesa.

== Geography ==
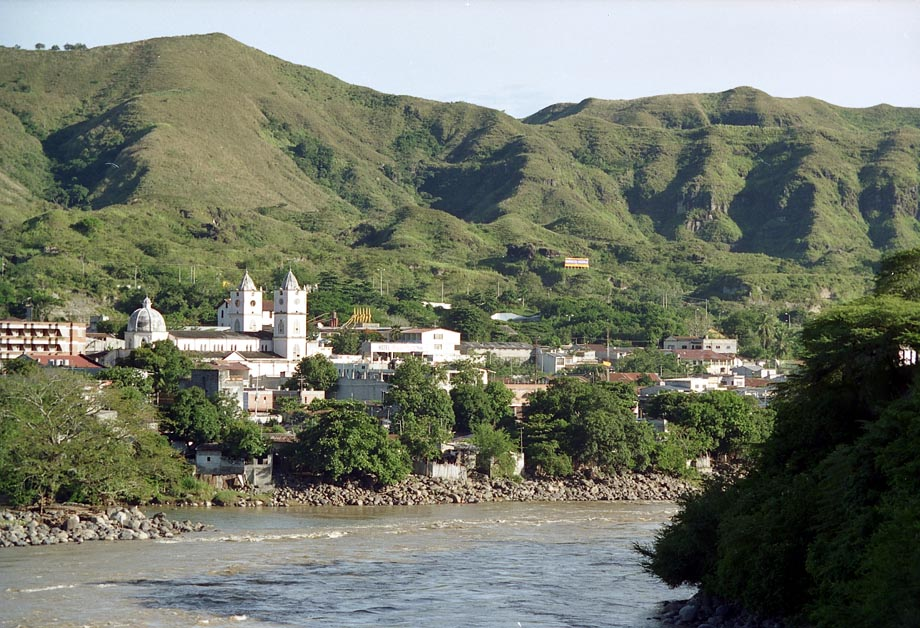
Magdalena River with Honda city on its bank

The dam is located in Colombia, in the Magdalena River basin formed by the central and eastern mountain ranges, to the south of department of Huila. The administrative jurisdiction of the project covers the municipalities of Garzón, Gigante, El Agrado, Paicol, Tesalia and Altamira. However, the dam and the project's powerhouse are located within the municipality of Gigante. The existing Betania Dam is about 35 kilometres (22 mi) downstream. Bogotá, the capital of Colombia is 379 kilometres (235 mi) to the north. It is 60 kilometres (37 mi) to the south of Neiva, 16 kilometres (9.9 mi) from Gigante and 40 kilometres (25 mi) from Garzón.

The project area lies in the narrow gorge section of the Magdalena River. The rock formation is of friable sandstones of tertiary age. It is 1.3 kilometres (0.81 mi) upstream from the confluence of the Magdalena and Páez Rivers. The contractor will provide about 48,000 million pesos to build the perimeter road that will boost tourism and commercial development southwest of the Huila Department.

== Project description ==
The proposed hydroelectric project, a run-of-river reservoir scheme, consists of a 151-metre (495 ft) high concrete-faced rock fill dam (CFRD) on the Magdalena River. The length of the dam is 632 metres (2,073 ft). There is also an auxiliary dam (an auxiliary dike) of 66 metres (217 ft) height and 390 metres (1,280 ft) crest length. The full reservoir level in the dam is 720 metres (2,360 ft) above sea level (asl) and foundation level is 573 metres (1,880 ft) asl. The reservoir created by the dam has an area of 8,250 hectares (20,400 acres) and stretches over a length of 55 kilometres (34 mi), with an average width of 1.4 kilometres (0.87 mi). Other features of the project include a diversion tunnel to facilitate construction of the dam (to divert river flows away from the working area of the dam) which is 489 metres (1,604 ft) long, a spillway structure to route the design flood discharge, two intake structures (spaced at 30 metres (98 ft)) to divert water through two penstock lines (480.87 metres (1,577.7 ft) length) to the powerhouse located on the downstream.

Emgesa has committed to buying 7,500 hectares (19,000 acres) of land for 17,000 million pesos to connect two forest reserves in the area of influence (Reserva Forestal de la Amazonía y la Reserva Forestal Central). There are also plans to build a viaduct over the reservoir that will connect the municipalities of Garzón and El Agrado. The decision to build this major dam as a concrete faced rockfill dam was decided after studying several types of dams for the prevailing site conditions. The site conditions, which dictated the choice of the dam, are the narrow gorge of the river and the geological formation of highly friable sandstones at the dam site. The project area is subject to earthquakes and seismic factors have been accounted for in the design of the dam and appurtenant works. Nine earthquakes were experienced in Colombia between 1762 and 1994 with the earthquake event of 2 February 1736 with magnitude of 6.3 on Richter scale to last one on 6 June 1994 of magnitude 6.6 with epicentre of 73 km distance of the project site, which caused severe damage and fatalities. Twenty-three active unstable slope areas, with two potentially unstable land slides (mud slides) are also noted in the project area.

Construction materials involved in building the project complex include: concrete-205,000 cubic metres (7,200,000 cu ft); surface excavation–3,820,000 cubic metres (135,000,000 cu ft); underground excavation–460,000 cubic metres (16,000,000 cu ft); rockfill embankment–12,000,000 cubic metres (420,000,000 cu ft); and steel reinforcement–15,000 tonnes.

Power generation

The powerhouse located at the toe of the dam has two vertical axis Francis turbines each of 200MW capacity. Each is designed for a discharge of 166.53 cubic metres per second (5,881 cu ft/s). The generators are of the synchronous type with a generation capacity of 225 MVA. The generation voltage is 13.8 kV. Single-phase transformers of 75 MVA capacity with a voltage relation of 13.8–230 kV are proposed. A switch yard is located adjoining the powerhouse. Power is evacuated through 230 kV transmission line of 17 kilometres (11 mi) length from the switch yard to Betania-San Bernardino transmission system.

== Impacts ==
=== Ecological impacts ===
The ecological and social impacts have been examined in great details and remedial actions have been planned for all the identified impacts. The major impacts are submergence of land (both agricultural and forest areas), displacement of people coming under submergence, submergence of a bridge over the Yaguilga River, submergence of the church of San José de Belén, the submergence of cocoa orchards of Río Loro, 78 archaeological sites between two archaeological regions, effect on fisheries, terrestrial fauna due to submergence and submergence of infrastructure works.

=== Mitigation measures ===
The project will require evicting 467 families and flooding 8,250 hectares (20,400 acres) of prime land in this region. The developer has to ensure that the project affected people have the same or better quality of life in the new areas where they would be resettled with "all public services, health coverage and education, restoration of economic activity and level income equal or greater than the current conditions". Irrigation facilities shall be provided to the resettled families for 5200 ha with facilities for organic production as a measure for the conversion of soil and natural animal management; reforestation in a new land area acquired by the developer shall cover 11079.6 ha to compensate for the loss of 3034ha due to submergence, which shall also ensure the restoration of tropical dry forest for 5 years; shift the church of San José de Belén and rebuild at the new location; removal all vegetation in the submergence area before reservoir filling to prevent decomposition of vegetation and growth of aquatic macrophytes; create an information base on the archaeological sites coming under submergence with due research; repopulate migratory species of fish in the upstream areas of the river and also establish two limnigraph stations; create suitable dumping areas to dispose excavated material which are not used on the project; establish alternate roads, bridges, water supply works and other infrastructure facilities that would be submerged; and rehabilitate of fauna coming under submergence areas by measures such as chasing, capturing and relocation of the fauna (small, medium and large mammals, serpents and birds) and also establish two veterinary units to treat wounded animals.

A ferry and six landings are planned to tap the tourism potential of the new dam; 25,000 million pesos have been set aside for this. The reservoir will also benefit the development of fish farming.

=== Eviction ===
On February 21, 2012, Revista Semana published a report that makes reference to a video produced by Bladimir Sánchez, a Communicator from the Huila Department. The video documents events that took place between February 14 and 15, 2012 during the eviction of protesters such as local fishermen and miners by the Colombian Police Force. Several were injured by the excessive use of force demonstrated by the Police during these events.
