= La Plata, Huila =

La Plata, Huila San Sebastian de la Plata
- Municipality and town
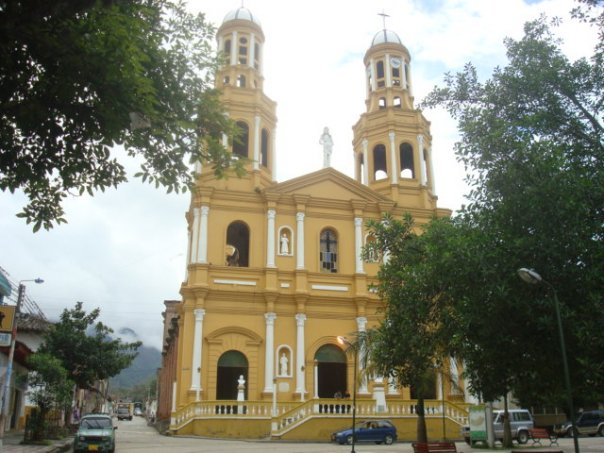

- Flag Coat of arms
- Nicknames: La Plata, Huila
- Motto: Huila Folk of Paradise
- Location of the municipality and town of La Plata, Huila in the Huila Department of Colombia.

- Location in Colombia
- Coordinates: 02°23′24″N 75°54′27″W
- Country: Colombia
- Department: Huila Department

Area
  - Municipality and town: 814.6 km^{2} (314.5 sq mi)
  - Urban: 3.47 km^{2} (1.34 sq mi)
- Elevation: 1,050 m (3,440 ft)

Population (2018 census)
  - Municipality and town: 61,026
  - Density: 74.92/km^{2} (194.0/sq mi)
  - Urban: 25,791
  - Urban density: 7,430/km^{2} (19,300/sq mi)
- Time zone: UTC-5 (Colombia Standard Time)
- Website: http://www.facebook.com/LaPlataHuilaColombia - http://www.laplata-huila.gov.co

La Plata is a town and municipality in the Huila Department, Colombia, with a municipal population of 61,026 (2018 census) including the rural area, situated at an altitude of 1,050 m. It is located 122 km away from Neiva, 147 km from the city of Popayán and 210 km from the town of San Agustín.

The municipality is located in the southwestern part of the department of Huila, in the foothills of the Cordillera Central, is geographically situated at coordinates 2 ° 23'00" North Latitude and 75 ° 56'00" West Longitude.

The municipality is bordered on the north by the Cauca Department, on the south by the municipality of La Argentina, on the east by the municipalities of Paicol and Pital and the west by the Cauca Department.

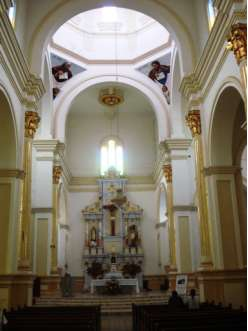
Iglesia San Sebastián La Plata.

== History ==
The foundation and establishment as a municipality dates from June 5, 1651 by Captain Diego de Ospina y Maldonado, at which organizes the parish of San Sebastián de La Plata. This foundation is attributed to the passage of Sebastián de Belalcázar for the lands of the Cauca in the search for El Dorado on the connection between Santa Fe and Quito, and the interest result of the Spanish to the discovery of mines silver existing in this area. Over time, the city has witnessed three foundations the first given by the insurrection of the Spanish crown on October 22, 1553, the second due to the extraction and trade of silver in early 1554 and the third because to destruction by the Indians Paez Andaquíes and Yalcones on June 17, 1577. La Plata is a historic town, it was visited by Simón Bolívar on several occasions as he headed to spend time in nearby plantations. Close to the city there is a religious pilgrimage site called ′la Quiebra Milagrosa′.

=== History of the Cathedral of San Sebastian de La Plata ===
La Plata's parish since the nineteenth century, several churches have been built but all were of modest proportions, only in the early twentieth century the imposing building starts now exists. The first stone was laid by Archbishop Lopez's father being parish priest Emigdio Artunduaga the October 3, 1934 and the blessing and consecration of Bishop Martinez made the April 29, 1957. The Temple of San Sebastian has three naves in whole. In the front stand, the two sides two bold towers 52 meters high, on the back silver dome rises nearly hemispherical with large windows, on the front dihedral summit of the central nave climbs a statue San Sebastian gigantea height of 5.40 meters in four niches in the front of the main wall are the statues of San Pablo, San Pedro, San Juan Bosco and Our Lady. The length of the ship is 60 meters. And the width of 30 meters. At the bottom of the aisles is artistically made and decorated altars.

== Sociocultural context ==
La Plata is a town wide historic tradition that dates from the discovery itself of the department of Huila. Its strategic location in the system of regional relations makes it a meeting place and crossroads which prints high dynamics of urban renewal while maintaining the traditions that have preserved for so many years.

== Sites of Interes Culture General ==
The main attractions are the National Park Puracé, Moscopan monolithic statuary, statuary Aguabonita, Laguna de San Rafael, San Andres lagoon, the river of silver, Custodio García Rovira park, the park pola, the sulfur waterfall, the Cascade hop Candelaria, the monkey waterfall, waterfalls and San Nicolas Bedon, thermal San Sebastian, San Sebastian Cathedral, and the temple in San Andres pierdra.

== Ecology ==
The ecosystem is an important wildlife value, presenting a rich biodiversity including birds, antelope, plantigrade (spectacled bears), Snakes (jackets and coral), some smaller cats (ocelot) and other minor species. The Natural Park buffer zone of the Nevado del Huila, constitutes the most important ecosystem for the city of Palermo, accounting for biodiversity in woodland size and high water potential. San Isidro with an area of 412.5 hectares, located on the sidewalks Horizonte, Viso and Florida between 2,400 and 2,700 m, which corresponds to the municipality and is shared with the town of Teruel. It is a vacant lot consisting of secondary forest species Cedro intervened Black, Butter, Apple, White Yarumo, tree ferns, palm Boa, among others, in addition, some animal species such as Pava Guiche, Tigrillo, Cuzumbo, foxes, mice, Squirrels, Bats, etc.

== Tourism ==
Waterfall Azufrada Dos Aguas Archaeological Zone: Located in the inspection of San Vicente, Thermal Cascada San Sebastian de la Mona: take the name from the water source to the form Private Reserve Meremberg:means "sea of mountains'region is the largest source of municipal water, and there are natural forests cedar Oak, Charum, Igua pink encerillo, candles, and lagoons and swamps. Cascada de La Candelaria: falling over 150 meters high.

== Economy ==
Livestock sector: the municipality are located in two strips parallel to the warm areas between the 460 meters to 1,200 meters and the cold zone 1,800 to 2,500 masl with a total area of 56,460 hectares. As the main production systems of dual purpose cattle, agriculture, aquaculture (warm and cold), pig and other minor economic importance. Agricultural Economic Sector Agriculture is one of the most important lines in the economy of the municipality. This economy is represented mainly by rice, coffee / banana, banana, cacao / banana, corn, sugarcane, beans, potatoes, and some fruits such as lulus, tree tomato and blackberry, beautiful hymn of the municipality of La Plata, Huila, Colombia.

== Educatión ==
=== Public and private schools ===
- Departmental Marillac Educational Institution
- Educational Institution San Sebastian
- Agricultural Technical Educational Institution
- Educational Institution Luis Carlos Trujillo Polanco
- Educational Institution Misael Pastrana Borrero
- Business School of the Andes.
- Creative World School
- School Evita Roso de Palacios
- Modern Lyceum Plateño
- José Celestino Mutis Institute.

=== higher education ===
- SENA
- Universidad Surcolombiana
- UNAD Universidad Nacional Abierta y a Distancia
- Universidad Minuto de Dios
- Corporación Universitaria Remington

== Anthem Municipality of La Plata ==
Plateñas Nights Perfume and stars

- be wearing evening while
- dancing with the crests and swings flowers
- With rumors running
- the river birds fell asleep
- lilies will bloom the Rosas and orange
- (a)I will always remember nights plateñas
- and the great reception from his
- lordship Huila plateau Dona Ana Julia
- is the traditional big Tolima
- The echo of laughter and songs
- murmur pour into the island from which
- watchful sentinel image San Sebastian
- impressive rises Cross
- the night air hits me
- Fresh Faceare the breezes
- that come from Coconuco
- or are breezes that come from
- traditions that surround
- Puracé beyond
- the beautiful
- night Plateñas Cauca not forget.

== Climate ==
Climate data for La Plata (Esc Agr La Plata), elevation 1,070 m (3,510 ft), (1981–2010)
Month	Jan	Feb	Mar	Apr	May	Jun	Jul	Aug	Sep	Oct	Nov	Dec	Year
Mean daily maximum °C (°F)	28.2 (82.8)	29.0 (84.2)	28.6 (83.5)	28.5 (83.3)	28.4 (83.1)	28.2 (82.8)	27.9 (82.2)	28.7 (83.7)	29.6 (85.3)	29.1 (84.4)	28.0 (82.4)	28.1 (82.6)	28.5 (83.3)
Daily mean °C (°F)	22.1 (71.8)	22.6 (72.7)	22.4 (72.3)	22.3 (72.1)	22.3 (72.1)	21.8 (71.2)	21.7 (71.1)	22.2 (72.0)	22.8 (73.0)	22.5 (72.5)	22.2 (72.0)	22.1 (71.8)	22.2 (72.0)
Mean daily minimum °C (°F)	17.6 (63.7)	17.8 (64.0)	18.0 (64.4)	18.2 (64.8)	18.0 (64.4)	17.4 (63.3)	16.8 (62.2)	16.6 (61.9)	16.8 (62.2)	17.6 (63.7)	18.1 (64.6)	17.8 (64.0)	17.6 (63.7)
Average precipitation mm (inches)	144.3 (5.68)	149.8 (5.90)	169.4 (6.67)	168.8 (6.65)	139.8 (5.50)	84.7 (3.33)	67.9 (2.67)	46.0 (1.81)	71.4 (2.81)	155.4 (6.12)	164.5 (6.48)	151.2 (5.95)	1,513.2 (59.57)
Average precipitation days	16	17	21	21	22	19	18	14	14	19	21	19	213
Average relative humidity (%)	83	81	82	83	83	82	79	75	73	78	83	84	80
Mean monthly sunshine hours	151.9	127.0	114.7	111.0	124.0	117.0	120.9	127.1	126.0	133.3	129.0	148.8	1,530.7
Mean daily sunshine hours	4.9	4.5	3.7	3.7	4.0	3.9	3.9	4.1	4.2	4.3	4.3	4.8	4.2
Source: Instituto de Hidrologia Meteorologia y Estudios Ambientales
