= Altamira Municipality =

Altamira Municipality may refer to:

- Altamira, Huila, a town and municipality in the Huila Department of Colombia
- Altamira, Tamaulipas, a municipality in the Mexican state of Tamaulipas
