= Pital =

Pital may refer to:

- Pital, San Carlos, a district of the province of Alajuela in Costa Rica
- Pital, Huila, a town and municipality in the Huila Department, Colombia
