= Acevedo Municipality =

Acevedo Municipality may refer to:

- Acevedo, Huila, Colombia
- Acevedo Municipality, Miranda, a municipality in Venezuela
