= Colombia, Huila =

Coordinates: 3.37778°N 74.8078°W

- Municipality and town
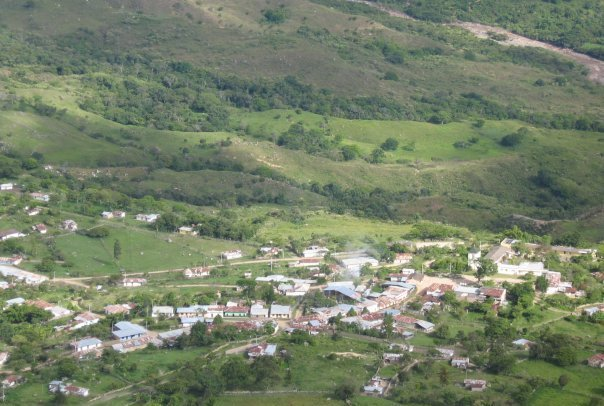

- Flag Coat of arms

- Location of the municipality and town of Colombia, Huila in the Huila Department of Colombia.
- Country: Colombia
- Department: Huila Department

Area
  - Total: 1,538 km^{2} (594 sq mi)

Population (Census 2018)
  - Total: 7,040
  - Density: 4.58/km^{2} (11.9/sq mi)
- Time zone: UTC-5 (Colombia Standard Time)

Colombia is a town and municipality in the Huila Department, Colombia.

== Climate ==
Climate data for Colombia (Sta Ana), elevation 1,410 m (4,630 ft), (1981–2010)
Month	Jan	Feb	Mar	Apr	May	Jun	Jul	Aug	Sep	Oct	Nov	Dec	Year
Mean daily maximum °C (°F)	26.0 (78.8)	26.0 (78.8)	25.4 (77.7)	24.9 (76.8)	24.4 (75.9)	24.3 (75.7)	24.4 (75.9)	25.3 (77.5)	25.9 (78.6)	25.6 (78.1)	24.7 (76.5)	25.1 (77.2)	25.2 (77.4)
Daily mean °C (°F)	20.1 (68.2)	20.3 (68.5)	20.1 (68.2)	19.9 (67.8)	19.8 (67.6)	19.3 (66.7)	19.2 (66.6)	19.7 (67.5)	20.0 (68.0)	20.0 (68.0)	19.8 (67.6)	19.9 (67.8)	19.8 (67.6)
Mean daily minimum °C (°F)	15.7 (60.3)	16.0 (60.8)	16.4 (61.5)	16.5 (61.7)	16.3 (61.3)	15.5 (59.9)	15.1 (59.2)	15.2 (59.4)	15.7 (60.3)	15.9 (60.6)	16.3 (61.3)	15.9 (60.6)	15.9 (60.6)
Average precipitation mm (inches)	63.9 (2.52)	62.9 (2.48)	113.5 (4.47)	111.7 (4.40)	107.3 (4.22)	60.9 (2.40)	60.9 (2.40)	36.7 (1.44)	54.7 (2.15)	133.6 (5.26)	155.7 (6.13)	83.7 (3.30)	1,034 (40.7)
Average precipitation days	10	10	16	18	19	17	16	11	14	19	20	14	182
Average relative humidity (%)	80	80	82	83	84	84	82	79	77	80	83	81	81
Source: Instituto de Hidrologia Meteorologia y Estudios Ambientales

Climate data for Colombia (Legiosa La), elevation 1,476 m (4,843 ft), (1981–2010)
Month	Jan	Feb	Mar	Apr	May	Jun	Jul	Aug	Sep	Oct	Nov	Dec	Year
Mean daily maximum °C (°F)	23.6 (74.5)	24.1 (75.4)	23.4 (74.1)	22.9 (73.2)	22.8 (73.0)	21.2 (70.2)	20.9 (69.6)	21.7 (71.1)	23.1 (73.6)	23.8 (74.8)	23.5 (74.3)	23.6 (74.5)	22.8 (73.0)
Daily mean °C (°F)	19.5 (67.1)	19.6 (67.3)	19.5 (67.1)	19.3 (66.7)	18.9 (66.0)	18.0 (64.4)	17.6 (63.7)	18.2 (64.8)	19.0 (66.2)	19.3 (66.7)	19.3 (66.7)	19.3 (66.7)	18.9 (66.0)
Mean daily minimum °C (°F)	16.3 (61.3)	16.7 (62.1)	16.8 (62.2)	16.7 (62.1)	16.4 (61.5)	15.9 (60.6)	15.3 (59.5)	15.6 (60.1)	16.0 (60.8)	16.3 (61.3)	16.4 (61.5)	16.3 (61.3)	16.2 (61.2)
Average precipitation mm (inches)	68.7 (2.70)	87.1 (3.43)	133.7 (5.26)	202.1 (7.96)	272.0 (10.71)	322.1 (12.68)	330.7 (13.02)	247.3 (9.74)	168.0 (6.61)	163.8 (6.45)	187.8 (7.39)	106.0 (4.17)	2,289.2 (90.13)
Average precipitation days	12	13	19	25	28	27	27	26	23	24	25	19	266
Average relative humidity (%)	82	82	84	86	85	86	86	84	82	82	85	83	84
Mean monthly sunshine hours	164.3	132.7	105.4	93.0	93.0	72.0	86.8	111.6	138.0	136.4	126.0	148.8	1,408
Mean daily sunshine hours	5.3	4.7	3.4	3.1	3.0	2.4	2.8	3.6	4.6	4.4	4.2	4.8	3.9
Source: Instituto de Hidrologia Meteorologia y Estudios Ambientales
