= Nátaga =

Coordinates: 2°33′N 75°50′W

- Municipality and town
- Flag Coat of arms

- Location of the municipality and town of Nataga in the Huila Department of Colombia.
- Country: Colombia
- Department: Huila Department
- Time zone: UTC-5 (Colombia Standard Time)
- Website: http://www.nataga-huila.gov.co/

Nátaga (Spanish pronunciation: [ˈnataɣa]) is a town and municipality in the Huila Department, Colombia.
