= Huila Department =

Department of Colombia

Department of Huila Departamento del Huila
- Department
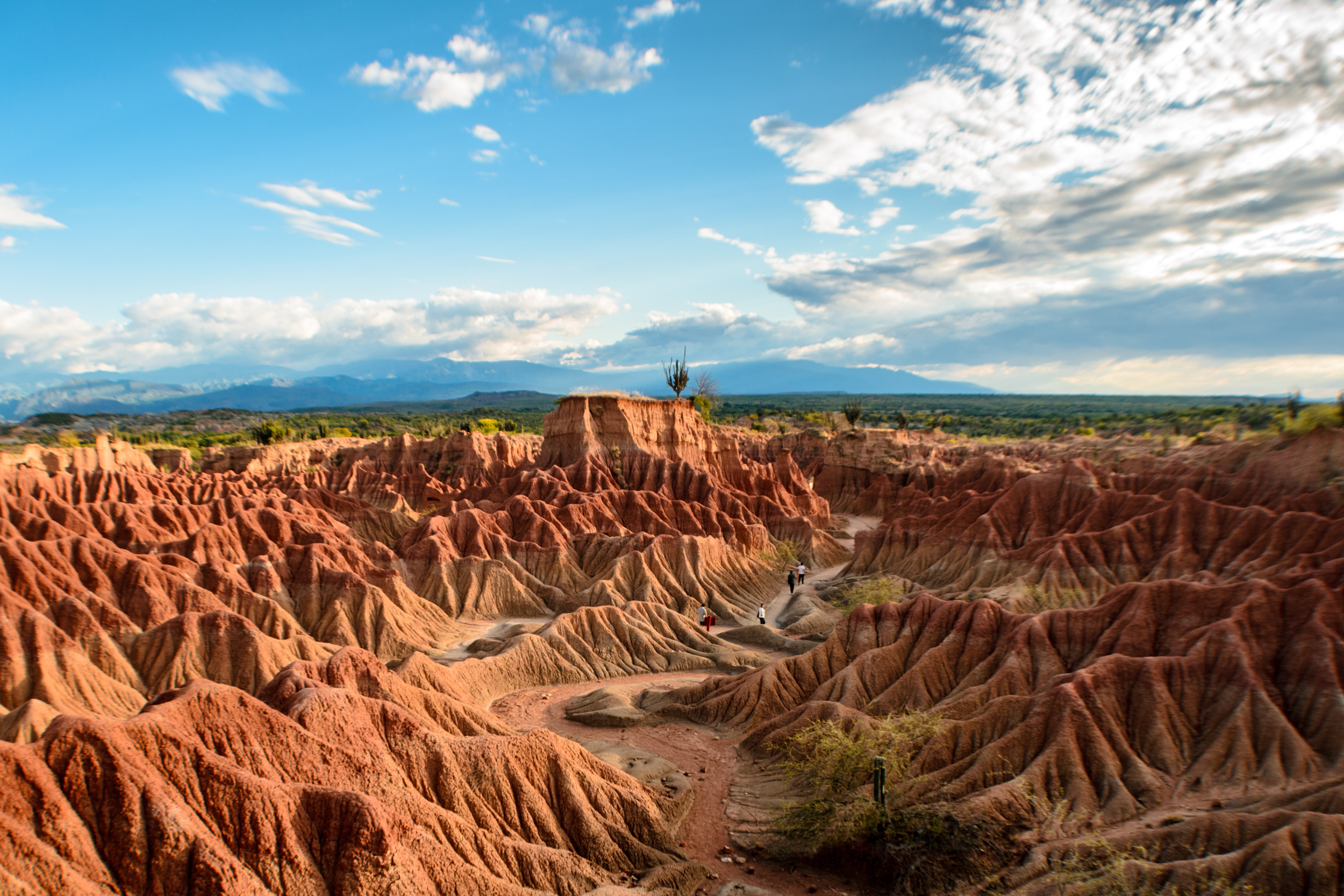
- The Tatacoa Desert

- Flag Coat of arms
- Anthem: Alma del Huila (Huila's soul)
- Huila shown in red

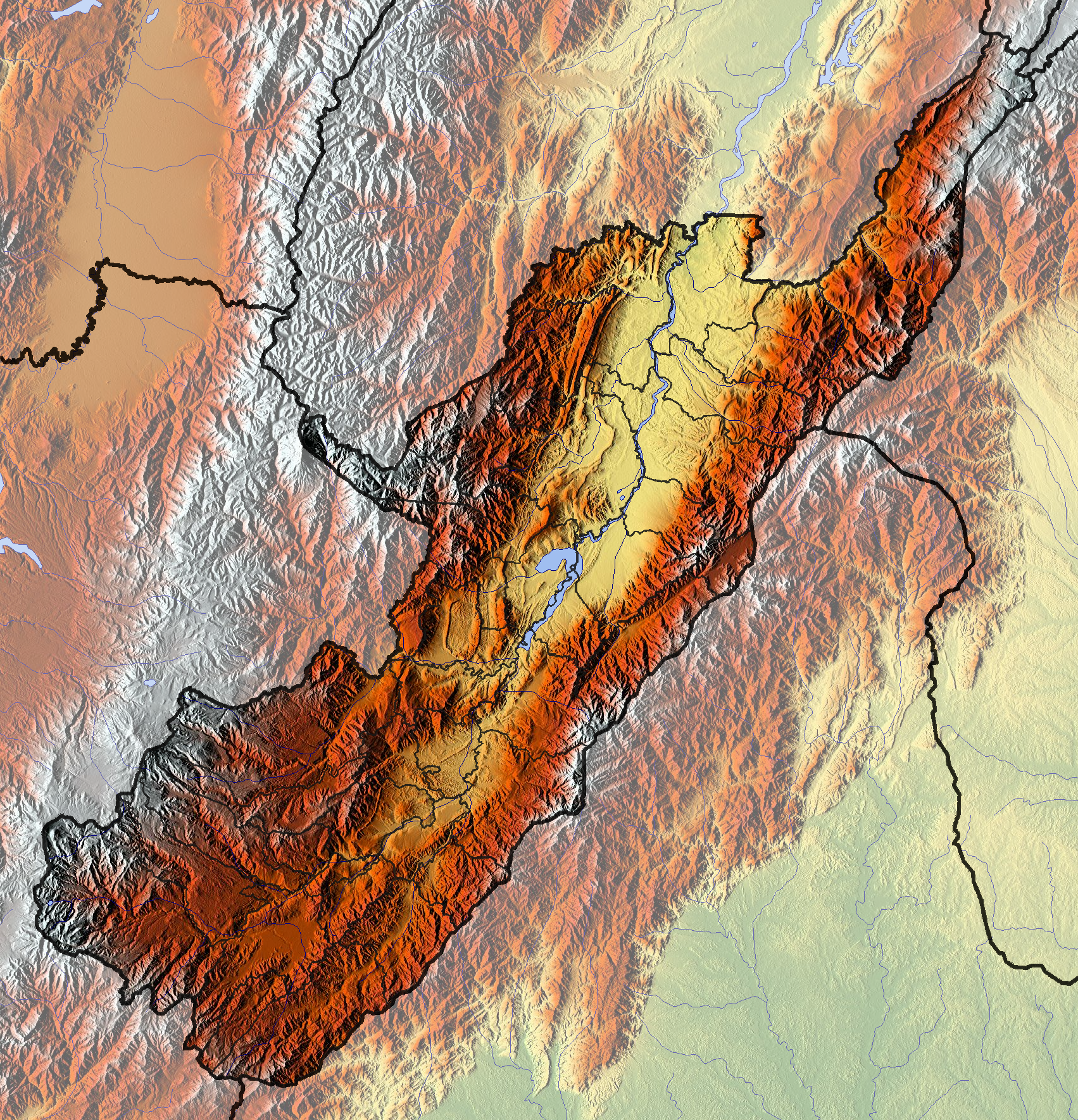
- Topography of the department
- Coordinates: 2°59′55″N 75°18′16″W
- Country: Colombia
- Region: Andean Region
- Department established: 1905
- Province established: 1610
- Capital: Neiva

Government
  - Governor: Luis Enrique Dussán López

Area
  - Total: 19,890 km^{2} (7,680 sq mi)
  - Rank: 26th

Population (2018)
  - Total: 1,200,386
  - Rank: 15th
  - Density: 60.35/km^{2} (156.3/sq mi)

GDP
  - Total: COP 24,012 billion (US$ 5.6 billion)
- Time zone: UTC-05
- ISO 3166 code: CO-HUI
- Provinces: 4
- Municipalities: 37
- HDI: 0.745 high · 23rd of 33
- Website: https://www.huila.gov.co/

Huila (Spanish pronunciation: [ˈwila]) is one of the departments of Colombia. It is located in the southwest of the country, and its capital is Neiva.

== Demography and Ethnography ==
Huila department had a population of 1,122,622 inhabitants in 2020, of which 679,667 (60.54%) live in urban areas and 442,955 (39.46%) in the rest of the Huilense territory. This amounts to 2.5% of the total Colombian population. The majority of it is settled in the Magdalena valley, the main urban centers being Neiva and Garzón, due to the possibilities offered by commercial-type agricultural economy, oil production, access to basic public services and roads connected to the central road axis along the Magdalena. The rest of the population is located on the coffee belt, standing out Pitalito and La Plata; the North Subregion is undergoing a decrease in its rural population, mainly attributable to alterations of agricultural and oil activities on the landscape. The average population density in the department is 59.88 inhabitants / km^{2}, with the highest densities in Neiva (223.72), Pitalito (200.1) and Garzón (162.45), and with the lowest in the municipalities of Colombia and Villavieja (7.83 and 10.91 respectively).

=== Ethnography ===
According to DANE, the racial composition of Huila is as follows: 98.43% recognize themselves as Whites and Mestizos, while only 1.57% as an ethnic population (Amerindians and Afro/Mulattos). This makes it one of departments with the highest percentage of non-ethnic affiliated population in the country.

== Geography ==
Historical population
Year	Pop.	±%
1973	467,651	—
1985	693,712	+48.3%
1993	843,798	+21.6%
2005	1,011,418	+19.9%
2018	1,100,386	+8.8%

According to the Agustín Codazzi Geographic Institute (IGAC), Huila's surface area is 19,890 km^{2} (7,680 sq mi), which is about 1.74% of the total surface area of Colombia.

The south of the department is located in the Colombian Massif. The Cordillera Oriental branches off from the Colombia Massif here. This is caused by the rise of the Magdalena River (also called Yuma River), Colombia's longest river and its largest basin. The Magdalena River has two large dams: Betania and El Quimbo.

Colombia's third highest peak, Nevado del Huila volcano, is also located in this department.

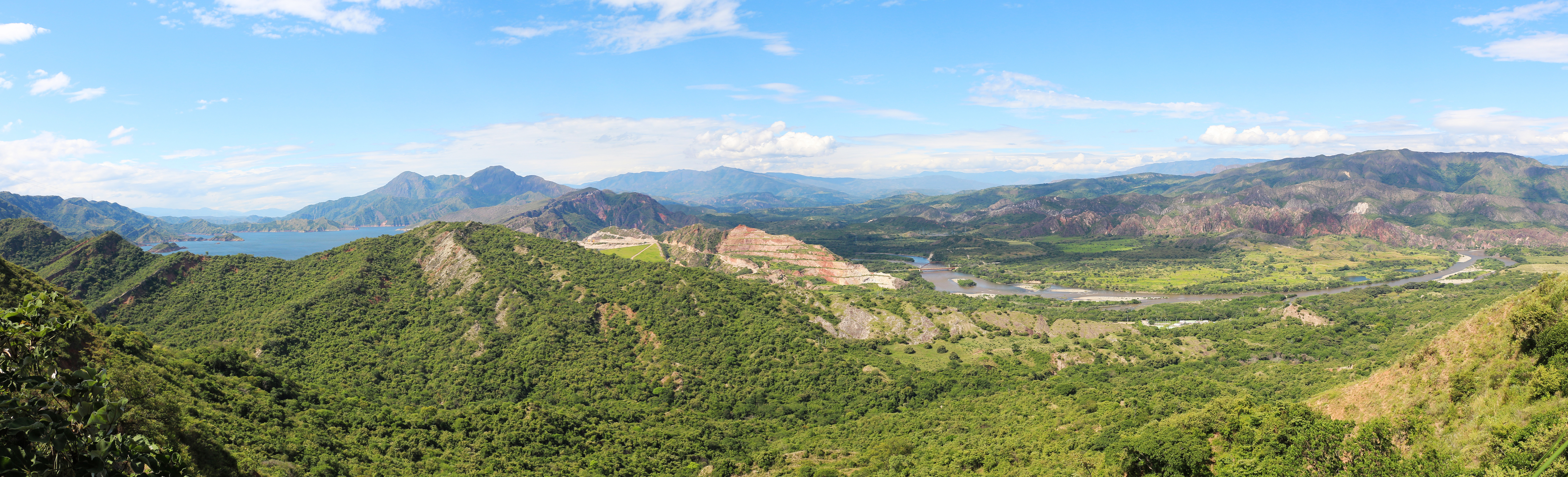
Landscape near Gigante

== Administrative divisions ==
=== Municipalities ===
- Acevedo
- Agrado
- Aipe
- Algeciras
- Altamira
- Baraya
- Campoalegre
- Colombia
- Elías
- Garzón
- Gigante
- Guadalupe
- Hobo
- Iquira
- Isnos
- La Argentina
- La Plata
- Nátaga
- Neiva (capital city)
- Oporapa
- Paicol
- Palermo
- Palestina
- Pital
- Pitalito
- Rivera
- Saladoblanco
- San Agustín
- Santa María
- Suaza
- Tarqui
- Tello
- Teruel
- Tesalia
- Timaná
- Villavieja
- Yaguará
