= Saladoblanco =

Coordinates: 2°01′N 76°03′W

- Municipality and town
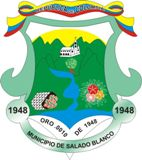
- Flag Coat of arms

- Location of the municipality and town of Saladoblanco in the Huila Department of Colombia.
- Country: Colombia
- Department: Huila Department

Area
  - Total: 290 km^{2} (110 sq mi)

Population (Census 2018)
  - Total: 10,076
  - Density: 35/km^{2} (90/sq mi)
- Time zone: UTC-5 (Colombia Standard Time)

Saladoblanco (Spanish pronunciation: [salaðoˈβlaŋko]) is a town and municipality in the Huila Department, Colombia.
