= Timaná =

Coordinates: 1°59′N 75°57′W

Timaná Villa de San Calixto Villa de La Gaitana
- Municipality and town
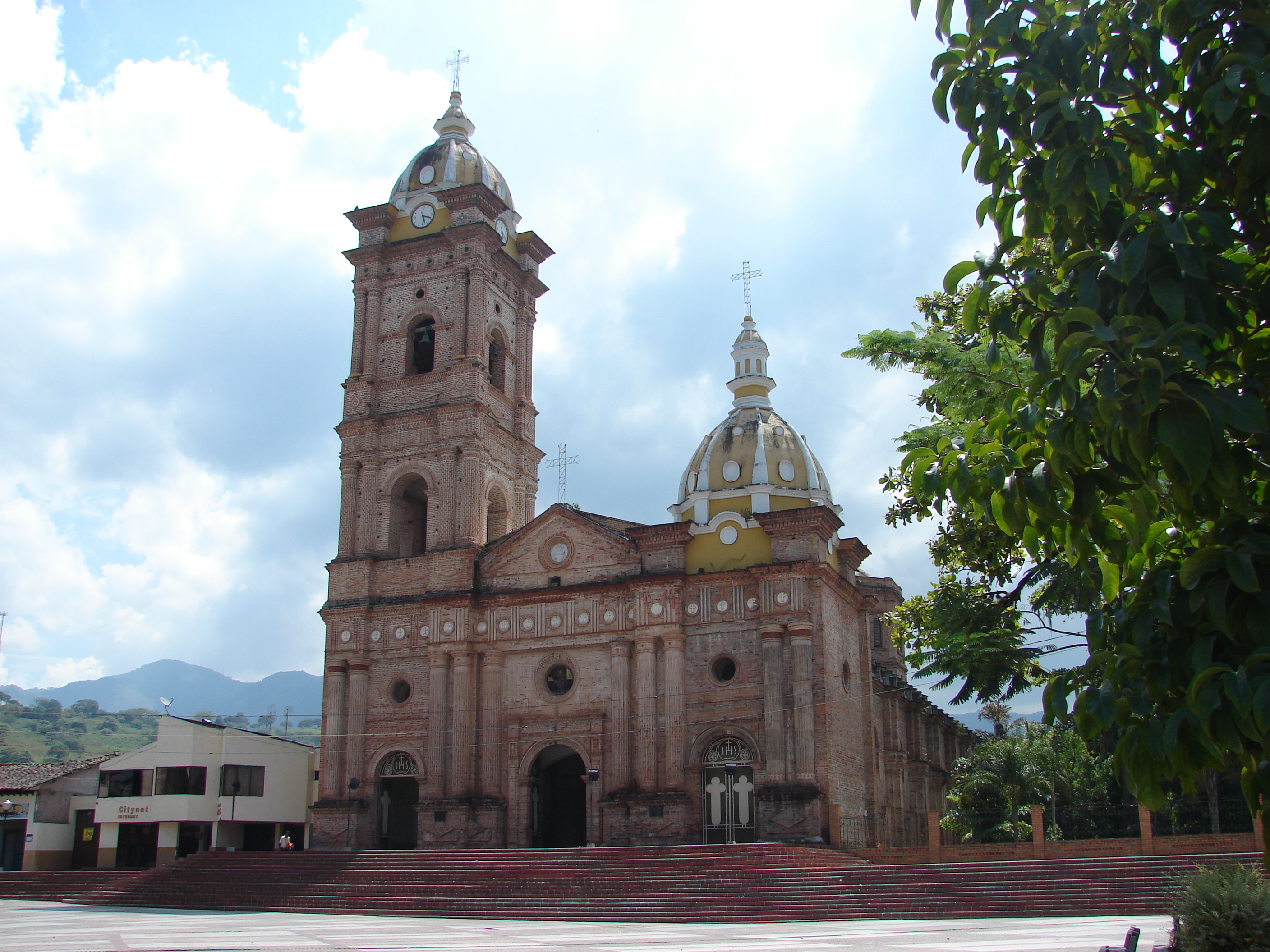
- Church of Timaná

- Flag Coat of arms

- Location of the municipality and town of Timana in the Huila Department of Colombia
- Country: Colombia
- Department: Huila Department
- Founded: 18 December 1538
- Founder: Pedro de Añasco

Government
  - Mayor: Juan Bautista Rojas Parra (2016-2019)

Area
  - Municipality and town: 182.5 km^{2} (70.5 sq mi)
  - Urban: 1.8 km^{2} (0.69 sq mi)
- Elevation: 1,100 m (3,600 ft)

Population (2015)
  - Municipality and town: 20,315
  - Density: 111.3/km^{2} (288.3/sq mi)
  - Urban: 7,321
- Time zone: UTC-5 (Colombia Standard Time)
- Website: Official website

Timaná is a town and municipality in the Huila Department, Colombia. The municipality is located in the south of Huila at an altitude of 1,100 metres (3,600 ft) and 166 kilometres (103 mi) southwest of the capital Neiva.

== History ==
The region of Timaná before the conquest in Colombia was inhabited by the Timana, bordered to the north by the Yalcón and farther north, the Paez and Pijao.

Modern Timaná was founded on December 18, 1538 by Pedro de Añasco, soldier in the army of Sebastián de Belalcázar.
