= Elías, Huila =

Coordinates: 2°01′N 75°56′W

Elias
- Municipality and town
- Flag Coat of arms

- Location of the municipality and town of Elias in the Huila Department of Colombia.
- Country: Colombia
- Department: Huila Department
- Time zone: UTC-5 (Colombia Standard Time)
- Website: http://www.elias-huila.gov.co/

Elias (also known as La Mesa de Elias) is a small town located in the southern part of the Huila Department.
