= Palestina, Huila =

Coordinates: 1.75°N 76.0667°W

- Municipality and town
- Flag Coat of arms

- Location of the municipality and town of Palestina, Huila in the Huila Department of Colombia.
- Country: Colombia
- Department: Huila Department

Area
  - Total: 220 km^{2} (85 sq mi)

Population (Census 2018)
  - Total: 10,454
  - Density: 48/km^{2} (120/sq mi)
- Time zone: UTC-5 (Colombia Standard Time)

Palestina is a town and municipality in the Huila Department, Colombia.
