= Tesalia =

Coordinates: 2°29′N 75°44′W

- Municipality and town
- Flag Coat of arms

- Location of the municipality and town of Tesalia in the Huila Department of Colombia.
- Country: Colombia
- Department: Huila Department

Area
  - Total: 502 km^{2} (194 sq mi)
- Elevation: 830 m (2,720 ft)

Population (Census 2018)
  - Total: 9,767
  - Density: 19.5/km^{2} (50.4/sq mi)
- Time zone: UTC-5 (Colombia Standard Time)

Tesalia (Spanish pronunciation: [teˈsalja]) is a town and municipality in the Huila Department, Colombia.
