= Altamira, Huila =

Coordinates: 2.06278°N 75.7872°W

- Municipality and town
- Flag Coat of arms

- Location of the municipality and town of Altamira, Huila in the Córdoba Department of Colombia.
- Country: Colombia
- Department: Huila Department
- Founded: October 18, 1855

Government
  - Mayor: Efraín Calderón Londoño

Area
  - Municipality and town: 188.18 km^{2} (72.66 sq mi)
- Elevation: 1,080 m (3,540 ft)

Population (2015)
  - Municipality and town: 4,293
  - Density: 188.18/km^{2} (487.4/sq mi)
  - Urban: 2,901
- Time zone: UTC-5 (Colombia Standard Time)

Altamira is a town and municipality in the Huila Department, Colombia.

Altamira is a small pueblo in the department Huila, with a population around 2,416. Its geographical coordinates are 2° 3' 46" North, 75° 47' 14" West. It is about an 8-hour bus trip south of Bogota. The largest city in Huila and its capital is Neiva, which is 89 miles north, with a population of about 370,000. The highway is two lane and paved. It is located in the Eastern Range of the Andes Mountains at about 3,540 feet elevation. The Central Range of the Andes converges in this part of the country so the mountains of that range can be seen just north of the town. On a very clear day when there are no high altitude clouds obscuring the view, the volcano Nevado de Huila can be seen to the north. At 5365 m (17601 ft) tall, it is the highest volcano in the country and is permanently snow covered with a glacier and it stands out well on a clear day even though it is about 50 miles north of Altamira.

About a half hour ride north is Garzon, the closest city to Altamira. An hours drive south of town is the larger city of Pitalito(69,000). The highways are paved two lane and very winding and steep in parts. It is also the nearest city to San Agustin where an archeological park is located that is known for its pre-Columbian statues and artifacts. A lesser known archeological site with similar artifacts is in the vicinity of the little town of Isnos.

The Rio Magdalina runs through the valley north of town and can be accessed at the little pueblo of Tarqui a short ride west and then north of the highway on a gravel road, or at the pueblo of La Jagua to the north. There is a school including primary and secondary located on the centro parque, where the church of San Roque is also located. There is a playground with soccer and basketball court at the west end of town with a swimming pool which is open every afternoon throughout the year.

Many tropical fruits are grown locally including mangoes, papayas, oranges, bananas, and pineapples. There are numerous vineyards between Altamira and Garzon and rice is grown north of Garzon. Coffee is extensively grown in the surrounding mountains.

In the mountains and valleys surrounding Altamira there are numerous pueblos and tiny settlements known as veredas that can be reached by gravel roads. There is a statue of Our Lady of Aranzazu in a small church in the tiny pueblo of Gallardo in the mountains above Suaza which is south of Altamira.

== Climate ==
Climate data for Altamira (1981–2010)
Month	Jan	Feb	Mar	Apr	May	Jun	Jul	Aug	Sep	Oct	Nov	Dec	Year
Mean daily maximum °C (°F)	27.7 (81.9)	28.1 (82.6)	27.8 (82.0)	27.5 (81.5)	27.4 (81.3)	26.7 (80.1)	26.0 (78.8)	26.5 (79.7)	27.7 (81.9)	27.7 (81.9)	27.1 (80.8)	27.2 (81.0)	27.3 (81.1)
Daily mean °C (°F)	23.4 (74.1)	23.4 (74.1)	23.2 (73.8)	23.2 (73.8)	23.0 (73.4)	22.5 (72.5)	21.9 (71.4)	22.4 (72.3)	22.9 (73.2)	22.9 (73.2)	23.0 (73.4)	23.1 (73.6)	22.9 (73.2)
Mean daily minimum °C (°F)	18.1 (64.6)	18.2 (64.8)	18.1 (64.6)	18.2 (64.8)	18.3 (64.9)	17.9 (64.2)	17.4 (63.3)	17.4 (63.3)	17.6 (63.7)	17.8 (64.0)	18.2 (64.8)	18.2 (64.8)	18.0 (64.4)
Average precipitation mm (inches)	81.7 (3.22)	104.8 (4.13)	116.4 (4.58)	112.6 (4.43)	116.7 (4.59)	79.0 (3.11)	66.1 (2.60)	40.2 (1.58)	54.9 (2.16)	106.6 (4.20)	127.5 (5.02)	86.5 (3.41)	1,093.1 (43.04)
Average precipitation days	12	14	17	18	20	17	18	16	15	18	18	15	195
Average relative humidity (%)	75	76	78	78	78	77	78	75	73	76	78	78	77
Mean monthly sunshine hours	170.5	132.7	120.9	120.0	145.7	135.0	124.0	124.0	135.0	148.8	147.0	173.6	1,677.2
Mean daily sunshine hours	5.5	4.7	3.9	4.0	4.7	4.5	4.0	4.0	4.5	4.8	4.9	5.6	4.6
Source: Instituto de Hidrologia Meteorologia y Estudios Ambientales

Climate data for Altamira (Altamira El Grifo), elevation 1,368 m (4,488 ft), (1981–2010)
Month	Jan	Feb	Mar	Apr	May	Jun	Jul	Aug	Sep	Oct	Nov	Dec	Year
Mean daily maximum °C (°F)	26.7 (80.1)	26.7 (80.1)	26.0 (78.8)	25.5 (77.9)	25.1 (77.2)	24.3 (75.7)	24.2 (75.6)	24.6 (76.3)	25.8 (78.4)	26.2 (79.2)	25.7 (78.3)	25.8 (78.4)	25.6 (78.1)
Daily mean °C (°F)	21.6 (70.9)	21.7 (71.1)	21.2 (70.2)	21.0 (69.8)	20.6 (69.1)	20.0 (68.0)	19.8 (67.6)	20.1 (68.2)	20.8 (69.4)	21.1 (70.0)	21.0 (69.8)	21.0 (69.8)	20.8 (69.4)
Mean daily minimum °C (°F)	17.6 (63.7)	17.7 (63.9)	17.6 (63.7)	17.4 (63.3)	17.1 (62.8)	16.7 (62.1)	16.5 (61.7)	16.6 (61.9)	17.1 (62.8)	17.5 (63.5)	17.4 (63.3)	17.5 (63.5)	17.2 (63.0)
Average precipitation mm (inches)	73.2 (2.88)	113.1 (4.45)	127.0 (5.00)	136.4 (5.37)	153.9 (6.06)	107.4 (4.23)	80.7 (3.18)	51.6 (2.03)	70.9 (2.79)	138.2 (5.44)	134.8 (5.31)	86.9 (3.42)	1,274 (50.16)
Average relative humidity (%)	75	74	77	78	78	78	76	74	71	74	78	77	76
Mean monthly sunshine hours	164.3	135.5	114.7	120.0	127.1	132.0	136.4	148.8	135.0	142.6	138.0	161.2	1,655.6
Mean daily sunshine hours	5.3	4.8	3.7	4.0	4.1	4.4	4.4	4.8	4.5	4.6	4.6	5.2	4.5
Source: Instituto de Hidrologia Meteorologia y Estudios Ambientales
