= Pital, Huila =

Coordinates: 2.987°N 75.826°W

Pital
- Municipality and town
- Flag Seal

- Location of the municipality and town of Pital in the Huila Department of Colombia.
- Country: Colombia
- Department: Huila Department

Area
  - Total: 210 km^{2} (81 sq mi)

Population (Census 2018)
  - Total: 12,246
  - Density: 58/km^{2} (150/sq mi)
- Time zone: UTC-5 (Colombia Standard Time)

Pital is a town and municipality in the Huila Department, Colombia.
