= Acevedo, Huila =

Coordinates: 1.81917°N 75.8964°W

- Municipality and town
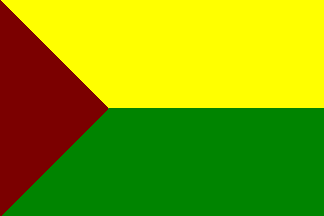
- Flag Coat of arms

- Location of the municipality and town of Acevedo, Huila in the Córdoba Department of Colombia.
- Country: Colombia
- Department: Huila Department

Population (2020 est.)
  - Total: 36,649
- Time zone: UTC-5 (Colombia Standard Time)

Acevedo (Spanish pronunciation: [aseˈβeðo]) is a town and municipality in the Huila Department, Colombia.
