= Isnos =

Coordinates: 1°56′N 76°14′W

- Municipality and town
- Flag Coat of arms

- Location of the municipality and town of Isnos in the Huila Department of Colombia.
- Country: Colombia
- Department: Huila Department

Population (Census 2018)
  - Total: 24,593
- Time zone: UTC-5 (Colombia Standard Time)

Isnos is a town and municipality in the Huila Department, Colombia. This region was struck with a M7.3 earthquake on 30 September 2012. Isnos was recognized and declared by UNESCO in 1995 as a Cultural and Historical Heritage.
