= Paicol =

- Municipality and town
- Flag Coat of arms

- Location of the municipality and town of Paicol in the Huila Department of Colombia.
- Coordinates: 2°26′59″N 75°46′26″W
- Country: Colombia
- Department: Huila Department
- Time zone: UTC-5 (Colombia Standard Time)

Paicol is a town and municipality in the Huila Department, Colombia.
