= San Agustín, Huila =

Coordinates: 1°54′N 76°17′W

- Municipality and town
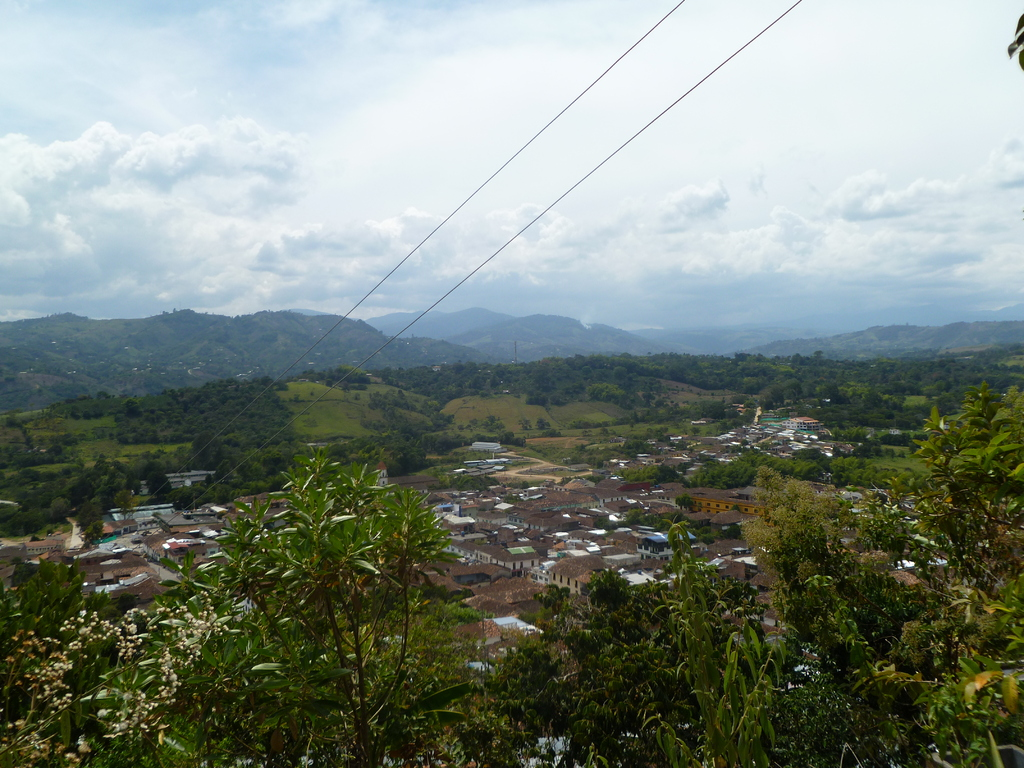

- Flag Coat of arms

- Location of the municipality and town of San Agustín, Córdoba in the Huila Department of Colombia.
- Country: Colombia
- Department: Huila Department
- Established: 20 November 1790

Population (2020 est.)
  - Total: 34,420
- Time zone: UTC-5 (Colombia Standard Time)

San Agustín (Spanish pronunciation: [san aɣusˈtin]) is a town and municipality in the southern Colombian Department of Huila. The town is located 227 km away from the capital of the department, Neiva. Population is around 34,000. The village was founded in 1752 by Alejo Astudillo but attacks by indigenous people destroyed it. The present village was founded in 1790 by Lucas de Herazo y Mendigaña.

The mean temperature year round is 18 °C.

== Climate ==
San Agustín has a subtropical highland climate (Köppen: Cfb) with warm temperatures and frequent rainfall.

Climate data for San Agustín (Parque Arqueologic), elevation 1,800 m (5,900 ft), (1981–2010)
Month	Jan	Feb	Mar	Apr	May	Jun	Jul	Aug	Sep	Oct	Nov	Dec	Year
Mean daily maximum °C (°F)	23.9 (75.0)	24.0 (75.2)	23.5 (74.3)	23.3 (73.9)	22.8 (73.0)	21.8 (71.2)	21.0 (69.8)	21.6 (70.9)	22.8 (73.0)	23.5 (74.3)	23.5 (74.3)	23.6 (74.5)	22.9 (73.2)
Daily mean °C (°F)	18.7 (65.7)	18.8 (65.8)	18.7 (65.7)	18.6 (65.5)	18.3 (64.9)	17.6 (63.7)	17.0 (62.6)	17.2 (63.0)	17.9 (64.2)	18.4 (65.1)	18.5 (65.3)	18.5 (65.3)	18.2 (64.8)
Mean daily minimum °C (°F)	13.9 (57.0)	14.1 (57.4)	14.3 (57.7)	14.4 (57.9)	14.3 (57.7)	13.8 (56.8)	13.2 (55.8)	13.0 (55.4)	13.2 (55.8)	13.8 (56.8)	14.1 (57.4)	14.0 (57.2)	13.8 (56.8)
Average precipitation mm (inches)	88.0 (3.46)	101.6 (4.00)	127.9 (5.04)	157.0 (6.18)	147.7 (5.81)	154.6 (6.09)	137.9 (5.43)	103.8 (4.09)	92.7 (3.65)	119.3 (4.70)	141.0 (5.55)	117.2 (4.61)	1,488.8 (58.61)
Average precipitation days	16	17	20	23	24	24	24	23	21	21	21	19	250
Average relative humidity (%)	78	78	79	81	82	83	83	81	79	79	81	80	80
Mean monthly sunshine hours	158.1	127.0	111.6	111.0	124.0	108.0	108.5	117.8	129.0	139.5	141.0	158.1	1,533.6
Mean daily sunshine hours	5.1	4.5	3.6	3.7	4.0	3.6	3.5	3.8	4.3	4.5	4.7	5.1	4.2
Source: Instituto de Hidrologia Meteorologia y Estudios Ambientales

== San Agustín Archaeological Park ==
The area is very well known for its pre-Columbian archaeological sites belonging to the ancient San Agustin culture. These sites comprise the San Agustín Archaeological Park, which generates significant revenue to the economy due to the high volume of tourists, both Colombian and foreigners. This site was declared a UNESCO World Heritage Site in 1995.

== Gallery ==
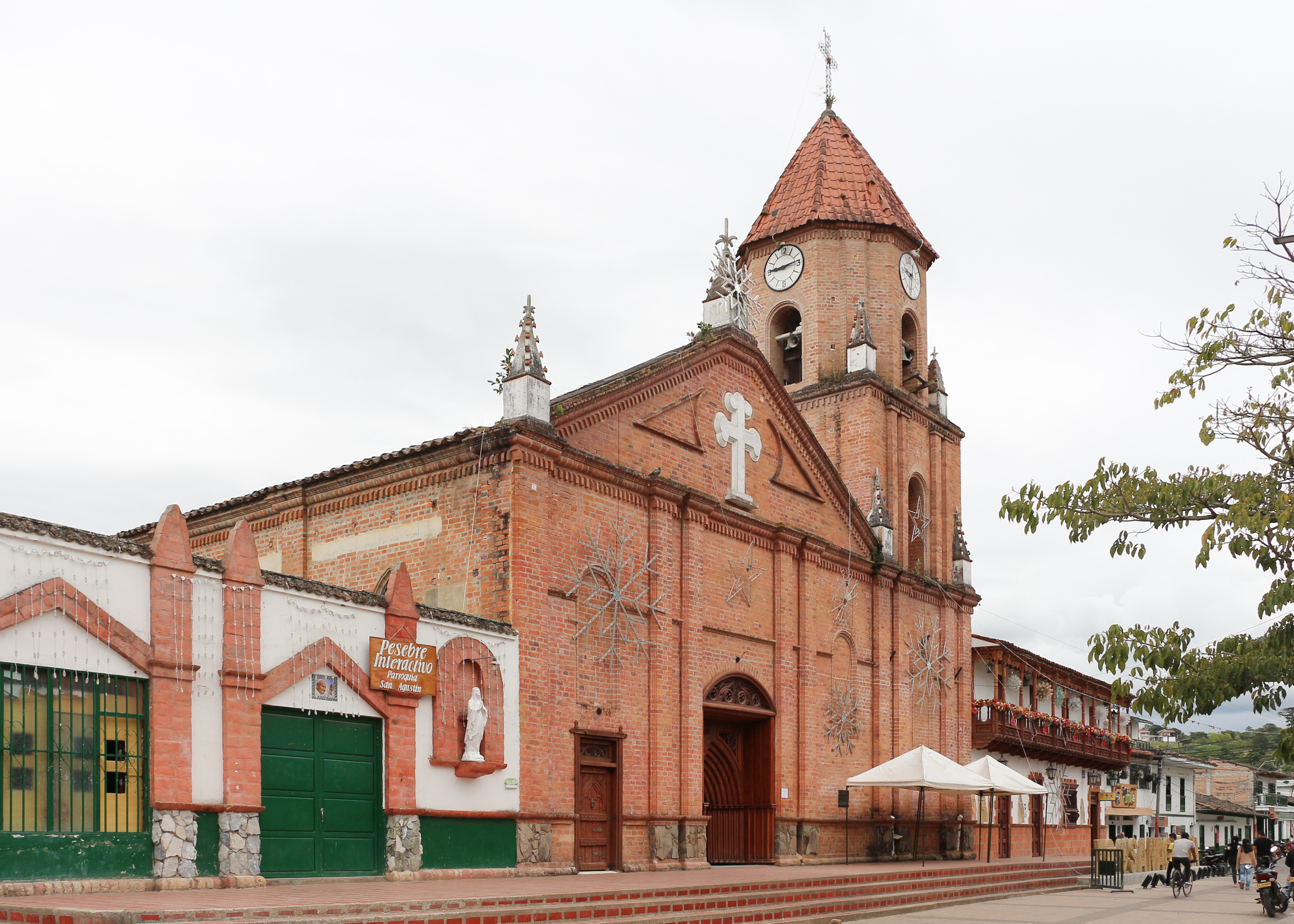
Church of San Agustín

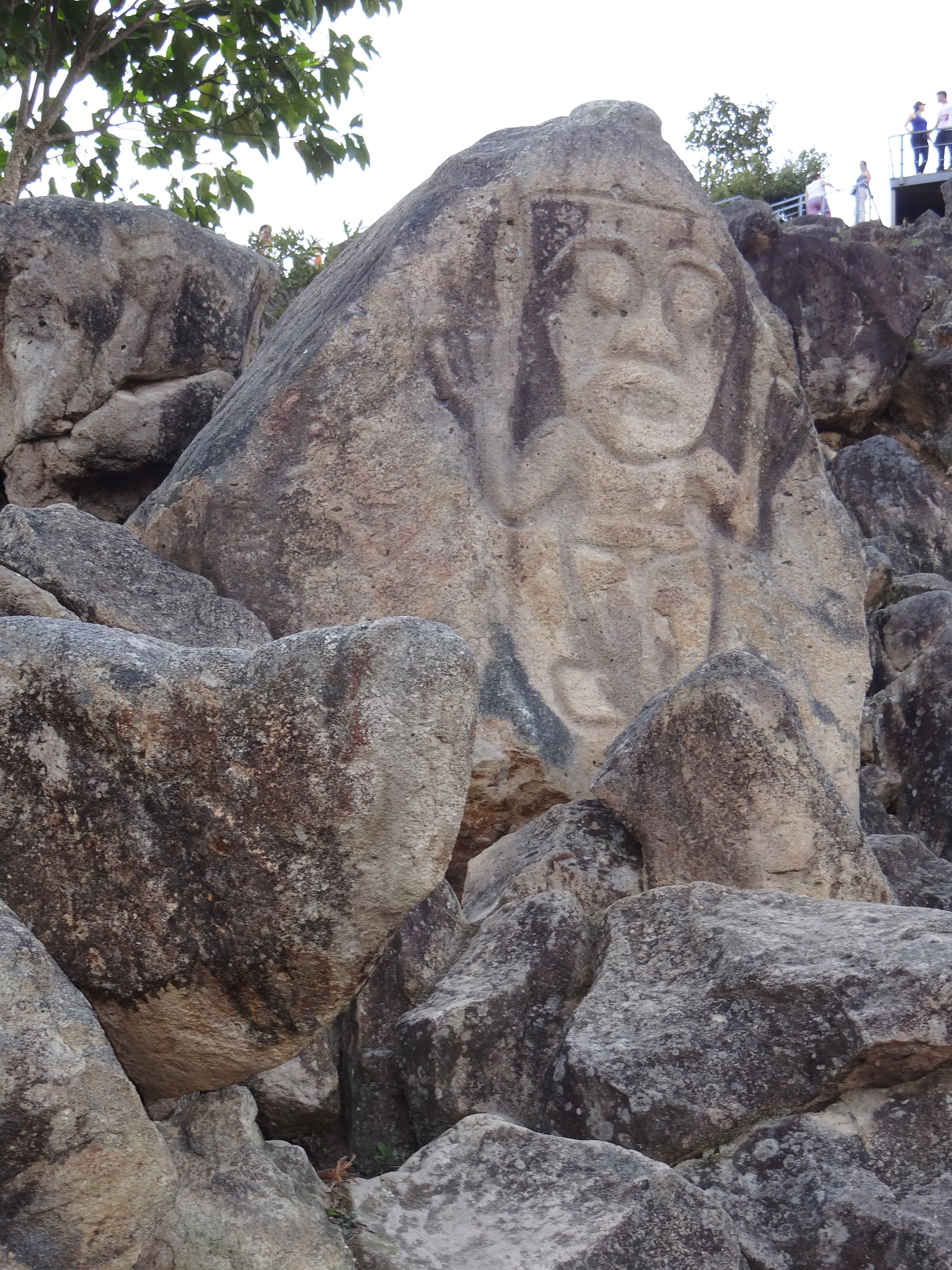
Stone carving

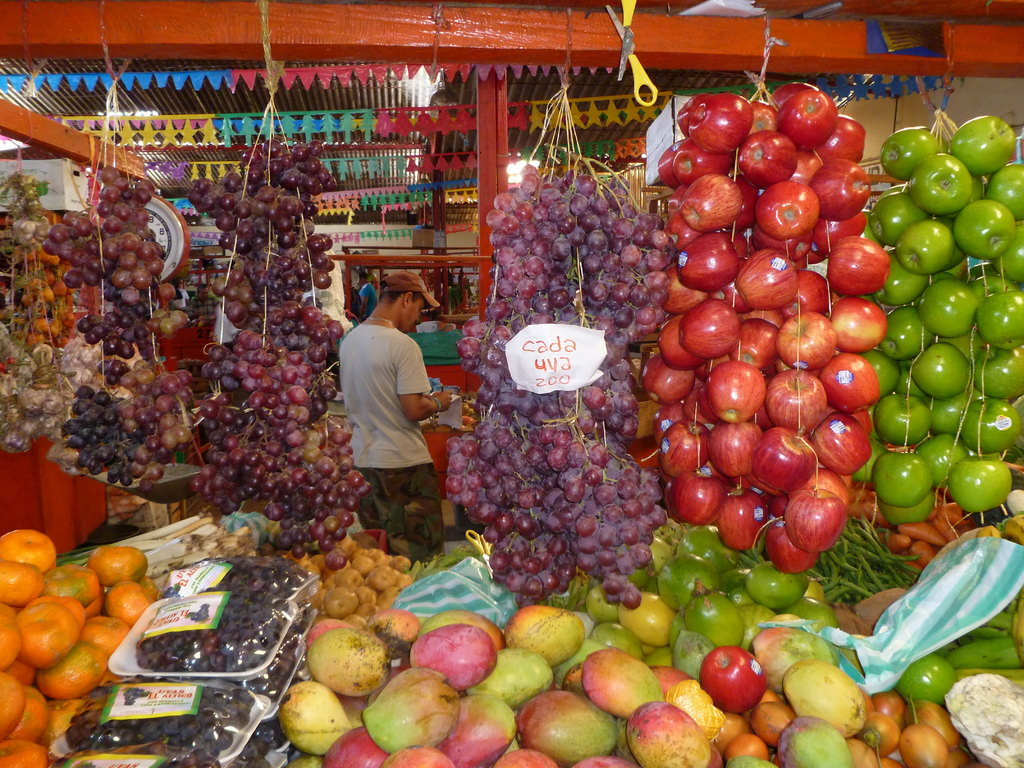
Market

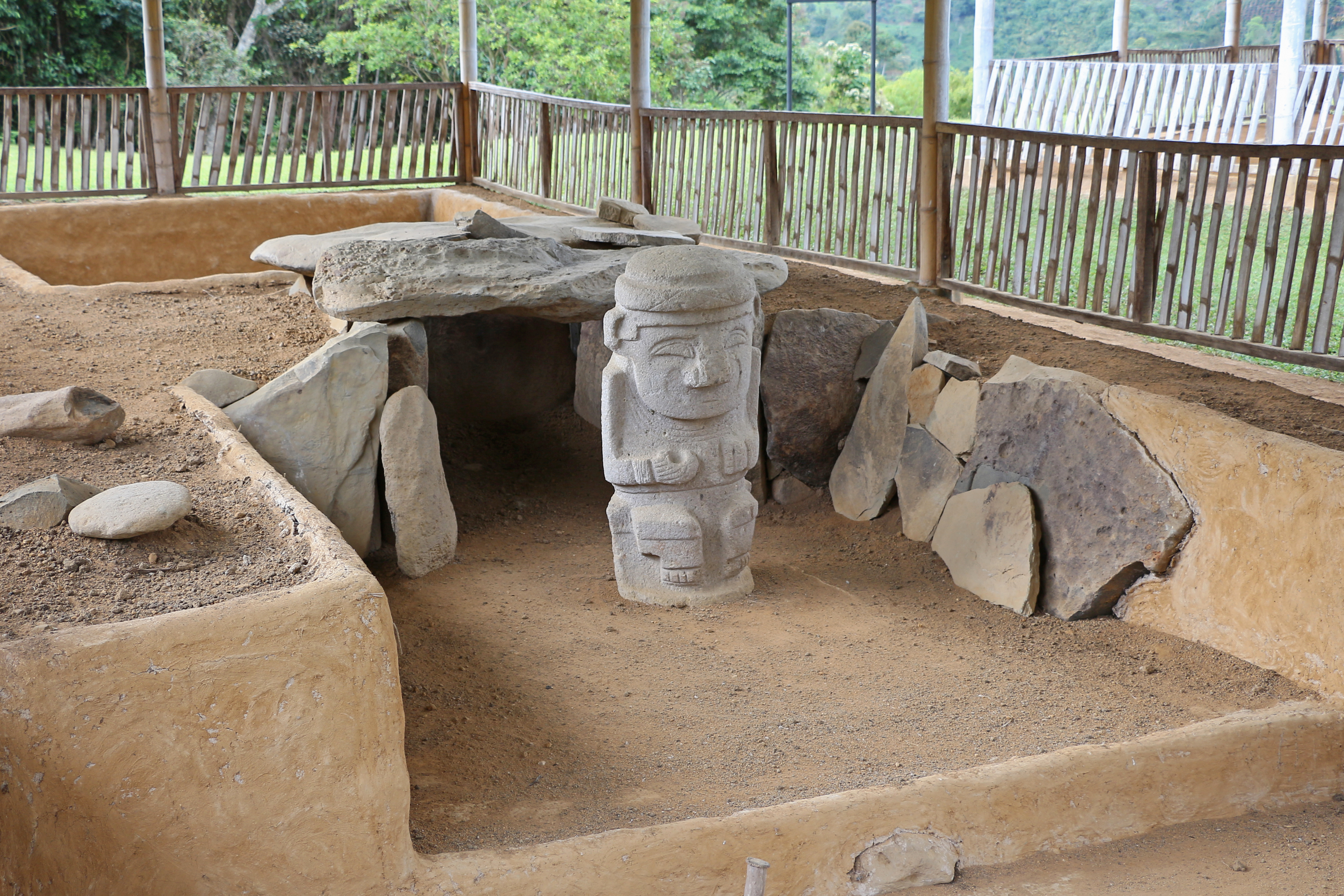
San Agustín Archaeological Park

== See also ==
- List of megalithic sites
