= List of pre-Columbian cultures =

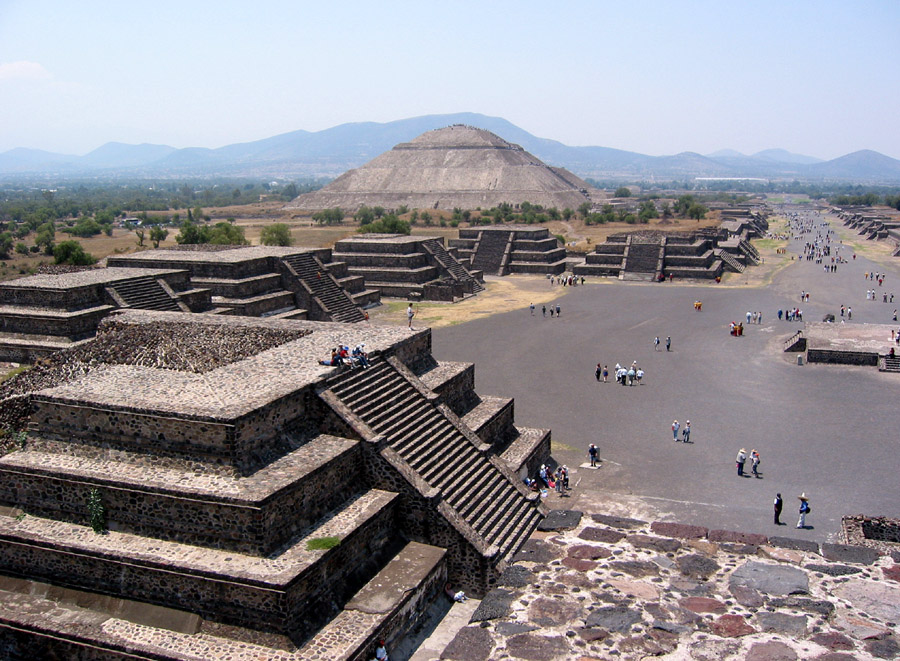
Pyramid of the Sun and Avenue of The Dead, viewed from the top of Pyramid of the Moon, Teotihuacán, Mexico, 100–200 AD

This is a list of pre-Columbian cultures.

== Cultural characteristics ==
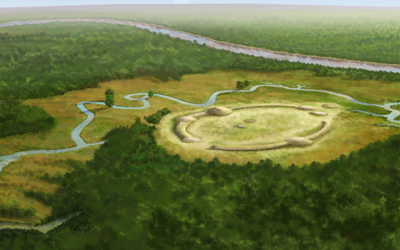
Watson Brake, Louisiana, 3500 BC

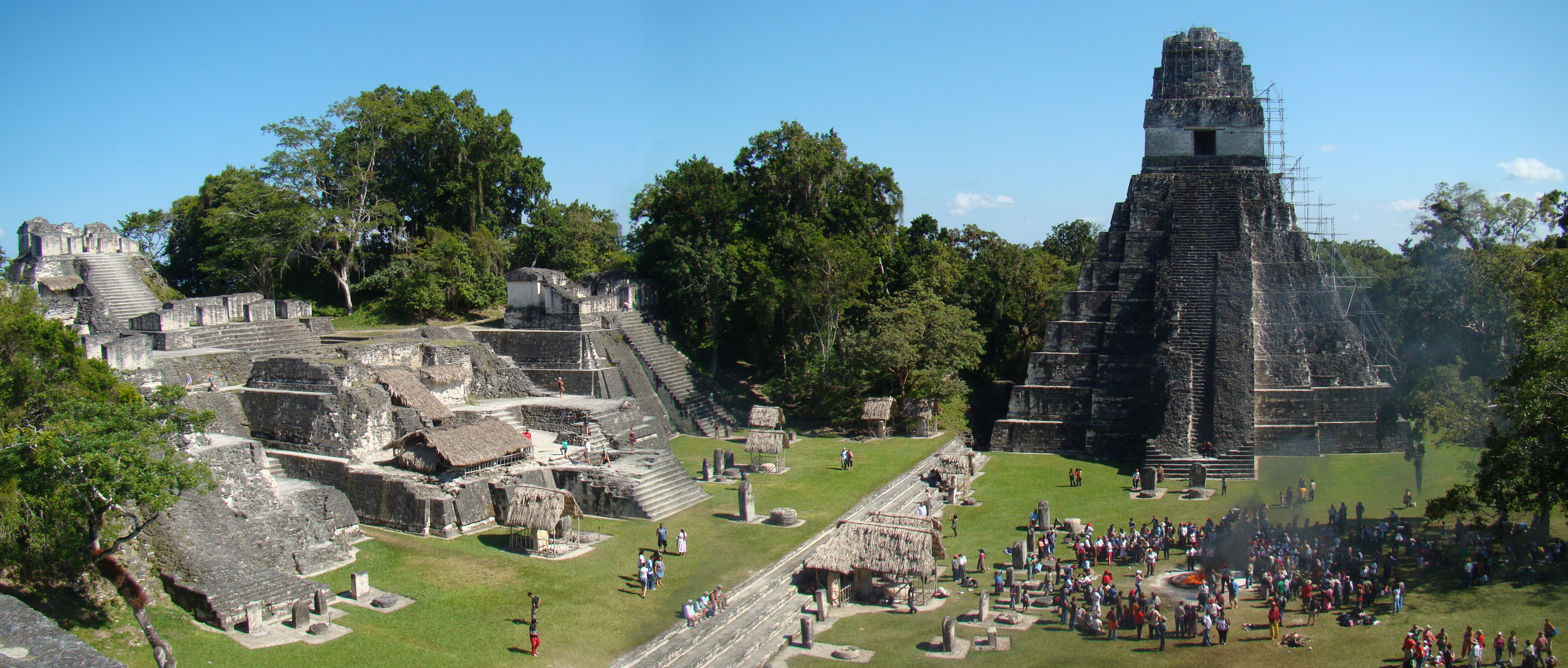
Tikal, Guatemala, Maya civilization.

Many pre-Columbian civilizations established permanent or urban settlements, agriculture, and complex societal hierarchies. In North America, indigenous cultures in the Lower Mississippi Valley during the Middle Archaic period built complexes of multiple mounds, with several in Louisiana dated to 5600–5000 BP (3700 BC–3100 BC). Watson Brake is considered the oldest, multiple mound complex in the Americas, as it has been dated to 3500 BC. It and other Middle Archaic sites were built by pre-ceramic, hunter-gatherer societies. They preceded the better known Poverty Point culture and its elaborate complex by nearly 2,000 years. The Mississippi Valley mound-building tradition extended into the Late Archaic period, longer than what later southeastern mound building dependent on sedentary, agricultural societies.(Russo, 1996:285)

Some of these civilizations had long ceased to function by the time of the first permanent European arrivals (c. late 15th – early 16th centuries), and are known only through archaeological investigations or oral history from nations today. Others were contemporary with this period, and are also known from historical accounts of the time. A few, such as the Olmec, Maya, Mixtec, and Nahua had their own written records. However, most Europeans of the time viewed such texts as heretical and burned most of them. Only a few documents were hidden and thus remain today, leaving modern historians with glimpses of ancient culture and knowledge.

From both indigenous American and European accounts and documents, American civilizations at the time of European encounter possessed many impressive attributes, having populous cities, and having developed theories of astronomy and mathematics.

Where they persist, the societies and cultures which gave rise to these civilizations continue to adapt and evolve; they also uphold various traditions and practices which relate back to these earlier times, even if combined with those more recently adopted.

Human sacrifice was a religious practice principally characteristic of pre-Columbian Aztec civilization, although other Mesoamerican civilizations like the Maya and the Zapotec practiced it as well. The extent of the practice is debated by modern scholars.

== Northern America ==
- Paleo-Indians, c. 18,000–8000 BC
  - Clovis
  - Folsom tradition
  - Plano cultures
  - Cody complex
- Archaic Period, 8000–1000 BC
  - Paleo-Arctic tradition, 8000–5000 BC, Alaska and Yukon
  - Watson Brake and Lower Mississippi Valley mounds sites, 3500 BC–2800 BC, Louisiana, Mississippi and Florida
  - Poverty Point culture, 2200 BC–700 BC, Lower Mississippi Valley and surrounding Gulf coast
- Post-archaic period, 1000 BC–onward
  - Southwest:
    - Ancestral Pueblo culture, 1200 BC–1300 AD, Utah, Arizona, Colorado, New Mexico—one of these cultural groups referred to as Anasazi
    - Fremont culture, 1 AD–1300 AD, Utah and parts of Nevada, Idaho and Colorado
    - Hohokam, 1 AD–1450 AD, Arizona
  - Eastern Woodlands
    - Woodland period, 1000 BC–1000 AD
      - Adena, 1000–200 BC, Ohio, Indiana, West Virginia, Kentucky, and parts of Pennsylvania and New York.
      - Hopewell culture, 200 BC–500 AD, Southeastern Canada and eastern United States
      - Troyville culture, 400–700 AD, Louisiana and Mississippi
      - Coles Creek culture, 700–1200 AD, Arkansas, Louisiana and Mississippi
      - Plum Bayou culture, 700–1200 AD, Arkansas
    - Mississippian culture, 800 AD–1730 AD, Midwestern, Eastern, and Southeastern United States
      - Caborn-Welborn culture, 1400–1700 AD, Indiana and Kentucky.
      - Caddoan Mississippian culture, 1000 AD–1650 AD, Eastern Oklahoma, Western Arkansas, Northeast Texas, and Northwest Louisiana.
      - Fort Walton Culture, 1100–1550 AD, Florida.
      - Leon-Jefferson Culture, 1100–1550 AD, Florida.
      - Plaquemine culture, 1200–1730 AD, Louisiana and Mississippi.
      - Upper Mississippian culture,
        - Fort Ancient, 1000 AD–1650 AD, Ohio, Kentucky, West Virginia
        - Oneota, 900–1650 AD, Iowa, Michigan, Minnesota and Missouri.

== Caribbean ==
- Lithic/Archaic Age, c. 5500—200 BC
  - Greater Antilles
    - Casimiroid culture, c. 5500—200 BC
    - Ciboney people, Greater Antilles, c. 1000—300 BC
      - Guanahatabey, Cuba, c. 1000 BC
  - Lesser Antilles
    - Ortoiroid culture, c. 5500—200 BC
    - Krum Bay culture, Virgin Islands, St. Thomas, c. 1500—200 BC
    - Coroso culture, Puerto Rico, c. 1000 BC–AD 200
- Early Ceramic Age, c. 500 BC—AD 600
  - Lesser Antilles to Puerto Rico
    - Saladoid culture, 500 BC—AD 600
      - Cedrosan Saladoid ceramics, 500 BC-AD 300
      - Saladoid-Barrancoid ceramics, AD 300-600
    - La Huecan culture, c. 500 BC—AD 600
      - Vieques, Puerto Rico
- Late Ceramic Age, c. AD 600-1500
  - Greater Antilles
    - Ostionoid culture, AD 600—1500
    - Taíno people
    - Lucayans, Greater Antilles and Bahamas 700 AD–1500 AD – group encountered by Columbus
  - Lesser Antilles
    - Troumassoid culture, c. AD 600-1500
      - Troumassan ceramics, AD 600-900
      - Suazan ceramics, AD 900-1500
        - Igneri, Dominica 500 AD, St. Croix 650 AD, Puerto Rico 1000 AD
- Linguistic/Non-Archaeological Denominations
  - Arawak people
  - Kalinago/"Carib"
  - Nepoya and Suppoya, Trinidad

== Mesoamerica ==
In alphabetical order:

- Aztec, 1325–1521 AD, central Mexico
- Chorotegas, 500-1530 AD, Nicaragua; Costa Rica
- Epi-Olmec culture, 300 BC-250 AD, Veracruz
- Formative Period, 2500 BC–200 AD, La Blanca, Ujuxte, Monte Alto Culture, Mokaya Culture
- Huastec, 1000 BC–1500 AD, Hidalgo, Veracruz, San Luis Potosí and Tamaulipas
- Lenca, unknown-1539 AD, Honduras and eastern El Salvador
- Maya, 2600 BC–1697 AD, Mexican Southern states: Chiapas, Tabasco, Campeche and Yucatán Peninsula; Central America: Belize; Guatemala; El Salvador; Honduras
- Mezcala, 700 BC-650 AD, Guerrero
- Mixe, 400–present
- Mixtec, unknown–1600 AD, western Oaxaca
- Nicarao people, 700-1622 AD, Nicaragua; Costa Rica
- Nicoya Kingdom, 500 BC-1524 AD, Costa Rica
- Olmec, 1500–400 BC, Veracruz and Tabasco
- Pipil people, c. 1200-1528 AD, El Salvador
- Purépecha Empire or Tarascan state, 1300–1530 AD, Michoacán
- Teotihuacán, 200 BC–800 AD, near Mexico City
- Teuchitlan tradition, 300 BC – 500 AD, north-central Jalisco
- Toltec, 900–1100 AD – may be mythical
- Totonac, unknown–1500 AD, eastern Mexico
- Western Mexico shaft tomb tradition, 1500–300 BC, Michoacan, Colima, Jalisco, Nayarit
- Western Mexico shaft tomb tradition, 300 BC–400 AD, Jalisco, Nayarit, and, to a lesser extent, Colima
- Zapotec, 500 BC–1500 AD, Oaxaca

== Isthmo-Colombian area ==
- Cueva people, ?–1530 AD, Panama
- Diquis culture, 700–1530 AD, Costa Rica
- Gran Coclé, 1200 BC-1500 AD, Panama
- Huetar people, ?-1600 AD, Costa Rica
- Miskito people, -1700 AD, Honduras; Nicaragua
- Mayangna people, 1700 AD, Nicaragua
- Cacaopera people, 1700 AD, El Salvador; Nicaragua

== South America ==
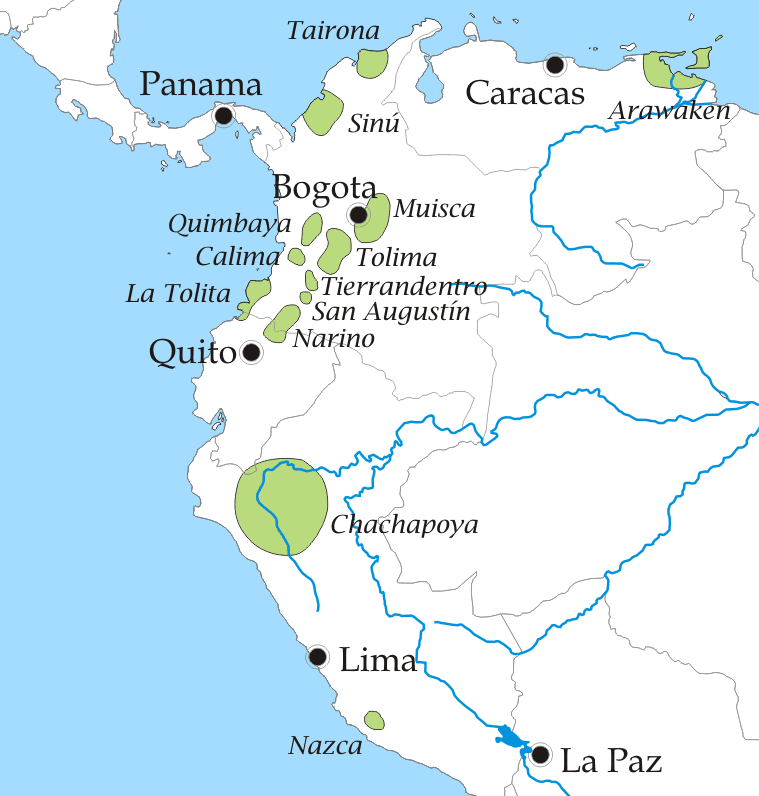
Early South American cultures

Period	Dates	Cultures
Ceramic
Late Horizon	1476 AD – 1534 AD	Ecuador, Peru, Bolivia, Argentina, Chile, and Colombia: Inca Empire; Brazil: Cambeba; Colombia: Muisca Confederation Argentina: Diaguita
Late Intermediate	1000 AD – 1476 AD	Bolivia: Aymara kingdoms; Colombia: Muisca, Capuli, Tairona; Ecuador: Los Huancavilca, Kingdom of Quito, Manteño, Capuli; Peru: Chimú, Chincha, Cajamarca, Chiribaya, Piura, Chancay, Chachapoyas, Chiribaya, Chucuito, Huaman Huilca, Ilo, Lupaca, Qotu Qotu, Pacacocha, Palli Marca, Piura, Sican, Tajaraca, Huaylas, Conchucos, Huamachuco, Rucanas, Chanka, Ayabaca, Bracamoros, Huancabambas, Tallan culture, Huarco, Ichma, Parinacota, Cuntis, Chinchaycochas, Huarochiri, Kheswas, Tarmas, Paltas, Camanas; Argentina: Diaguita
Middle Horizon	600 AD – 1000 AD	Bolivia: Tiwanaku (kin to Wari); Brazil: Marajoara culture; Colombia: Cauca culture, Herrera, Capuli, Quimbaya, Tairona; Ecuador: Cañari culture, Capuli; Peru: Chimu, Huari/Wari, Piura; Argentina: Diaguita
Early Intermediate	200 AD–600 AD	Bolivia: Tiwanaku; Colombia: Herrera, Quimbaya, San Agustín, Tairona, Tierradentro, Tolima; Ecuador (the Upano Valley): La Bahía, Cara, Quitu; Peru: Moche, Nazca, Lima, Pechiche, Piura
Early Horizon	900 BC–200 AD	Colombia: Calima culture (200 BC–400 AD), Herrera; Ecuador: Chorrera, La Tolita; Peru: Chavín, Cupisnique, Late Chiripa, Paracas, Pechiche, Sechura, Xakse
Initial Period	1800/1500 BC – 900 BC	Ecuador: Cotocollao; Machalilla; Peru: Early Chiripa, Kotosh, Chavín Toríl (The Cumbe Mayo aqueduct was built c. 1000 BC), Argentina: Tehuelches (?-1820)
Preceramic
Period VI	2500 BC – 1500/1800 BC	Ecuador: Valdivia; Peru: Casma/Sechin culture, Norte Chico (Caral), Buena Vista, Casavilca, Culebras, Ventarrón, Viscachani, Huaca Prieta; Peru, Chile: Chinchorro
Period V	4200 BC – 2500 BC	Ecuador: Valdivia; Peru: Casma/Sechin culture, Norte Chico (Caral), Honda, Lauricocha III, Viscachani; Peru, Chile: Chinchorro
Period IV	6000 BC – 4200 BC	Peru: Ambo, Canario, Siches, Lauricocha II, Luz, Toquepala II; Peru, Chile: Chinchorro
Period III	8000 BC – 6000 BC	Ecuador: Las Vegas, 8000–4600 BC; Peru: Arenal, Chivateros II, Lauricocha I, Playa Chira, Puyenca, Toquepala I; Peru, Chile: Chinchorro
Period II	9500 BC – 8000 BC	Ecuador: El Inga; Peru: Chivateros I, Lauricocha I
Period I	? BC – 9500 BC	Colombia: El Abra, (12,500–10,000 BC); Peru: Oquendo, Red Zone (central coast); Argentina & Chile: Patagonia

== See also ==
- Mississippi culture
- Indigenous peoples of the Americas – for coverage on present-day indigenous peoples
- Lithic stage in Canada
- Cultural periods of Peru
- Pre-Columbian Brazil
- Pre-Columbian Ecuador
- Pre-Columbian cultures of Colombia
- Classification of the Indigenous peoples of the Americas
- Marajoara culture
- Quilmes people
- Ancestral Puebloans

== Sources ==
- Pieroni, Agustín (2015). El virreino y los virreyes [The Viceroyalty and the Viceroys] (in Spanish). Buenos Aires. ISBN 978-987-02-8164-1. OCLC 936228861.
