= Capuli =

Capuli may refer to:

- The Pre-Columbian Capulí culture
- The Capulin cherry
