= Inza =

Inza may refer to:

- a drug with the active ingredient naproxen
- Inza, Russia, a town in Ulyanovsk Oblast, Russia
- Inza, Cauca, town in Colombia
- Inza Nelson, wife of Doctor Fate in DC Comics
