= Inzá, Cauca =

Coordinates: 2°33′N 76°04′W

- Municipality and town
- Flag

- Location of the municipality and town of Inza, Cauca in the Cauca Department of Colombia.
- Country: Colombia
- Department: Cauca Department

Population (Census 2018)
  - Total: 26,571
- Time zone: UTC-5 (Colombia Standard Time)
- Climate: Cfb

Inzá (Spanish pronunciation: [inˈsa]) is a town and municipality in the Cauca Department, Colombia. It was part of the San Agustín culture in the Pre-Columbian era, and home to the Tierradentro site. It is mostly inhabited by Paez people.
