= Cauca culture =

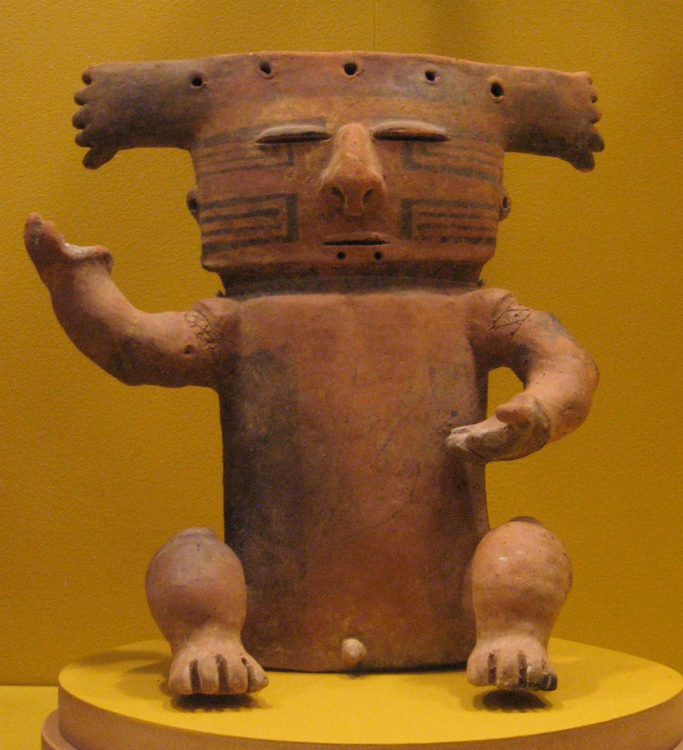
Middle Cauca culture male figure, Caldas complex, black on red resist painted ceramic, 10.75" high, LACMA

Cauca culture (800–1200 CE) is a pre-Columbian culture from the Valle del Cauca in Colombia, named for the Cauca River. Middle Cauca culture dates from the 9 to 10th centuries CE.

Their territory was near the present day city of Popayán, in the Calima River Valley.

== Society ==
Archaeologists surmise that Cauca culture was organized into several related chiefdoms that traded and fought with each other. They farmed and made ceramics and goldwork.

== Artwork ==
Their art often featured avian imagery. Cauca culture art shared some similarities to Yotoco culture art. They are known for ceramic slab figurines, representing humans–both female and male–with dramatically angular features.

== Goldwork ==
Cauca goldsmiths hammered and cast gold to create a range of figures and ornaments, including diadems and bracelets. They created caricuri noserings from gold.

== See also ==
- Calima culture
- Indigenous peoples in Colombia
- List of pre-Columbian cultures

== Bibliography ==
- Bruhns, Karen Olsen. Ancient South America. Cambridge, UK: Cambridge University Press, 1994. ISBN 978-0-521-27761-7.
