= Pre-Columbian cultures of Colombia =

Ancient cultures and civilizations of Columbia

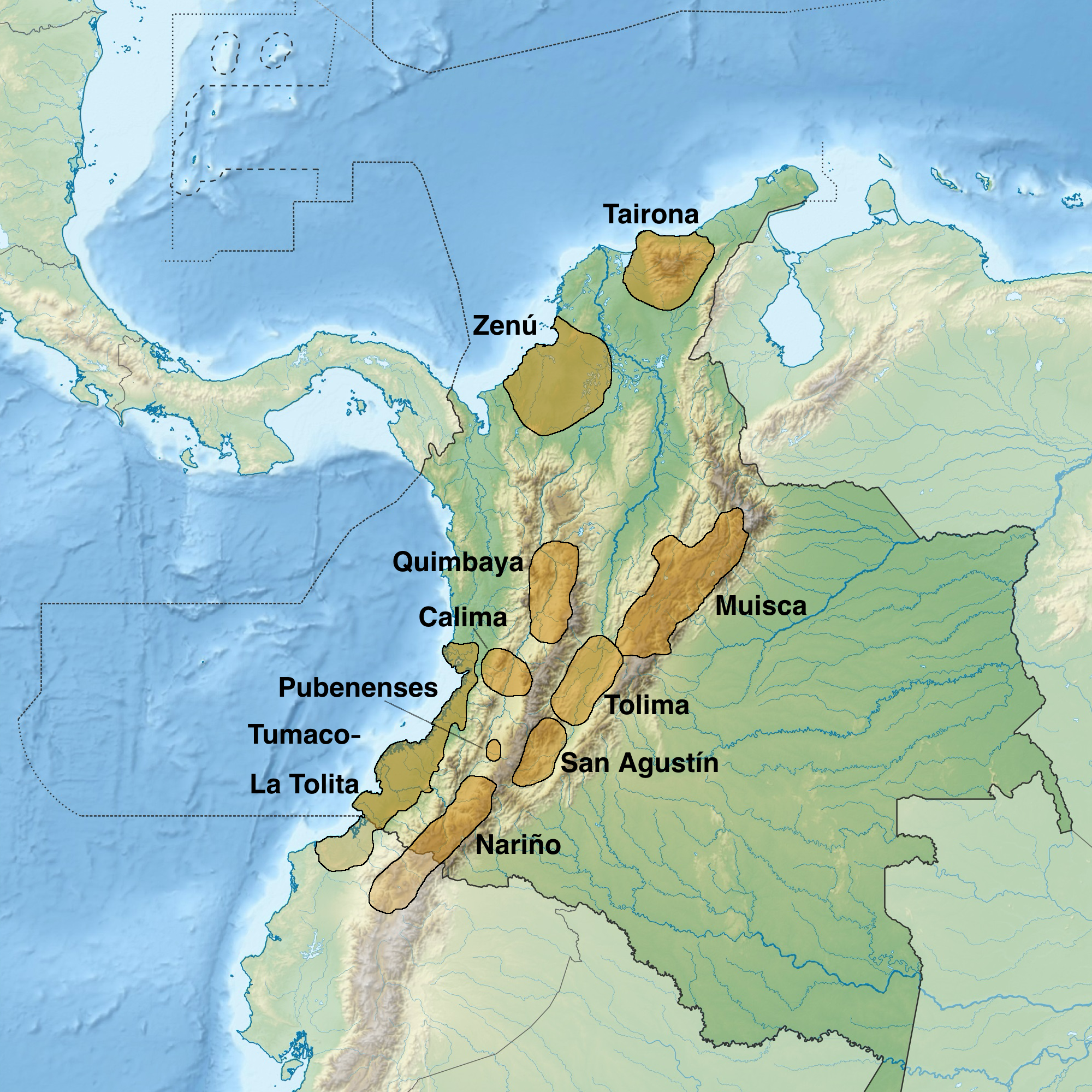
Location map of the pre-Columbian cultures of Colombia

The pre-Columbian cultures of Colombia refers to the ancient cultures and civilizations of Colombia.

== Population ==
The population of pre-Columbian cultures in the modern-day country of Colombia is estimated to have been around 6 million. Around a third of them, or about 2 million people were Muiscas located in Andean highlands, with the population being concentrated in a similar way to modern-day Colombia. Lower estimates number the pre-Columbian population at just around 3 million people whereas higher estimates place the population at 10-12 million people.

== Geography ==
Owing to its location, the present territory of Colombia was a corridor of early human migration from Mesoamerica and the Caribbean to the Andes and Amazon basin. The oldest archaeological finds are from the Pubenza and El Totumo sites in the Magdalena Valley 100 kilometres (62 mi) southwest of Bogotá. These sites date from the Paleoindian period (18,000–8000 BCE). At Puerto Hormiga and other sites, traces from the Archaic Period (~8000–2000 BCE) have been found. Vestiges indicate that there was also early occupation in the regions of El Abra and Tequendama in Cundinamarca. The oldest pottery discovered in the Americas, found at San Jacinto, dates to 5000–4000 BCE.

Indigenous people inhabited the territory that is now Colombia by 12,500 BCE. Nomadic hunter-gatherer tribes at the El Abra, Tibitó and Tequendama sites near present-day Bogotá traded with one another and with other cultures from the Magdalena River Valley. Between 5000 and 1000 BCE, hunter-gatherer tribes transitioned to agrarian societies; fixed settlements were established, and pottery appeared. Beginning in the 1st millennium BCE, groups of Amerindians including the Muisca, Zenú, Quimbaya, and Tairona developed the political system of cacicazgos with a pyramidal structure of power headed by caciques.

Most of the Amerindians practiced agriculture and the social structure of each indigenous community was different. Some groups of indigenous people such as the Caribs lived in a state of permanent war, but others had less bellicose attitudes.

There was no dominant culture in the pre-Columbian Colombia. Most of the aboriginal groups belonged to one of 3 major linguistic groups (Arawak, Carib, and Chibcha) and were part of a patchwork of several cultures and subcultures. These indigenous peoples developed the cultivation of yucca in the lower elevations, corn at middle altitudes, and potatoes in the highlands. They practiced ceramic pottery and other crafts, with important achievements in the working of gold, as the use of “tumbaga”, an alloy of gold and copper that facilitated the work of the artisan.

None of the native peoples developed a system of writing comparable to that of the Mayas, nor a native empire such as that of the Aztecs or Incas. By 1500, the most advanced of the indigenous peoples were the Taironas and the Muiscas.

== Main cultures ==
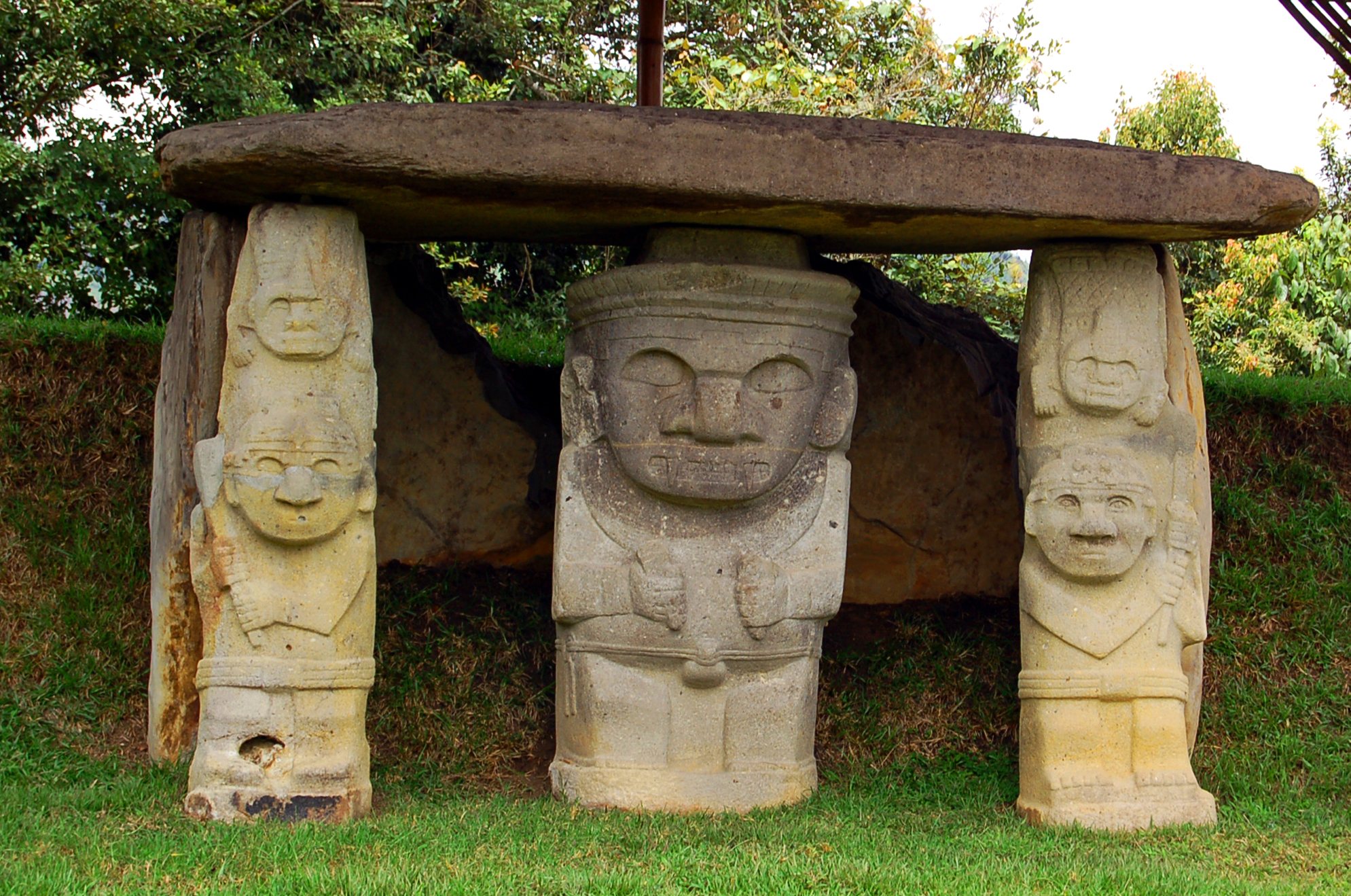
San Agustín Archaeological Park

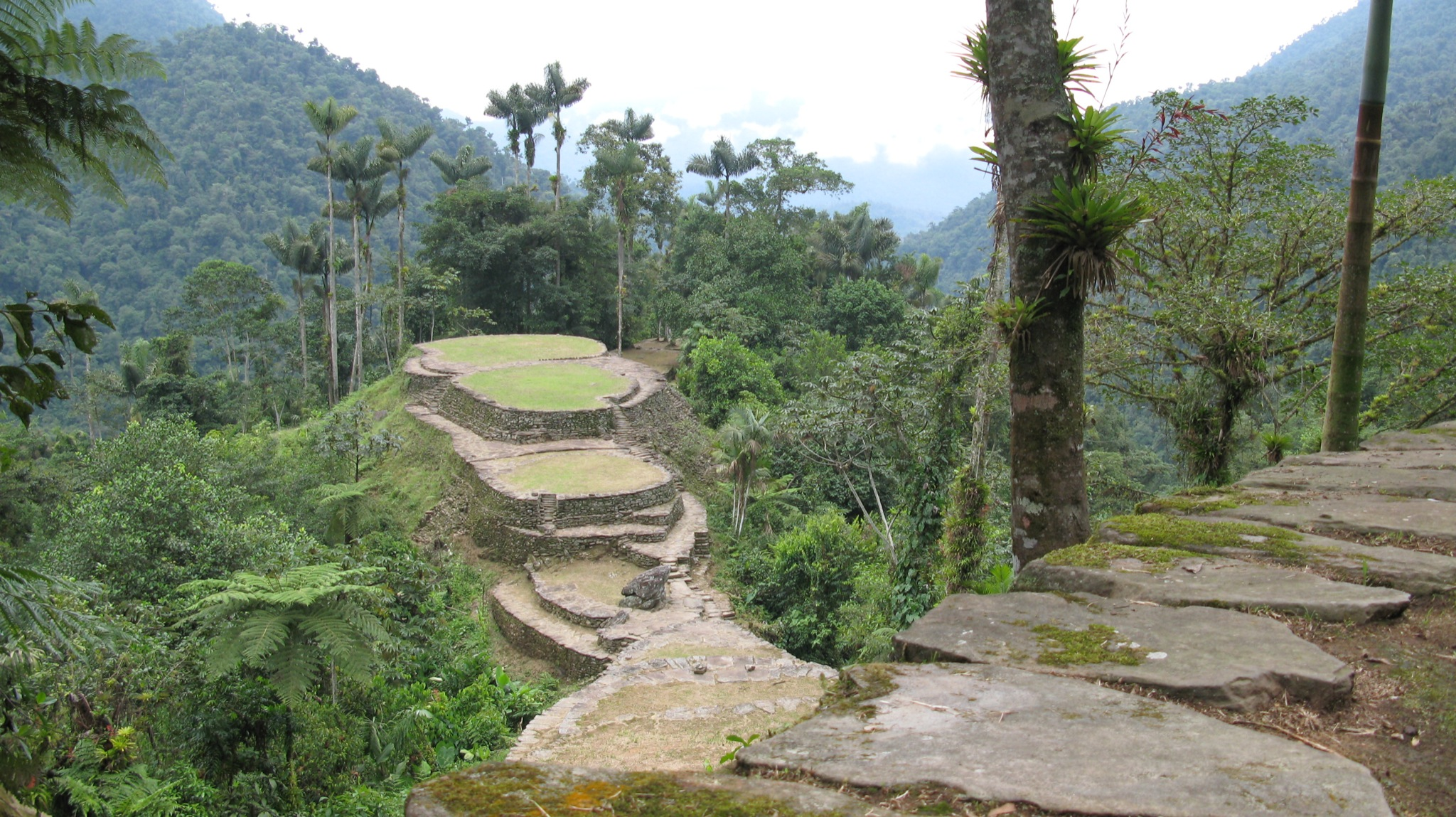
Ciudad Perdida ("The Lost City")

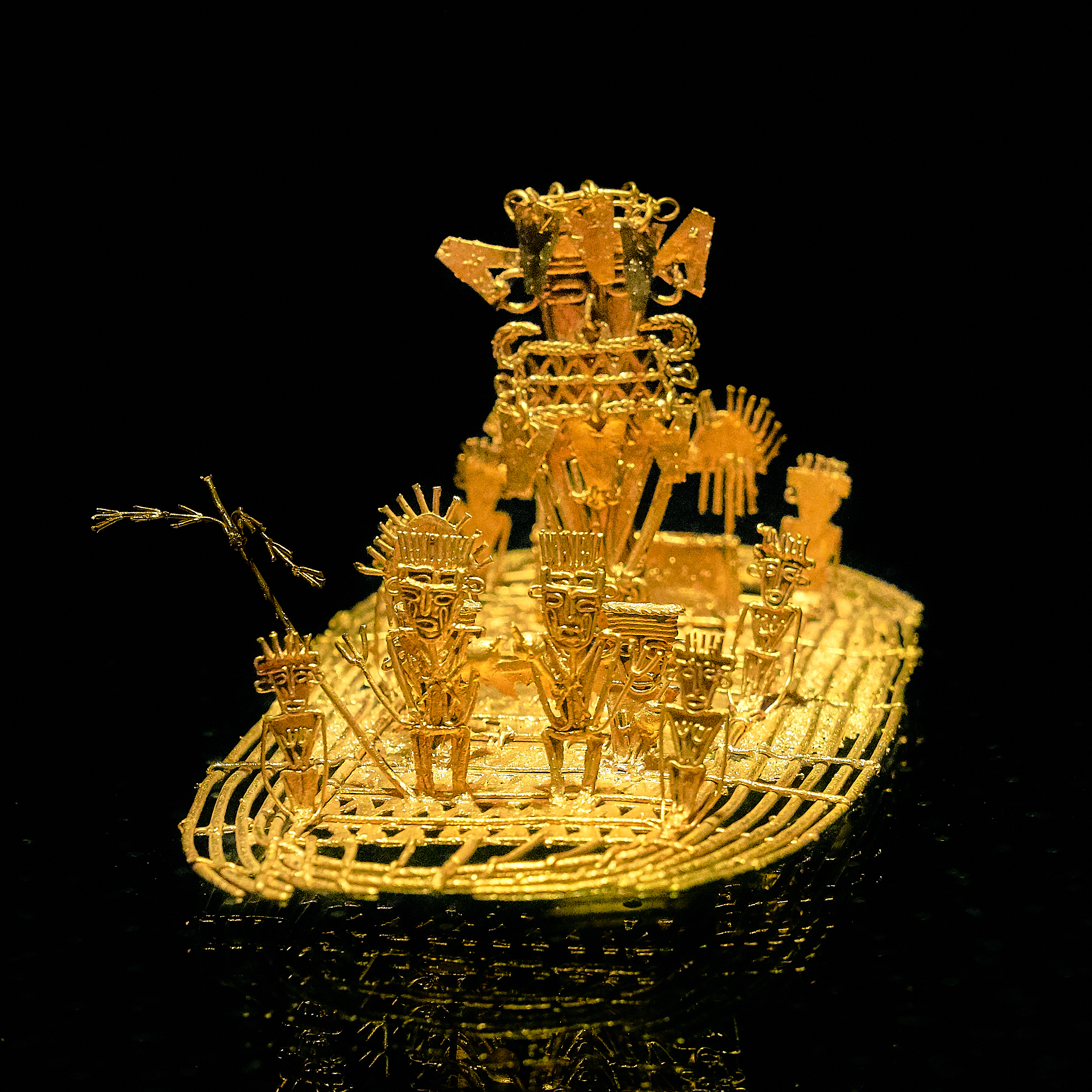
Muisca raft. The figure refers to the ceremony of the legend of El Dorado.

The San Agustín culture inhabited the upper Magdalena region in what is today the Huila Department, in central Colombia. This culture is recognized by its megalithic statues, which were created for religious use. The Tierradentro Archaeological Site was located within the boundaries of this culture.

The Tumaco culture was located in southwest Colombia (Department of Nariño), in the border with Ecuador. It was characterized by their pottery work, which was mainly sculptural.

The Tolima culture inhabited current-day Tolima Department in central Colombia. It's recognized by their goldsmith and pottery.

In southwestern Colombia (department of Nariño), the Capuli culture is recognized by their pottery, emphasizing the negative painting or positive bicolor.

In western Colombia (department of Valle del Cauca), the Calima culture took advantage of its location in one of the main natural ways of communication between the Pacific Coast and the valley of the Cauca River, which promoted the flourishing of a culture characterized by its goldsmith.

The Sinú or Zenú culture was located in northwest Colombia (departments of Sucre and Córdoba) and its recognized by their utilitarian and ritual ceramics and goldsmith in which they combined several techniques. They also did a system of drainage channels to control floodings.

The Quimbaya inhabited regions of the Cauca River Valley between the Western and Central Ranges of the Colombian Andes (current-day departments of Caldas, Risaralda and Quindío). This culture is recognized by their goldsmith, which, among other things, produced poporos (bottles for storing lime used in chewing of coca leaves) of gold.

The Tairona inhabited northern Colombia in the isolated mountain range of Sierra Nevada de Santa Marta (current Magdalena Department, northern Colombia). This culture is recognized by their goldsmith, their pottery and their stone constructions in the slopes of the mountains, like Ciudad Perdida ("The Lost City").

The Muisca inhabited mainly the area of what is now Bogotá and the departments of Boyacá and Cundinamarca in central Colombia, where they formed the Muisca Confederation. They farmed corn, potato, quinoa and cotton, and traded gold, emeralds, blankets, ceramic handicrafts, coca and especially rock salt with neighboring nations. Among Muisca goldsmith, is remarkable the fabrication of Tunjos, anthropomorphic figurines used for ritual purposes.

== See also ==
- Herrera Period
- Gold Museum, Bogotá
- Quimbaya Civilization
