= Tierradentro =

National Archeological Park of Tierra abajo
UNESCO World Heritage Site
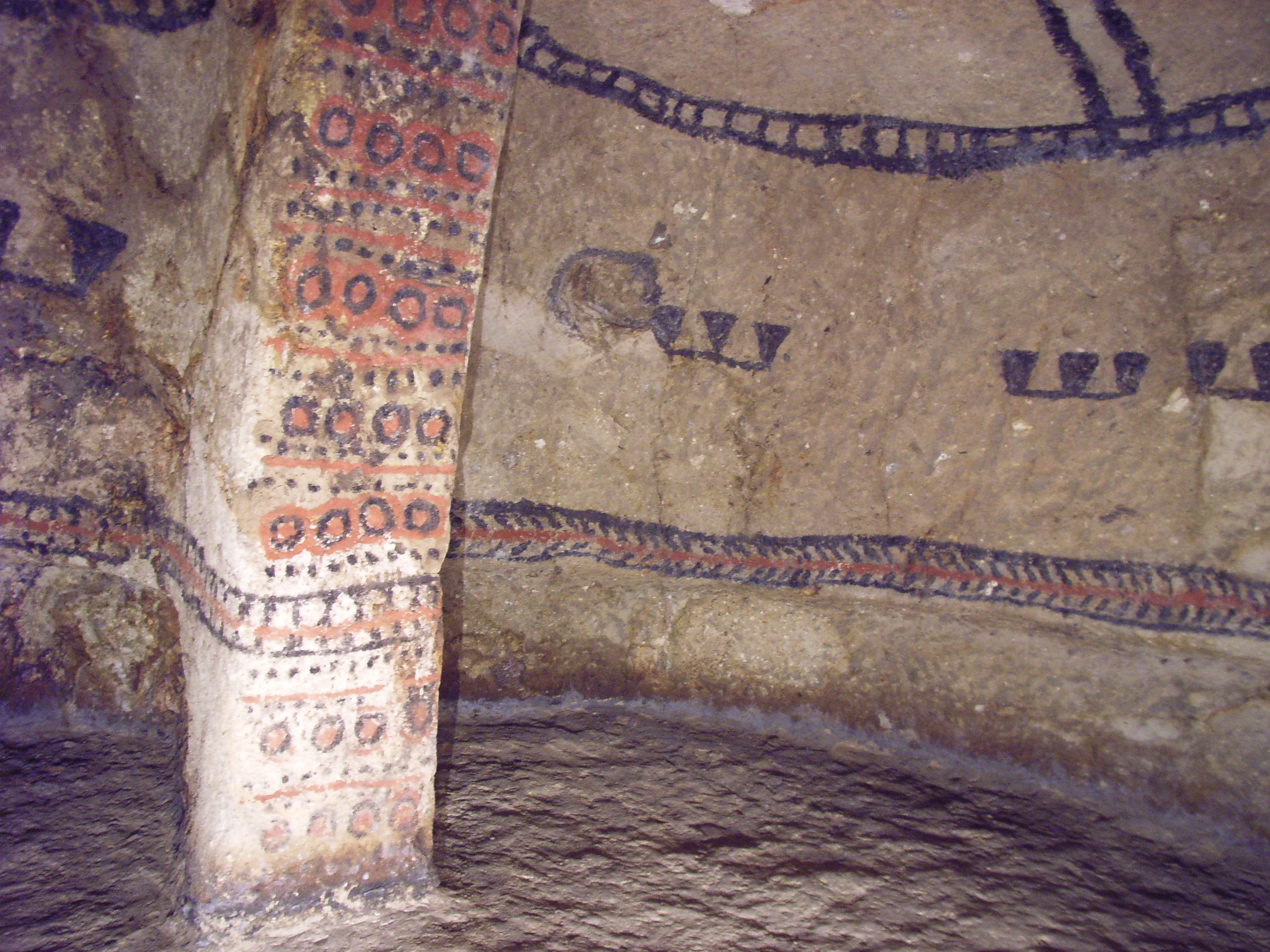

- Location within Colombia
- Location: Inza, Colombia
- Criteria: Cultural: (iii)
- Reference: 743
- Inscription: 1995 (19th Session)
- Coordinates: 2°35′N 76°2′W

Tierradentro (meaning "Underground" in Spanish for their well-known tombs) is one of the ancient Pre-Columbian cultures of Colombia. It started to flourish around 200 BC in the mountains of southwest Colombia, and continued into the 17th century. The Tierradentro culture is particularly well known for its dense collection of elaborate pre-Columbian hypogea. It is considered part of San Agustín culture rather than a separate culture.

The typical Tierradentro hypogeum has an entry oriented towards the west, a spiral staircase and a main chamber, usually 5 to 8 meters below the surface, with several lesser chambers around, each one containing a corpse. The walls are painted with geometric, anthropomorphic and zoomorphic patterns in red, black and white. Some statues and remains of pottery and fabrics can be seen scarcely due to grave robbery before the hypogea were constituted as protected areas. The details in the sculptures and pictorial patterns in the hypogea are similar to the neighboring San Agustín culture, although they occur at much higher density.

Hypogea have been found in several excavations across the region, including Alto del Aguacate (Avocado Hill), Alto de San Andrés, Alto de Segovia, Alto del Duende and El Tablón. The mountainous area where the Tierradentro culture thrived and the excavations of 162 hypogea now comprise a national archeological park in the jurisdiction of the municipality of Inza, Department of Cauca, Colombia. The park is located 100 km away from the capital of the Department, Popayán. The Tierradentro culture that created this funeral complex inhabited this area during the first millennium AD, and the park features hypogea dating from 6th to 9th centuries AD. The Terradentro National Archeological Park was listed as a UNESCO World Heritage Site in 1995 because of its "unique testimony to the artistic and social culture of the region".

The park generates significant revenue to the local economy due to the high volume of tourists, both Colombian and foreigners. These sites form a UNESCO World Heritage Site. The site was listed on the World Monuments Fund's 2012 World Monuments Watch list of 100 Most Endangered Sites.
