= San Agustín culture =

Archaeological culture in pre-Columbia

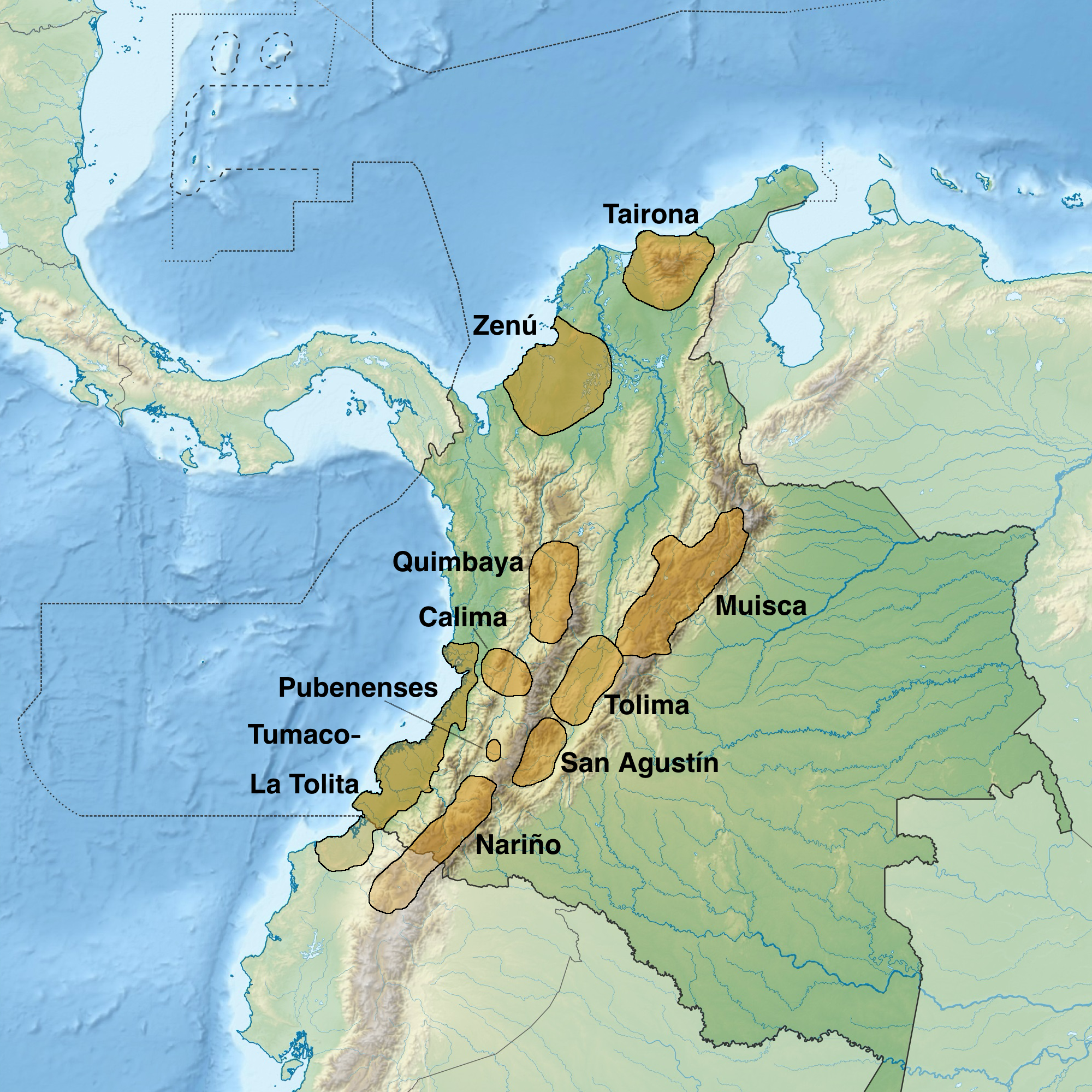
Location of San Agustín culture among the other ancient cultures of Colombia

The San Agustín culture is one of the ancient Pre-Columbian cultures of Colombia. Its beginnings go back at least to the fourth millennium B.C. Several hundred large monolithic sculptures have been found here.

There is an ongoing scientific study into the culture's origins and nature. For its period, the San Agustín culture displays considerable development in agriculture, ceramics, goldsmithing, and sculptural art. The site of the culture lies mostly within the Parque Arqueológico Nacional de Tierradentro and the San Agustín Archaeological Park.

== Description ==
The origins of San Agustín culture go back to the thirty-third century BCE. A radiocarbon date of 3300±120 B.C. has been obtained for the Lavapatas site.

The chronology of the culture is divided into the following periods: the Archaic, the Formative, the Regional Classic Period (1-900 A.D.), and the Recent Period.

Similarly to the other parts of the Colombian Southwest, during the Archaic period, the inhabitants of the area already used various crops of wild origin. These were small groups of 15-25 people that frequently moved their camps. For their tools, they used stone and organic raw materials such as bone and shells. The polished stone axes with handle are similar to those of the Calima Valley. Small arrowheads and mortars are also similar to those of Popayán and Valle del Cauca.

The beginning of the Formative Period was during 1000-600 BC. At that time, there was widespread sedentary occupation near the fertile agricultural lands. Ceramics were already being produced. Corn, beans, quinua, manioc and yam were being planted. The dead were buried in shaft tombs located near their houses.

During the Regional Classic Period (1-900 AD), great earth mounds were built. They covered funerary dolmens that used large slabs. These were marked by stone statues of mythological beings. Nevertheless, these tombs had rather few offerings.

The ceramics were relatively crude and poorly decorated. Yet a very elaborate and technologically complex goldwork was being produced.

The Recent Period was during 900-1350 A.D. The population increased yet further. The systems of drainage channels and earthworks indicate that agriculture was actually intensified at this time.

The greatest flowering of San Agustín culture seems to have taken place from the 8th to the 1st century BC.

The ancient inhabitants who built the stone monuments abandoned the area by the 14th and 15th centuries AD. The reasons for this are unclear.

The neighbouring Tierradentro culture is related to San Agustín culture.

== Discovery ==
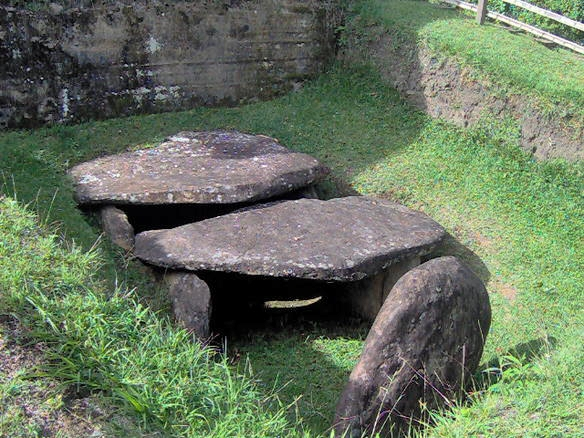
Tombs

The first information about the archaeological ruins of San Agustín appears in the work Wonders of Nature by the Mallorcan missionary Fray Juan de Santa Gertrudis, of the Observant Order, who visited the place several times in 1756. His travel chronicle, began in Cartagena de Indias and finished in Lima, remained unpublished in Palma de Mallorca until 1956, when a copy of the manuscript was sent to Colombia and published the same year.

== Geography ==
The culture is situated in a mountainous region in southern Colombia at the base of the Colombian Massif. The region consists of undulating hills and inclined planes that descend into narrow and deep canyons. In the area of San Agustín, the rugged landscape creates a succession of climates.

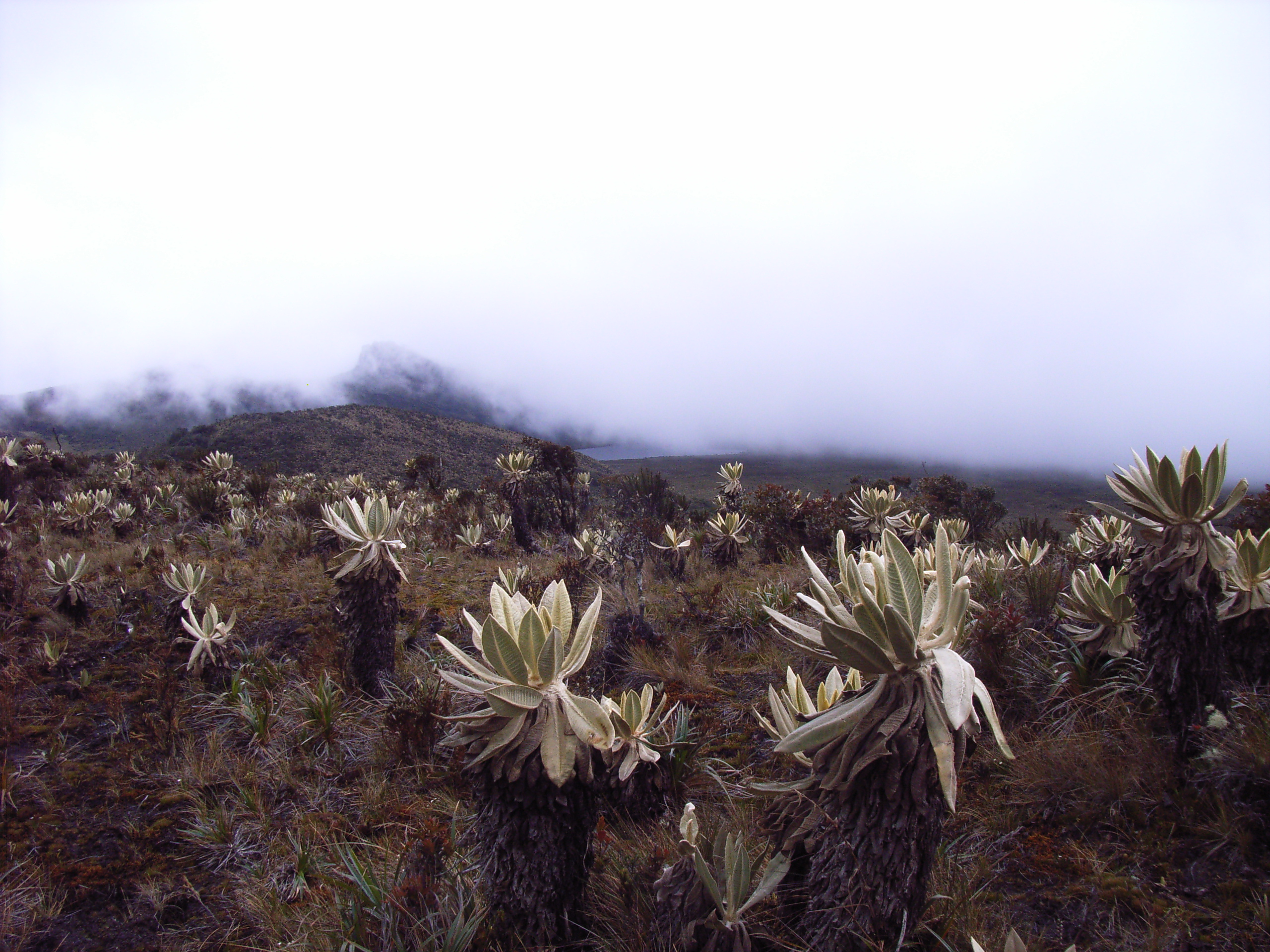
Páramo de las Papas in the Colombian Massif

The area where the Pre-Columbian relics are located corresponds to the current municipalities of San Agustín, Isnos and Saladoblanco at Huila Department.

== Archaeology ==
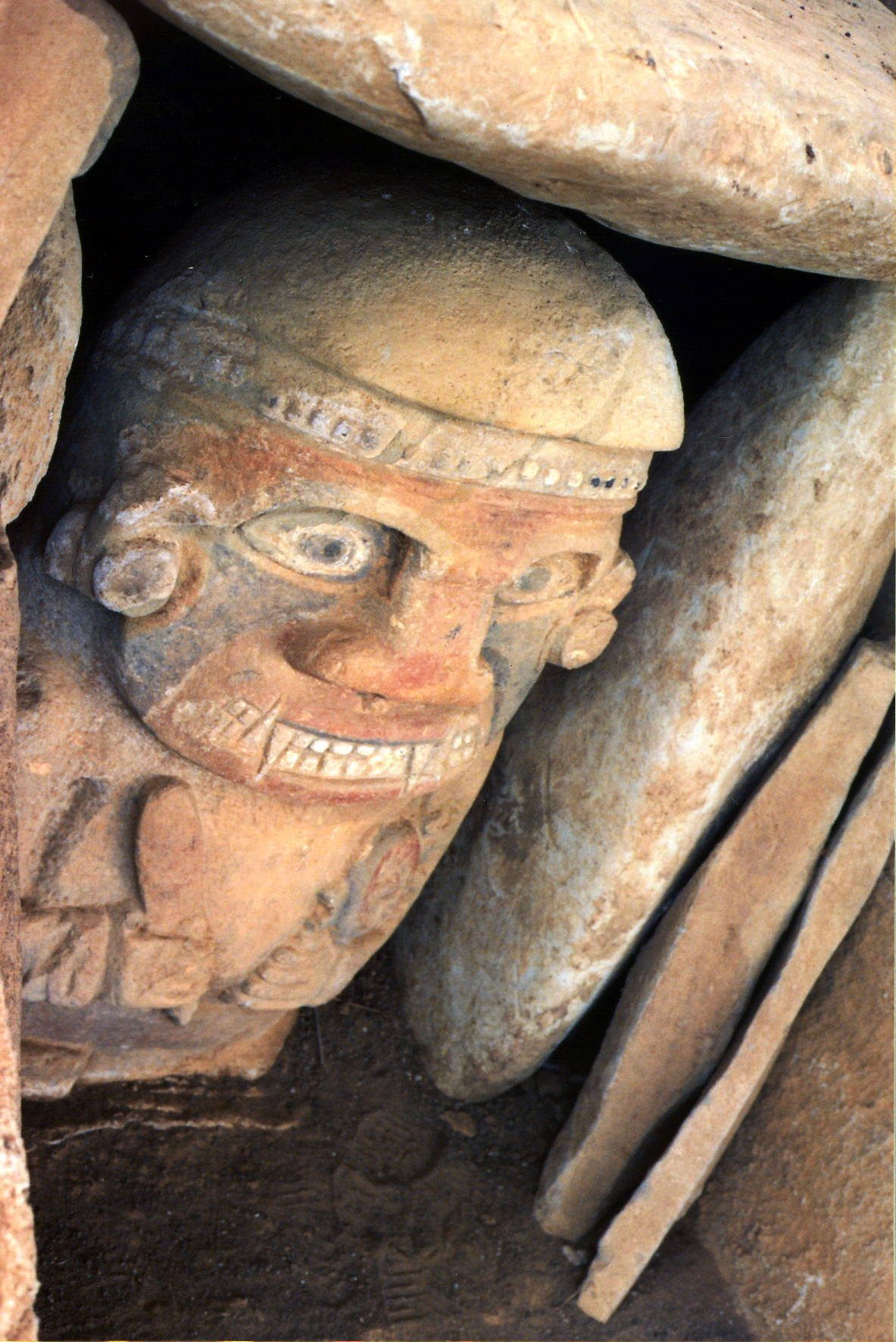
Tomb with coloration

Statues and tombs appear as ceremonial centers, isolated from each other. Historical tradition has bestowed these places with names such as Mesitas, Lavapatas, Ullumbe, Alto de los Ídolos, Alto de las Piedras, Quinchana, El Tablón, La Chaquira, La Parada, Quebradillas and Lavaderos.

Some of the tombs are lined with large slabs with monolithic sarcophagi inside and are covered with artificial mounds that reach up to 30 metres (98 ft) in diameter and 5 metres (16 ft) in height. Others contain statues over 4 metres (13 ft) in height and several tons in weight.

The most outstanding lithic work is called "Fuente de Lavapatas", in the rocky bed of the ravine of the same name, where there is an elaborate ceremonial fountain with three pools and numerous serpentine and batracomorphic figures in low relief, surrounded by tiny channels through which water flows. It has been suggested that the site was dedicated to the worship of aquatic deities and to the practice of healing ceremonies.

=== Alto de los Ídolos ===
Located in the Municipality of Isnos, Alto de los Ídolos is the site with a great density of tombs, mounds and statues. It was reported for the first time by Konrad Preuss in 1931. It is located 4 km southwest of the modern town of Isnos.

Settlements similar to those of the Agustin culture have been found deep in the Amazon jungle in the Caqueta state, 100 miles southwest San Agustin.

Much of this area is still unexplored, particularly the areas that ascend towards el Valle de Las Papas, which is covered by dense jungle that has only recently been explored by archaeologists.

== Settlements ==
Archaeological research has reconstructed much of the settlement in upper Magdalena. It is believed that it relied on farming corn, peanuts, chontaduro (Guilielma gasipaes), and cassava, in addition to fishing and hunting activities. Evidence of such activities has been verified in strata dating from the seventh century BCE.

Their complex sculptural art, relating to cosmogonic and religious conceptions, contrasts markedly with the simple structure of their dwellings; these were circular in plan and covered with straw. The houses were built with decomposable materials, so little evidence of them has survived, except postholes from logs pushed into the ground. These logs formed walls and supported roofs, forming enclosures up to 9 metres (30 ft) in diameter.

A settlement was usually made up of several huts in close proximity. They contained stoves, which were made out of semi-rounded stones. There are traces of small workshops and waste dumps within or close to the houses.

The orography of the region, characterized by gentle undulations of volcanic origin, delimited by the course of numerous streams and streams, determined a pattern of dispersed settlements, similar to that which persists in rural areas of Colombia today.

== Social organization ==
At its height, the culture was characterized by the development of lithic statuary; the construction of large embankments or terraces for the location of the necropolis; the construction of retaining walls; tombs covered with large stone slabs or artificial mounds crowned with funerary shrines; and ceremonial fountains carved into native rock.

These are considered to indicate an advanced social and political stratification. The sculpture, in particular, indicates a specialization of work, given the degree of complexity achieved by its sculptors. In addition, differences in the structure of the tombs of the same site, without clear indications of a cultural sequence, suggest social stratification, since ceramics and other funerary items testify to their contemporaneity. Such stratification could be based on the difference between occupational groups and the political and religious hierarchy, consolidated in the formation of small lordships, a typical organization of most of the indigenous groups found by the Spaniards in the 16th century in the Andean region.

It is possible that the dispersion of lithic statuary in the San Agustín culture is explained by the existence of an organization structured on the basis of small family groups, linked together by religious ties. This could explain the variety of motifs and styles represented in the statues within an apparent morphological homogeneity. Shamanism or mohánismo could also play a role.

The archeological evidence suggests that in this flourishing period of Augustinian culture, social organization was strongly influenced by warrior groups, and religious forms by solar deities and war. The statues of Mesitas A and B of the Archaeological Park seem to be the most authentic representation of this period. They appear guarding the entrance of tombs covered with large slabs, with monolithic sarcophagi inside.

== Sculpture ==
More than three hundred statues have been found, most of them in an area delimited by the basins of the Magdalena, Bordones, Mazamorras and Sombrerillos rivers and the peaks of the Colombian Massif. The blocks in which they were carved are volcanic tuffs and lava andesites, some of large dimensions, up to more than four meters high and several tons in weight. With the exception of the neighboring region of Tierradentro (Cauca) such monumental sculpture is found in no other area of Colombia.

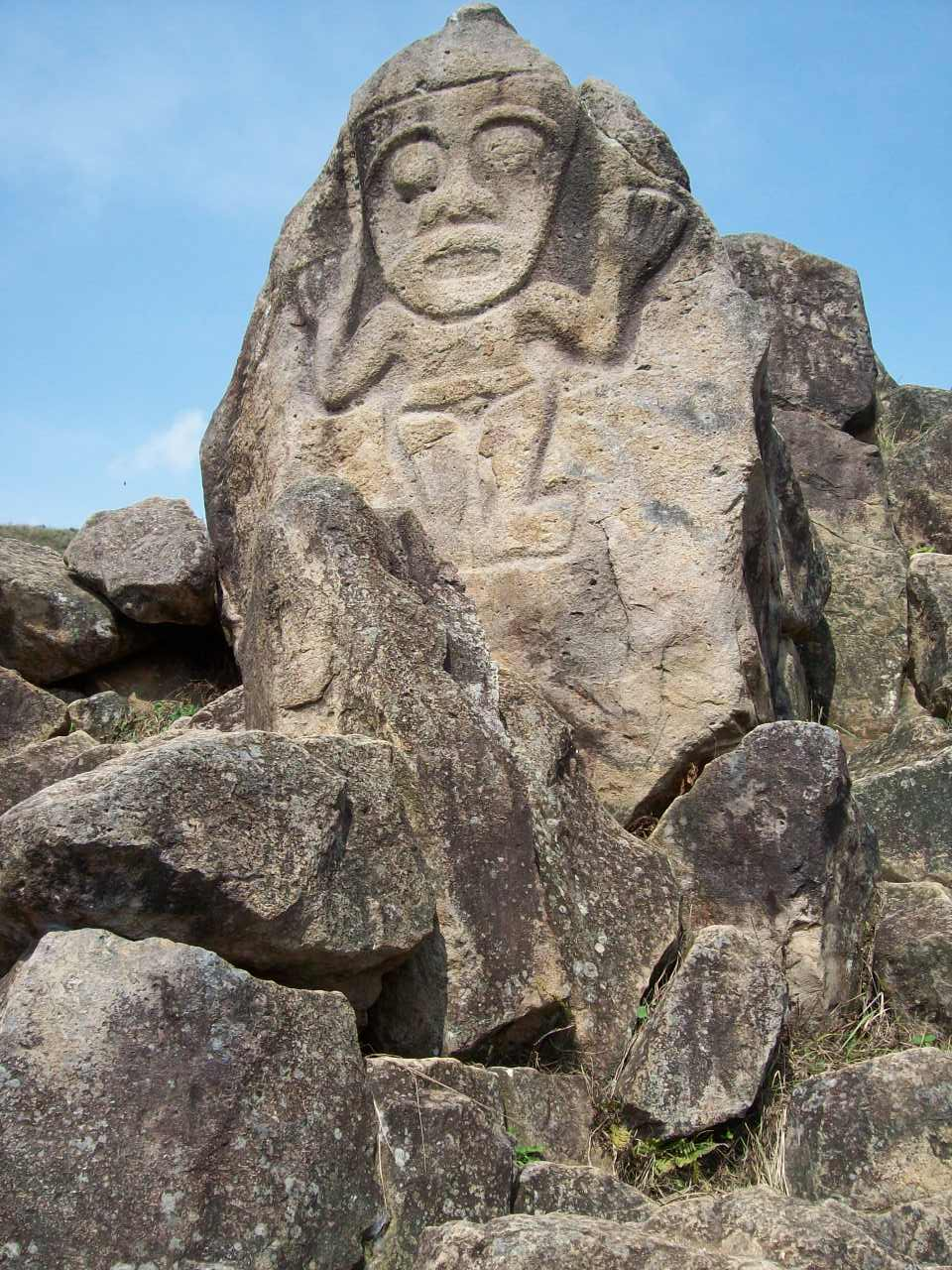
"Goddess of the Chaquira" in a ravine of the Magdalena River

The general structure of the archaeological complex of San Agustín evidences some characteristic features, such as the homogeneity of certain elements and their continuity through the different periods, which speaks in favor of a cultural kinship of the different groups that lived there and of a long tradition of them. This is also suggested by elements such as ceramics and lithics, as well as in certain motifs represented in the sculptures, whose ancestral forms began at least in the 7th century BCE and persist, next to later ones, until the 16th century CE.

In the sculptures appear several animals linked to natural or productive phenomena. The sun, moon, lightning, rain and other natural phenomena are personified and expressed in the carvings. The deities appear anthropo-zoomorphized and closely associated with mortuary rites. The sun and the moon preside over the religious pantheon.

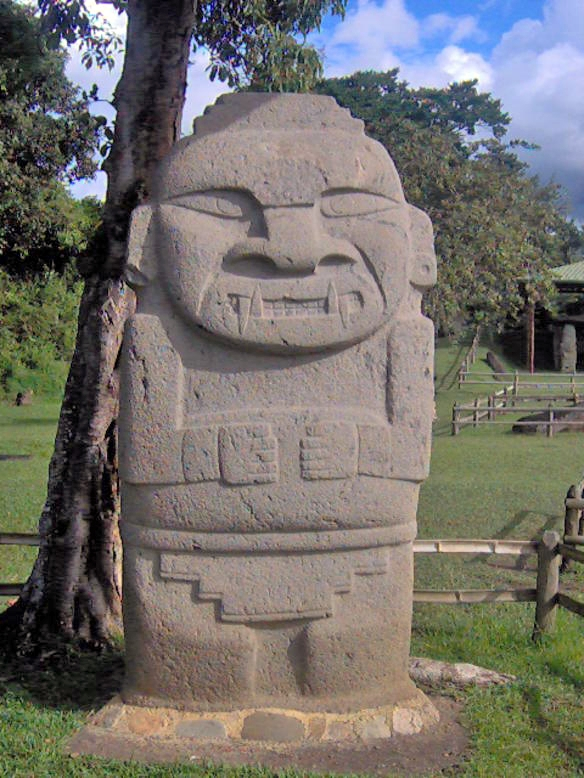
Statue in Las Mesitas

The frequency of representation of the feline mouth in most of the sculptures is indicative of the cult of the jaguar, which seems to be one of the oldest and most widespread among the peoples that lived in the Andean area and that still persists in the aboriginal populations of the Amazon jungle. In other Andean archaeological cultures this element also characterizes many sculptural representations.

== Las Mesitas area ==
The cultural activity of this whole region was clearly concentrated around the Mesitas area. There were also many residential sites here. The most ancient radiocarbon dates were also concentrated near Mesitas.

Many of the big sculptures are also found here. Some of them are referred to as caryatids, because they are representations of warriors and support the ceilings of the great tombs in Mesitas A and B.

Similar monoliths are found in the northwest mound of Mesita B and in the eastern and western mounds of Mesita A. These statues represent warriors, in a naturalistic way, adorned with special tiaras and carrying weapons: rounded throwing stones and shields. In other statues the shield is replaced by a short club, the macuahuitl referred to in the chronicles of the 16th century.

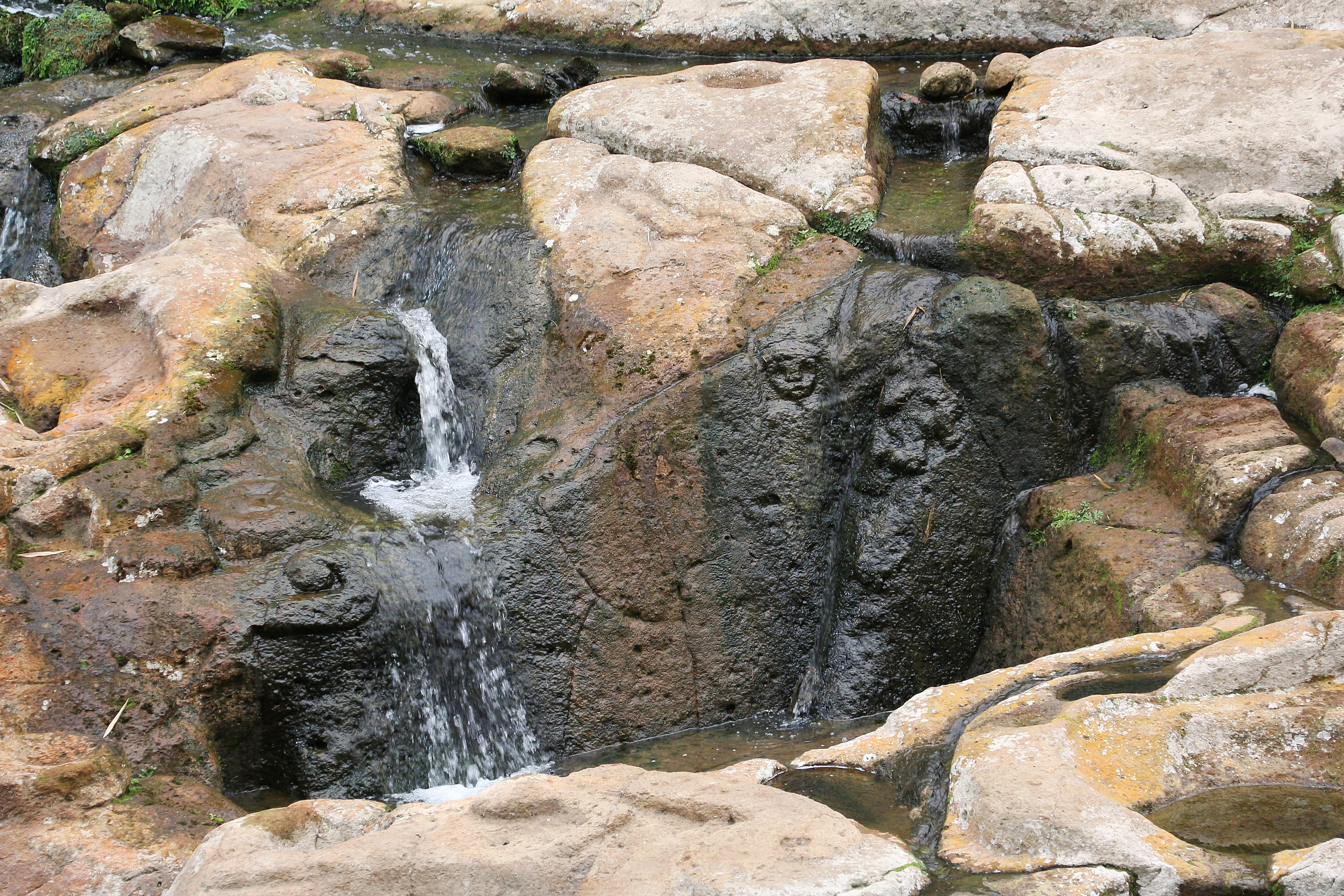
Fuente de Lavapatas

At the location here called La Estación, a temple or ceremonial house has been identified, belonging to the Recent Period. It's the largest architectural structure found in the region, and is 9 m in diameter.

== Clothing and ornaments ==
Many of the anthropomorphic figures appear naked or with only with light clothing and ornaments, such as necklaces, bracelets, nose rings and earmuffs. This is curious, since the area of San Agustín is a region with a moderately temperate climate and this cools considerably as it ascends to the Valley of the Popes. However, several sculptures incorporate kilts and bark hats. Implements for spinning, such as spindle flywheels, are rare in the archeological record of the excavations so far carried out. Ornaments recovered are varied: necklaces of limestone and hard stone beads, these last of bluish green color, tubular, with longitudinal orifices; shell, seed, bone and gold beads; gold nosepieces, circular, laminated or in twisted wires, with horn or stone bead settings; solid gold earrings, featuring tiny eagles; gold headbands, earmuffs and other ornaments. They coincide with those observed on the statues.

== Ceramics ==
The culture's ceramics are fundamentally monochromatic, made in an oxidizing atmosphere, by the winding system and with engobes of different ocher tones. Most of the items are small bowls, plates, tripod pots or high support cups. There are also large vessels, used for the storage of liquids or as funeral urns. The decoration is almost always incised, although negative painting also occurs, black on red, from the early phases of the culture, known as the Superior Formative. In the final period, or Recent, bicolor positive painting appears, as well as a grainy decoration.

== See also ==
- Quimbayas
- Cultura calima
- Cultura Nariño
- Cultura Tumaco-La Tolita

== Bibliography ==
- San Agustin Archaeological Park Official website
- San Agustín Archaeological Park UNESCO World Heritage Centre
- Duque Gómez, Luis. San Agustín. Delroisse, 1982.
- Fajardo, Julio José. San Agustín: una cultura alucinada. Barcelona, España, Plaza & Janés, 1977.
- Ramírez Sendoya, Pedro José. Jijon La cultura megalítica de San Agustín. 1958
- Culture of San Agustín at todacolombia.com (in Spanish)
- Information about San Agustín at colombia.com (in Spanish)
