= Capulí culture =

Archaeological classification

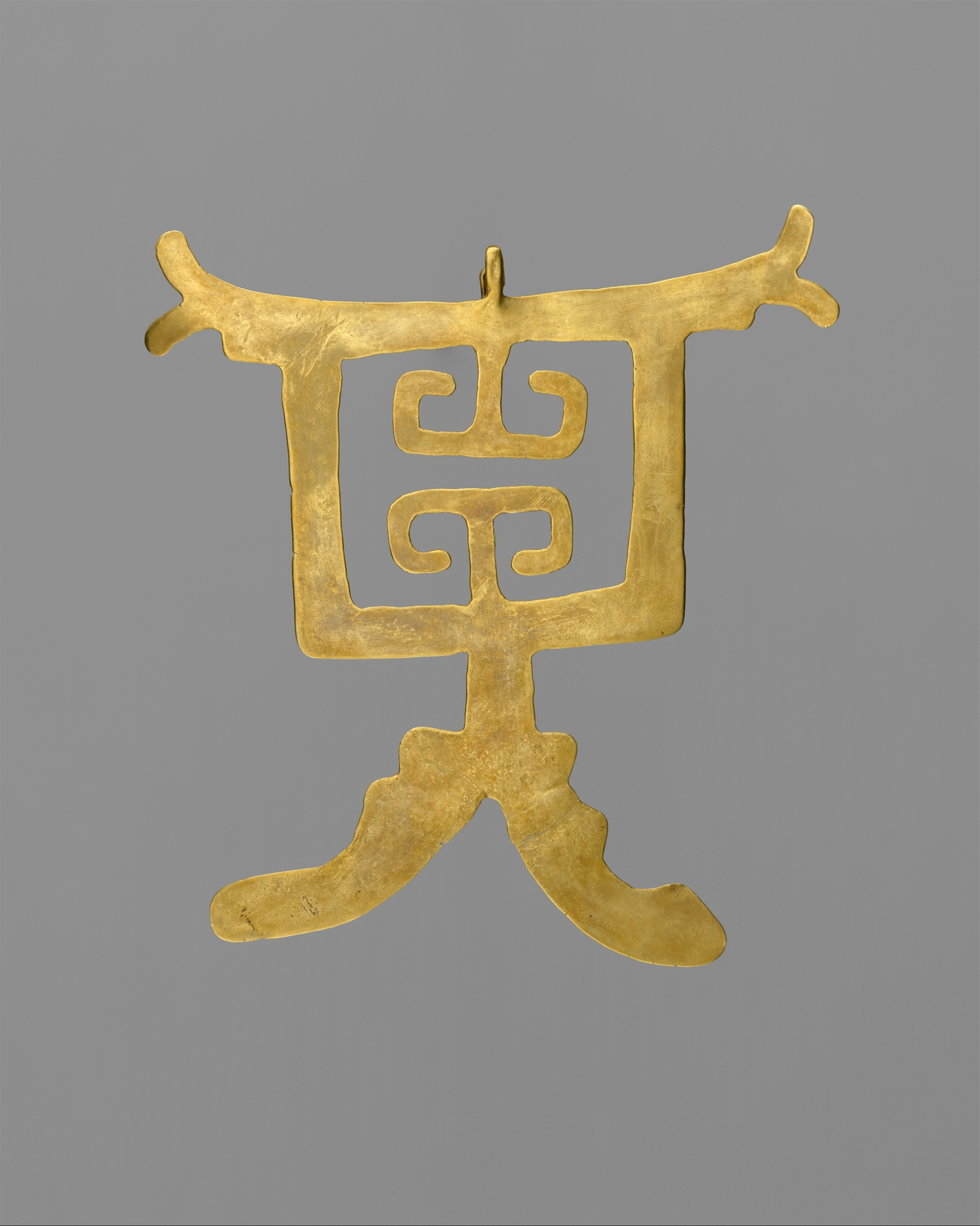
Capulí gold pendant, from a deep shaft tomb. 4th–10th century AD

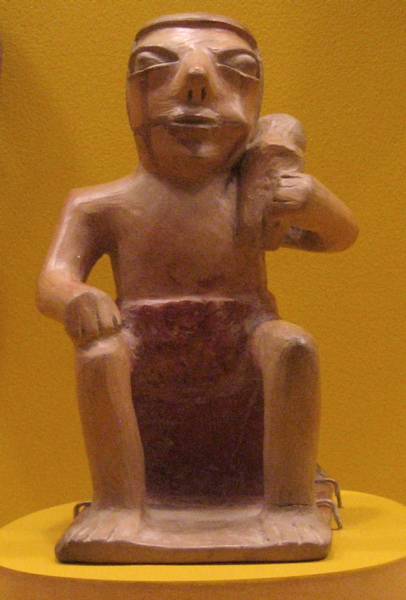
Coquero

The Capulí culture (or Nariño culture) refers to an archaeological classification for a group in Pre-Columbian South America on the Andean plain in what is now northern Ecuador (Carchi Province) and southern Colombia (Nariño Department). The Capulí preceded the Piartal and Tuza cultures in the archaeological record ranging from around 800 to 1500 CE. The Capulí culture left a strong record through its pottery. The Capulí had distinctive black on dark red pottery with rectilinear geometric designs. The anthropomorphic pottery statues of the Capulí can be striking. Women are depicted with a wrap that extends from the armpit to the ankle while men have loincloths and are often shown with an object such as a drum or animal. These figures are often called coqueros because they are depicted with wads of coca leaves in their mouths. Scholars have associated the figures with shamans and possible funerary rituals.

Capulí goldwork is similar to that of later Ecuadoran and Columbian cultures. Smiths hammered and soldered high-carat gold into geometric and zoomorphic designs. The most abstract Precolumbian works in gold come from the Capulí era in the Colombian/Ecuadorian highlands.

Capulí graves contained a mix of grave goods including conch shells and stone axes.

They harvested quinoa and raised llamas for agriculture and trade.

Their artwork was made out of materials such as wood, strings, and wool. Their work sometimes took the form of shaft burials. Their pottery reached important artistic development, being recognizable by its forms and decoration, emphasizing the negative painting or positive bicolor. Their jewelry work stands out for the large gold pectorals, nose rings, discs and plaques, all made with fine gold sheets and with complex geometric designs.

== Graves ==
Some graves in Nariño are extremely deep, as much as 40 m. Those in Carchi only exceeded 10 m in the early Capulí period and were later only 2 m deep. Graves were ellipsoid in shape, wider than deep, and burial chambers seem to have been kept open while tunnels were backfilled.

== See also ==
- List of pre-Columbian cultures
- Pre-Columbian cultures of Colombia
- Pre-Columbian cultures of Ecuador
